= Methanol fuel =

Alternative biofuel for engines

Methanol fuel is an alternative biofuel for internal combustion and other engines, either in combination with gasoline or independently. Methanol (CH_{3}OH) is less expensive to sustainably produce than ethanol fuel, although it is more toxic than ethanol and has a lower energy density than gasoline. Methanol is safer for the environment than gasoline, is an anti-freeze agent, prevents dirt and grime buildup within the engine, has a higher ignition temperature and can withstand compression equivalent to that of super high-octane gasoline. It can readily be used in most modern engines. To prevent vapor lock due to being a simple, pure fuel, a small percentage of other fuel or certain additives can be included. Methanol may be made from fossil fuels or renewable resources, in particular natural gas and coal, or biomass respectively. In the case of the latter, it can be synthesized from CO_{2} (carbon dioxide) and hydrogen. The vast majority of methanol produced globally is currently made with gas and coal. However, projects, investments, and the production of green-methanol has risen steadily into 2023. Methanol fuel is currently used by racing cars in many countries and has seen increasing adoption by the maritime industry.

In 2022, the worldwide biomethanol market was around 120 million USD. Most of it is currently made from biomass. Companies investing significantly in biomethanol production and research include Enerkem, Södra, Methanex, Alberta Pacific, and BASF.

== History and production ==
During the 1973 oil crisis, methanol produced from coal was suggested as a fuel to replace gasoline. In 2005, George A. Olah proposed a "methanol economy" based on energy storage in synthetically produced methanol.

In most countries, methanol is currently usually produced from syngas, obtained from steam reforming of methane (the chief constituent of natural gas). In China, which produced around 60% of the world's methanol in 2014, it is made primarily from coal. However, to be viable as an environmentally friendly fuel, it will need to be produced from renewable feedstocks, the most significant of which is biomass. Methanol produced from biomass is sometimes called biomethanol. Biomethanol is primarily produced by gasification of biomass. Like traditional methanol production, this produces syngas. After removing hydrogen sulfide and carbon dioxide (sweetening), which form as side products during the gasification step, methanol can be made using conventional methods. This route can offer renewable methanol production from biomass at efficiencies up to 75%.

Production methods using carbon dioxide as a feedstock have also been proposed. This method involves reacting the carbon dioxide with hydrogen gas at high temperatures and pressures in the presence of a copper-based catalyst. The main drawback of this approach is the difficulty of isolating carbon dioxide and hydrogen gas in the required large volumes and high purity. A small amount of methanol is produced annually using carbon dioxide captured from industrial flue gas. A theoretical model suggests that water and carbon dioxide sourced from direct air capture could make methanol production economically viable in arid regions, but this system has not been physically proven.

== Uses ==
=== Internal combustion engine fuel ===
Because of methanol's high octane rating of 114, it can achieve a higher thermal efficiency and power output compared to gasoline in engines developed for methanol use. However, it is also less volatile and burns at a lower temperature than gasoline, making it more difficult to start and warm up an engine in cold weather. In addition, its relatively low specific energy of around 17 MJ/kg (compared to 34 MJ/kg for gasoline) and air-to-fuel ratio of 6.4:1 mean that it suffers from higher fuel consumption than hydrocarbon fuels. Because it produces more water vapor when burned (similar to hydrogen combustion engines) and some acidic byproducts, increased wearing of engine components is likely. It may contain soluble contaminants like chloride ions, which makes it more corrosive. Insoluble contaminants, such as aluminum hydroxide, itself a product of corrosion by halide ions, clog the fuel system over time. Methanol is also hygroscopic, meaning it absorbs water vapor from the atmosphere. Because absorbed water dilutes the fuel value of the methanol (although it suppresses engine knock), and may cause phase separation of methanol-gasoline blends, containers of methanol fuels must be kept tightly sealed.

Compared to gasoline, methanol is more tolerant to exhaust gas recirculation (EGR), which improves fuel efficiency of the internal combustion engines utilizing Otto cycle and spark ignition.

An acid, albeit weak, methanol attacks the oxide coating that normally protects the aluminium from corrosion:

6 CH_{3}OH + Al_{2}O_{3} → 2 Al(OCH_{3})_{3} + 3 H_{2}O

The resulting methoxide salts are soluble in methanol, resulting in a clean aluminium surface, which is readily oxidized by dissolved oxygen. Also, the methanol can act as an oxidizer:

6 CH_{3}OH + 2 Al → 2 Al(OCH_{3})_{3} + 3 H_{2}

This reciprocal process effectively fuels corrosion until either the metal is eaten away or the concentration of CH_{3}OH is negligible. Methanol's corrosivity has been addressed with methanol-compatible materials and fuel additives that serve as corrosion inhibitors.

Organic methanol, produced from wood or other organic materials (bioalcohol), has been suggested as a renewable alternative to petroleum-based hydrocarbons. Low levels of methanol can be used in existing vehicles with the addition of cosolvents and corrosion inhibitors.

=== Racing ===
High-octane fuel blends based on methanol were used extensively in European Grand Prix motor racing in the 1930s, and the most successful one with 86% methanol with acetone, nitrobenzene and ether additives was even commercially produced by the Standard Oil Company of New Jersey at the time.

Pure methanol is required by rule to be used in Monster Trucks, USAC sprint cars (as well as midgets, modifieds, etc.), and other dirt track series, such as World of Outlaws and High Limit Racing, and Motorcycle Speedway, mainly because, in the event of an accident, methanol does not produce an opaque cloud of smoke. Since the late 1940s, Methanol is also used as the primary fuel ingredient in the powerplants of radio control, control line and free flight model aircraft (see below), cars and trucks; such engines use a platinum filament glow plug that ignites the methanol vapor through a catalytic reaction. Drag racers, mud racers, and heavily modified tractor pullers also use methanol as the primary fuel source. Methanol is required with a supercharged engine in a Top Alcohol Dragster and, until the end of the 2006 season, all vehicles in the Indianapolis 500 had to run on methanol. As a fuel for mud racers, methanol mixed with gasoline and nitrous oxide produces more power than gasoline and nitrous oxide alone.

Beginning in 1965, pure methanol was used widespread in USAC Indy car competition, which at the time included the Indianapolis 500.

Safety was the predominant influence for the adoption of methanol fuel in the United States open-wheel racing categories. Unlike petroleum fires, methanol fires can be extinguished with plain water. A methanol-based fire burns invisibly, unlike gasoline, which burns with a visible flame. If a fire occurs on the track, there is no flame or smoke to obstruct the view of fast-approaching drivers, but this can also delay visual detection of the fire and the initiation of fire suppression. A seven-car crash on the second lap of the 1964 Indianapolis 500 resulted in USAC's decision to encourage, and later mandate, the use of methanol. Eddie Sachs and Dave MacDonald died in the crash when their gasoline-fueled cars exploded. The gasoline-triggered fire created a dangerous cloud of thick black smoke that completely blocked the view of the track for oncoming cars. Johnny Rutherford, one of the other drivers involved, drove a methanol-fueled car, which also leaked following the crash. While this car burned from the impact of the first fireball, it formed a much smaller inferno than the gasoline cars and one that burned invisibly. That testimony, and pressure from The Indianapolis Star writer George Moore, led to the switch to alcohol fuel in 1965.

Methanol was used by the CART circuit during its entire campaign (1979–2007). It is also used by many short track organizations, especially midget, sprint cars, and speedway bikes. Pure methanol was used by the IRL from 1996 to 2006.

In 2006, in partnership with the ethanol industry, the IRL used a mixture of 10% ethanol and 90% methanol as its fuel. Starting in 2007, the IRL switched to "pure" ethanol, E100.

Methanol fuel is also used extensively in drag racing, primarily in the Top Alcohol category, while between 10% and 20% methanol may be used in Top Fuel classes in addition to Nitromethane.

Formula One racing continues to use gasoline as its fuel, but in prewar grand prix racing methanol was often used in the fuel.

=== Maritime transport ===
In 2020, the International Maritime Organization adopted MSC.1/Circular.1621 codifying the proper usage and provisions for methanol as a fuel, in response to its growing usage in the maritime and shipping industries. As of 2023, roughly 100 methanol-burning ships have been ordered by key players in the industry including Maersk, COSCO Shipping, and CMA CGM. The majority of these ships contain dual-fuel engines, meaning they are capable of burning both bunker fuel and methanol.

Current challenges facing methanol as a fuel surround cost, availability, and emissions regulations. Retrofitting an oil barge to methanol can cost approximately $1.6M. Additionally, fossil-methanol increases the total GHG lifecycle and emissions through the production process. The vast majority of the global methanol output is fossil-based, which is produced using gas and coal. The availability of green-methanol (which is produced through zero or negative-carbon resources such as biomass) is currently limited and nearly twice the price of bunker fuel. However, accelerating the production of renewable methanol has been said not to be a significant global challenge, with many in the industry speculating that production could grow naturally as orders for methanol ships continue to be made. In 2023, the shipping-giant Maersk signed agreements with private green-methanol producers across various countries in order to fulfill the one million tons required to run its 19 ordered ships.

The United Arab Emirates is investing in refueling stations for green methanol in Egypt for the ships that use the Suez Canal.

=== Fuel for model engines ===
The earliest model engines for free-flight model aircraft flown before the end of World War II used a 3:1 mix of white gas and heavy viscosity motor oil for the two-stroke spark-ignition engines used for the hobby at that time. By 1948, the then-new innovation of glow plug-ignition model engines began to take over the market, requiring the use of methanol fuel to react in a catalytic reaction with the coiled platinum filament in a glow plug for the engine to run, usually using a castor oil-based lubricant contained in the fuel mix at about a 4:1 ratio. The glow-ignition variety of model engine, because it no longer required an onboard battery, ignition coil, ignition points and capacitor that a spark ignition model engine required, saved valuable weight and allowed model aircraft to have better flight performance. In their traditionally popular two-stroke and increasingly popular four-stroke forms, currently produced single-cylinder methanol-fueled glow engines are the usual choice for radio controlled aircraft for recreational use, for engine sizes that can range from 0.8 cm^{3} (0.049 cu.in.) to as large as 25 to 32 cm^{3} (1.5-2.0 cu.in) displacement, and significantly larger displacements for twin and multi-cylinder opposed-cylinder and radial configuration model aircraft engines, many of which are of four-stroke configuration. Most methanol-fueled model engines, especially those made outside North America, can easily be run on so-called FAI-specification methanol fuel. Such fuel mixtures can be required by the FAI for certain events in so-called FAI "Class F" international competition, that forbid the use of nitromethane as a glow engine fuel component. In contrast, firms in North America that make methanol-fueled model engines, or who are based outside that continent and have a major market in North America for such miniature powerplants, tend to produce engines that can and often do run best with a certain percentage of nitromethane in the fuel, which when used can be as little as 5% to 10% of volume, and can be as much as 25 to 30% of the total fuel volume.

=== Cooking ===
Methanol is used as a cooking fuel in China and its use in India is growing. Its stove and canister need no regulators or pipes.

=== Fuel cells ===
Methanol is used as fuel in fuel cells. Typically Reformed Methanol Fuel Cell (RMFC) or Direct Methanol Fuel Cell (DMFC) is used. Mobile and stationary applications are typical for methanol fuel cells such as backup power generation, power plant generation, emergency power supply, auxiliary power unit (APU) and battery range extension (electric vehicles, ships).

== Green methanol ==
Green methanol is a liquid fuel that is produced from combining carbon dioxide and hydrogen (CO_{2} + 3 H_{2} → CH_{3}OH + H_{2}O) under pressure and heat with catalysts. It is a way to reuse carbon capture for recycling. Methanol can store hydrogen economically at standard outdoor temperatures and pressures, compared to liquid hydrogen and ammonia that need to use a lot of energy to stay cold in their liquid state. In 2023 the Laura Maersk was the first container ship to run on methanol fuel. Ethanol plants in the midwest are a good place for pure carbon capture to combine with hydrogen to make green methanol, with abundant wind and nuclear energy in Iowa, Minnesota, and Illinois. Mixing methanol with ethanol could make methanol a safer fuel to use because methanol doesn't have a visible flame in the daylight and doesn't emit smoke, and ethanol has a visible light yellow flame. Green hydrogen production of 70% efficiency and a 70% efficiency of methanol production from that would be a 49% energy conversion efficiency.

== Toxicity ==
Methanol occurs naturally in the human body but is poisonous at high concentrations. The human body is capable of metabolizing and dealing with small amounts of methanol safely, such as from certain artificial sweeteners or fruit, temporarily resulting in toxic byproducts in the bloodstream like formic acid prior to excretion, whereas it is unable to safely metabolize more complex hydrocarbons like gasoline. Ingestion of as little as 3.16 grams of methanol can cause irreversible optic nerve damage, and the oral LD50 for humans is estimated to be 56.2 grams. Like many volatile chemicals, including ethanol and gasoline, methanol can damage skin, eyes, and lungs if exposed to substantial quantities. Those chronically exposed to such large quantities are at risk of developing long-term systemic health effects similar to low-grade methanol poisoning if left untreated.

US maximum allowed exposure in air (40 h/week) is 1900 mg/m^{3} for ethanol, 900 mg/m^{3} for gasoline, and 1260 mg/m^{3} for methanol. However, it is much less volatile than gasoline and therefore has lower evaporative emissions, producing a lower exposure risk for an equivalent spill. While methanol offers somewhat different toxicity exposure pathways, the effective toxicity is no worse than those of benzene or gasoline, and methanol poisoning is far easier to treat successfully. One substantial concern is that methanol poisoning generally must be treated while it is still asymptomatic for a full recovery.

Inhalation risk is mitigated by a characteristic pungent odor. At concentrations greater than 2,000 ppm (0.2%) it is generally quite noticeable, however, lower concentrations may remain undetected while still being potentially toxic over longer exposures, and may still present a fire/explosion hazard. Again, this is similar to gasoline and ethanol; standard safety protocols exist for methanol and are very similar to those for gasoline and ethanol.

The use of methanol fuel reduces the exhaust emissions of certain hydrocarbon-related toxins such as benzene and 1,3 butadiene and dramatically reduces long-term groundwater pollution caused by fuel spills. Unlike benzene-family fuels, methanol will rapidly and non-toxically biodegrade with no long-term harm to the environment as long as it is sufficiently diluted.

== Fire safety ==
Methanol is far more difficult to ignite than gasoline and burns about 60% slower. A methanol fire releases energy at around 20% of the rate of a gasoline fire, resulting in a much cooler flame. This results in a much less dangerous fire that is easier to contain with proper protocols. Unlike gasoline fires, water is acceptable and even preferred as a fire suppressant for methanol fires, since this both cools the fire and rapidly dilutes the fuel below the concentration where it will maintain self-flammability. These facts mean that, as a vehicle fuel, methanol has great safety advantages over gasoline. Ethanol shares many of these same advantages.

Since methanol vapor is heavier than air, it will linger close to the ground or in a pit unless there is good ventilation, and if the concentration of methanol is above 6.7% in the air it can be lit by a spark and will explode above 54 F / 12 C. Once ablaze, an undiluted methanol fire gives off very little visible light, making it potentially very hard to see the fire or even estimate its size in bright daylight, although, in the vast majority of cases, existing pollutants or flammables in the fire (such as tires or asphalt) will color and enhance the visibility of the fire. Ethanol, natural gas, hydrogen, and other existing fuels offer similar fire-safety challenges, and standard safety and firefighting protocols exist for all such fuels.

Post-accident environmental damage mitigation is facilitated by the fact that low-concentration methanol is biodegradable, of low toxicity, and non-persistent in the environment. Post-fire cleanup often merely requires large additional amounts of water to dilute the spilled methanol followed by vacuuming or absorption recovery of the fluid. Any methanol that unavoidably escapes into the environment will have little long-term impact, and with sufficient dilution will rapidly biodegrade with little to no environmental damage due to toxicity. A methanol spill that combines with an existing gasoline spill can cause the mixed methanol/gasoline spill to persist about 30% to 35% longer than the gasoline alone would have done.

== Use ==
In 2019, nearly 100 million tonnes of methanol were used, mainly for chemicals.

=== United States ===
The State of California ran an experimental program from 1980 to 1990 that allowed anyone to convert a gasoline vehicle to 85% methanol with 15% additives of choice. Over 500 vehicles were converted to high compression and dedicated use of the 85/15 methanol and ethanol.

In 1982 the big three were each given $5,000,000 for design and contracts for 5,000 vehicles to be bought by the State. It was an early use of low-compression flexible-fuel vehicles.

In 2005, California's Governor, Arnold Schwarzenegger, stopped the use of methanol to join the expanding use of ethanol driven by producers of corn. In 2007 ethanol was priced at 3 to 4 dollars per gallon (0.8 to 1.05 dollars per liter) at the pump, while methanol made from natural gas remains at 47 cents per gallon (12.5 cents per liter) in bulk, not at the pump.

Presently there are no operating gas stations in California supplying methanol in their pumps. Rep. Eliot Engel [D-NY17] has introduced "An Open Fuel Standard" Act in Congress: "To require automobile manufacturers to ensure that not less than 80 percent of the automobiles manufactured or sold in the United States by each such manufacturer to operate on fuel mixtures containing 85 percent ethanol, 85 percent methanol, or biodiesel."

=== European Union ===
The amended Fuel Quality Directive adopted in 2009 allows up to 3% v/v blend-in of methanol in petrol.

=== Brazil ===
A drive to add an appreciable percentage of methanol to gasoline got very close to implementation in Brazil, following a pilot test set up by a group of scientists involving blending gasoline with methanol between 1989 and 1992. The larger-scale pilot experiment that was to be conducted in São Paulo was vetoed at the last minute by the city's mayor, out of concern for the health of gas station workers, who would not be expected to follow safety precautions. As of 2006, the idea has not resurfaced.

=== India ===
Niti Aayog, the central planning institute of India, announced on 3 August 2018 that if feasible, passenger vehicles will run on 15% Methanol blended petrol. At present, vehicles in India use up to 10% ethanol-blended fuel. If approved by the government it will cut monthly fuel costs by 10%. In 2021, ethanol costs Rs 60 a litre, while the price of methanol has been estimated at less than Rs 25 a litre.

== See also ==
- Alcohol fuel
- Biofuel
- Butanol fuel
- Ethanol fuel
- Gasoline gallon equivalent
- Glow fuel
- Direct methanol fuel cell
- List of energy topics
- Liquid fuels
- Methanol
- Methanol economy
- Flex fuel vehicles
- Peak oil
- Reformed methanol fuel cell
- Timeline of alcohol fuel
- Dimethyl ether
