= Sprint Car engine =

Sprint Car motor

Layout
- Configuration: 90° pushrod V-8
- Displacement: 360–410 cu in (5.9–6.7 L)
- Valvetrain: Two-valves per cylinder to four-valves per cylinder
- Compression ratio: 13:1–17:1

Combustion
- Supercharger: None, naturally-aspirated
- Fuel system: Fuel injection
- Fuel type: Methanol
- Oil system: Dry sump

Output
- Power output: 700–900 hp (522–671 kW)
- Torque output: 600–700 lb⋅ft (813–949 N⋅m)

Dimensions
- Dry weight: approx. 455 lb (206 kg)

Sprint Cars are powered by a naturally-aspirated, methanol-injected overhead valve V-8 engines; with a displacement of 410 cubic inches (6.7L) and capable of engine speeds approaching 9000 rpm. A lower-budget and very popular class of sprint cars uses 360-cubic-inch (5.9L) engines that produce approximately 700 horsepower (520 kW).

== Applications ==
- Sprint cars
