= Nitro engine =

Engine which burns a nitromethane mix

A nitro engine generally refers to an engine powered with a fuel that contains some portion (usually between 10% and 40%) of nitromethane mixed with methanol. Nitromethane is a highly combustible substance that is generally only used in very specifically designed engines found in Top Fuel drag racing and in miniature internal combustion engines in radio control, control line and free flight model aircraft.

The term "nitro" is commonly used to describe these engines and has its origins in marketing hype in the model car market. For the fifty or so years prior to this term since the engines were first developed, they were simply referred to as "glow engines", but the term "nitro" has more impact in ad copy. These engines are actually fueled by methanol, but the fuel is often doped with nitromethane as a performance additive. The ignition system consists of a glow plug – hence the older term "glow" engine which has a coil of platinum-containing wire alloy, usually platinum–iridium. The glow plug is heated with electric current for starting, after which power is disconnected and the combination of residual heat and catalytic action of the platinum alloy with methanol ignites the fuel mixture.

== Working cycle ==
Nitro engines for models can turn in excess of 50,000 RPM. Typical operating rpm for sport model aircraft engines is 10,000–14,000 RPM. For radio control (RC) boats and ducted fan aircraft engines, 20,000–25,000 is the usual range, and for cars RPM in the range of 25,000–37,000 is common. With this much movement, a lot of frictional heat is generated and the fuel used for these engines usually contains between 12 and 30% oil content depending on the nitromethane and methanol percentage, the engine type and application. Most engines in RC cars today are two-stroke engines, which means that it takes two strokes of the piston (one revolution) to complete the engine cycle. On the first stroke as the piston travels upward, a mixture of fuel and air is sucked into the crankcase, from the carburettor. When the piston travels downward the new fuel air mixture travels into the induction port and finally into the combustion chamber. As the piston travels upward the mixture is compressed which causes the fuel/air mixture to ignite, producing hot gas under pressure to force the piston down. As the piston travels downward the spent exhaust gases escape out of the combustion chamber through the exhaust port, and the cycle starts over by the fuel mixture being again pushed into the induction port.

== Ignition ==
When starting, the glow plug is electrically preheated by electric current. The glow plug is not to be confused with a spark plug – there is no spark in the glow plug. Catalysis from methanol vapor on the heated platinum element keeps it red-hot even after voltage has been removed, which ignites the fuel and keeps the engine running. Whereas spark plugs are constantly used to ignite the fuel/air mix every time the piston comes up, as seen in the petrol engine where the spark plug is used, the fuel cannot be ignited with compression alone. It is the plug's temperature, still red-hot from previous ignition and from catalysis with the new compressed mixture, that ignites the fuel.

== Carburetor ==
Nitro engines typically use a carburetor to mix the fuel and air together, although for some applications where throttling is not required they have a simple venturi with a spraybar and needle valve. The carburetor can either be sliding or rotary. On a rotary carburetor, the slide is opened as the arm is turned by the servo. On a slide carburetor the slide is opened by sliding the arm out by the servo. Both are held open slightly by an idle screw which allows the engine to receive a very small amount of fuel to keep the engine running when the vehicle is at a stop. The carburetors usually feature two needles used to tune the mixture. A high speed needle tunes how much fuel is allowed into the carburetor at mid to high RPM, and a low speed needle determines how much fuel is allowed into the carburetor at low to mid range RPM. Turning either needle in a clockwise motion will thin the fuel mixture. Lean describes the amount of fuel in the fuel / air mixture. To a point this will make the engine run faster with better performance, but once too lean the engine will overheat, and wear out prematurely due to not receiving enough lubrication. Turning either needle counterclockwise will enrich the fuel mixture (unless the low speed needle is an air bleed in which case the opposite is true). Rich is the opposite of lean, it means more oil (fuel mixture) is entering the engine. If the engine is too rich, it will run poorly, and fuel that has not yet been burnt may start to spit out of the exhaust. The engine will run very slowly and seem to have no power and possibly cut out from being flooded with fuel. Although, being too rich is better than being too lean, because being too rich just means the engine is getting too much oil which is perfectly fine, although performance may not be as good as if the engine were lean. An excessively lean mixture can damage an engine in a short time, as it will run above its design temperature. A properly tuned engine will last a long time with good performance throughout its life.

== Variations ==
There are different types of R/C engines. There are on-road, off-road, aircraft, marine, and monster truck engines.

=== On-road and off-road ===
On-road engines are designed to come into their power band from mid to high RPM. These engines can be used in off-road vehicles but are normally used in on-road sedans where very high RPM and high speed is required. Off-road engines have a less abrupt power curve compared to on-road engines. Off-road engines have a power band that extends through most of the RPM range. Off-road engines do not rev as high as on-road engines, but they do have more torque that can easily propel the vehicle it is in to impressive speeds. Off-road engines are usually used in 1/8 scale buggies where high speeds and bad accelerations are less important.

=== Monster truck ===
Monster truck engines are generally very large compared to on-road and off-road engines. Where an off-road engine may be 0.21 cubic inches (3.4 cm^{3}) in size, a monster truck engine may be as much as 0.46 cubic inches (7.5 cm^{3}). Monster truck engines generate much of their torque and horsepower at low to mid range RPM. They are usually used in large and heavy trucks where all that power is needed to get good performance out of the vehicle.

=== Aircraft ===
Aircraft engines are manufactured to be able to sustain high RPM. The biggest difference between all other nitro engines and aircraft engines is the ability to sustain RPM. Other nitro engines tend to break if run at full throttle for a full tank of fuel.

=== Marine ===
Marine engines are cooled with water rather than air like other nitro engines.

== Drag racing ==
Members of the full scale drag racing industry use much higher concentrations of nitromethane: they are limited by the rules to 90% (at least in the NHRA, the main sanctioning body). Historically, racers used higher percentages which frequently caused massive explosions. Modern engines are estimated to generate around 8000 horsepower. The cars can accelerate from 0 to 100 mph in 0.8 seconds and 0 to 335 mph in 4.5 seconds.

== See also ==
- Nitrous oxide fuel blend
- Nitrous oxide engine
- Model engine
