= Model engine =

Internal combustion engine for models

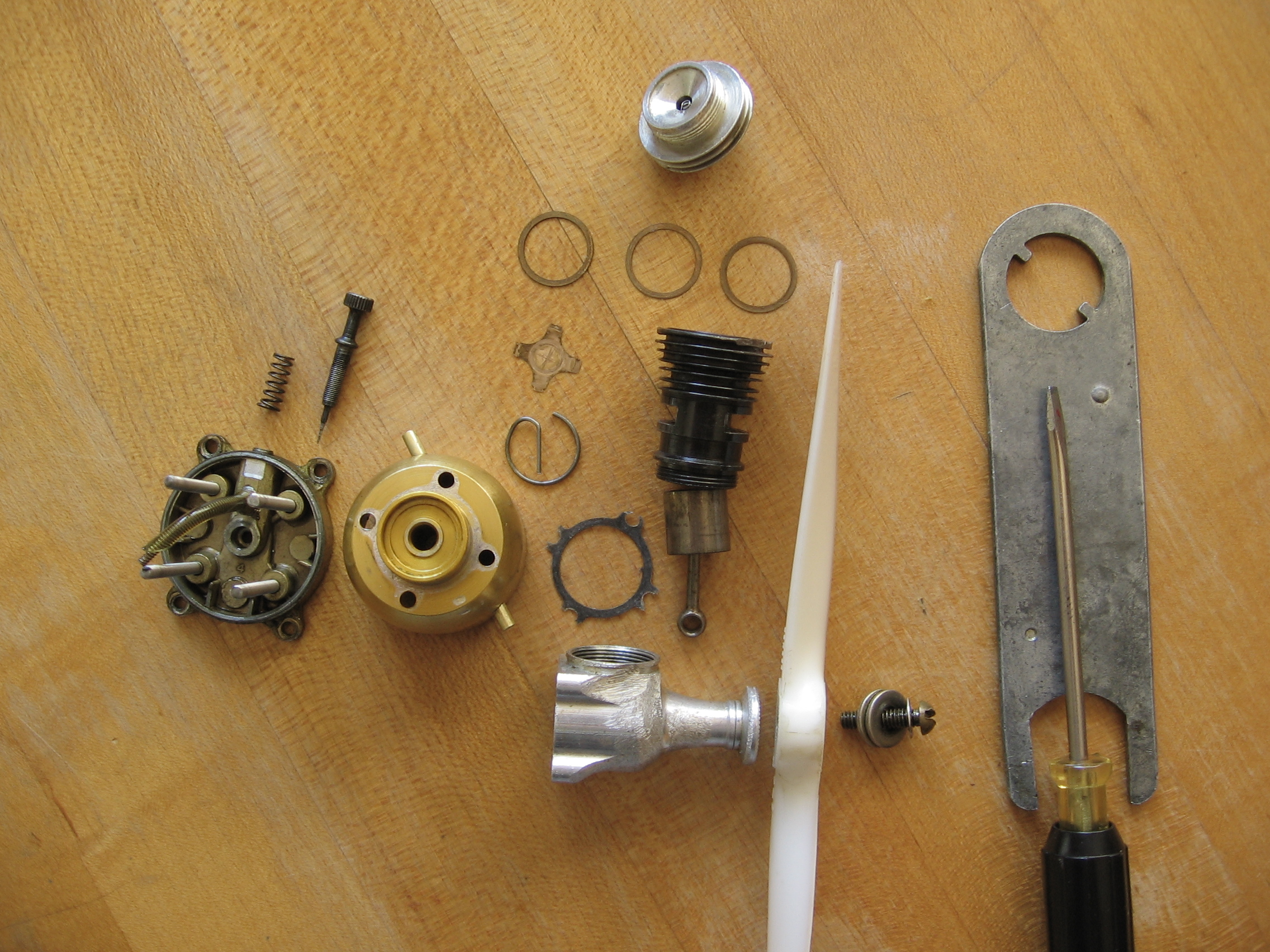
An old Cox Golden Bee 0.049 cubic inch (0.8 cubic cm.) reed valve engine disassembled. The weight is two and a quarter ounces with the propeller and large fuel tank, but without fuel.

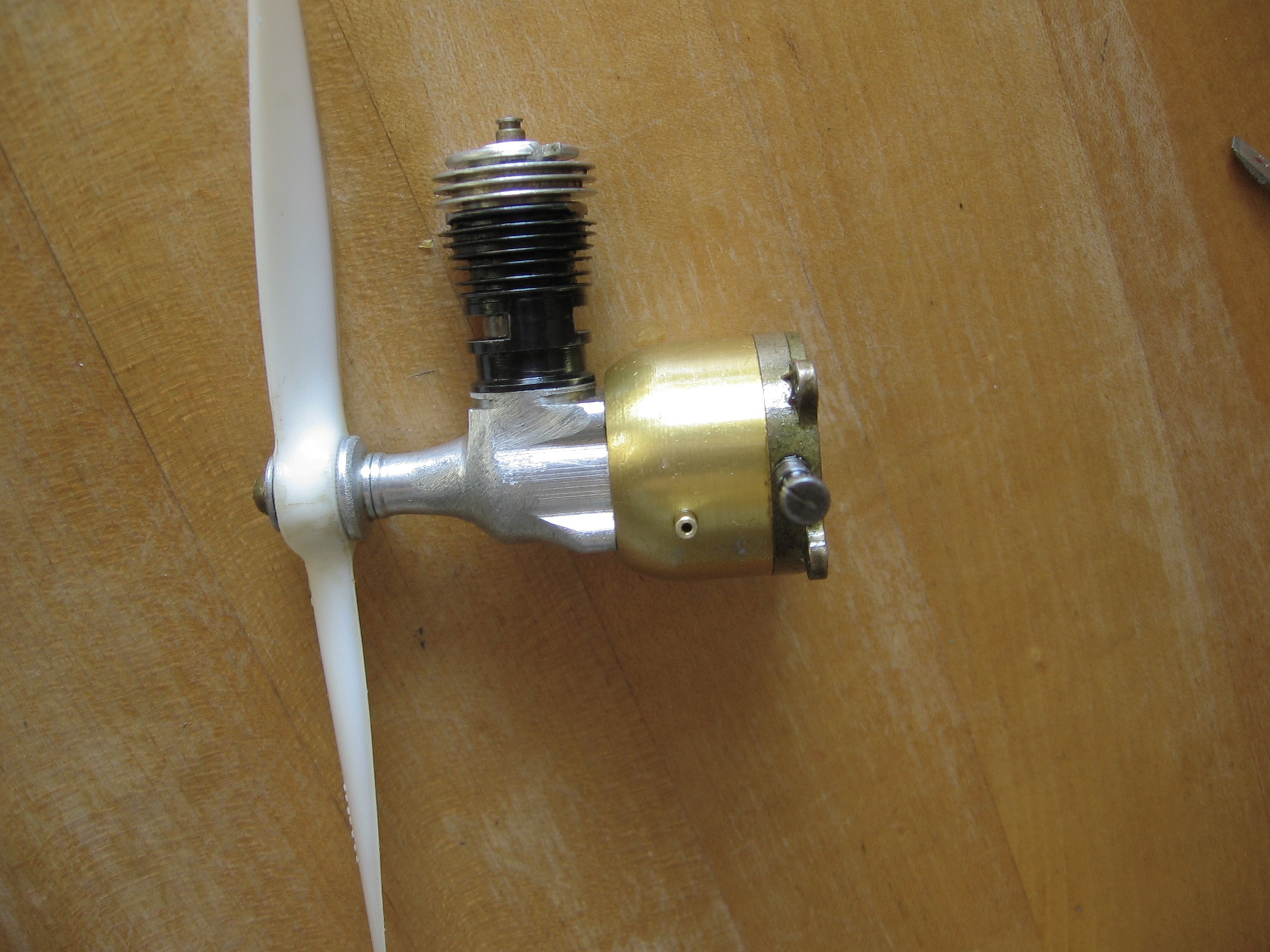
The same Cox Golden Bee 0.049 assembled. The left rotating propeller and horizontal cylinder contribute to keeping the control lines tight.

A model engine is a small internal combustion engine typically used to power a radio-controlled aircraft, radio-controlled car, radio-controlled boat, free flight, control line aircraft, or ground-running tether car model.

Because of the square–cube law, the behaviour of many engines does not always scale up or down at the same rate as the machine's size; usually at best causing a dramatic loss of power or efficiency, and at worst causing them not to work at all. Methanol and nitromethane are common fuels.

== Overview ==
The fully functional, albeit small, engines vary from the most common single-cylinder two-stroke to the exotic single and multiple-cylinder four-stroke, the latter taking shape in boxer, v-twin, inline and radial form, a few Wankel engine designs are also used. Most model engines run on a blend of methanol, nitromethane, and lubricant (either castor or synthetic oil).

Two-stroke model engines, most often designed since 1970 with Schnuerle porting for best performance, range in typical size from .12 cubic inches (2 cubic centimeters) to 1.2 ci (19.6 cc) and generate between .5 horsepower (370 watts) to 5 hp (3.7 kW), can get as small as .010 ci (.16 cc) and as large as 3-4 ci (49–66 cc). Four-stroke model engines have been made in sizes as small as 0.20 in3 (3.3 cc) for the smallest single-cylinder models, all the way up to 3.05 in3 (50 cc) for the largest size for single-cylinder units, with twin- and multi-cylinder engines on the market being as small as 10 cc for opposed-cylinder twins, while going somewhat larger in size than 50 cc, and even upwards to well above 200 cc for some model boxer opposed-piston, inline and radial engines. While the methanol and nitromethane blended "glow fuel" engines are the most common, many larger (especially above 15 cc/0.90 ci displacement) model engines, both two-stroke and a growing number of four-stroke examples are spark ignition, and are primarily fueled with gasoline — with some examples of both two and four-stroke glow plug-designed methanol aeromodeling engines capable, with aftermarket upgrades, to having battery-powered, electronically controlled spark ignition systems replacing the glow plugs normally used. Model engines refitted in such a manner often run more efficiently on methanol-based glow plug engine fuels, often with the ability to exclude the use of nitromethane altogether in their fuel formulas.

This article concerns itself with the methanol engines; gasoline-powered model engines are similar to those built for use in string trimmers, chainsaws, and other yard equipment, unless they happen to be purpose-built for aeromodeling use, being especially true for four-stroke gasoline-fueled model engines. Such engines usually use a fuel that contains a small percentage of motor oil as a two-stroke engine uses for lubrication purposes, as most model four-stroke engines — be they glow plug or spark ignition — have no built-in reservoir for motor oil in their crankcase or engine block design.

The majority of model engines have used, and continue to use, the two-stroke cycle principle to avoid needing valves in the combustion chamber, but a growing number of model engines use the four-stroke cycle design instead. Both reed valve and rotary valve-type two-strokes are common, with four-stroke model engines using either conventional poppet valve, and rotary valve formats for induction and exhaust.

The engine shown to the right has its carburetor in the center of the zinc alloy casting to the left. (It uses a flow restriction, like the choke on an old car engine, because the venturi effect is not effective on such a small scale.) The valve reed, cross shaped above its retainer spring, is still beryllium copper alloy, in this old engine. The glow plug is built into the cylinder head. Large production volume makes it possible to use a machined cylinder and an extruded crank case (cut away by hand in the example shown). These Cox Bee reed valve engines are notable for their low cost and ability to survive crashes. The components of the engine shown come from several different engines.

== Comparison of engines ==
Images of a glowplug engine and a "diesel" engine are shown below for comparison. The most obvious external difference is seen on top of the cylinder head. The glowplug engine's glow plug has a pinlike terminal for its center contact, which is an electrical connector for the glowplug. The "diesel" engine has a T-bar which is used for adjusting the compression. The cylindrical object behind the glowplug engine is an exhaust silencer or muffler.

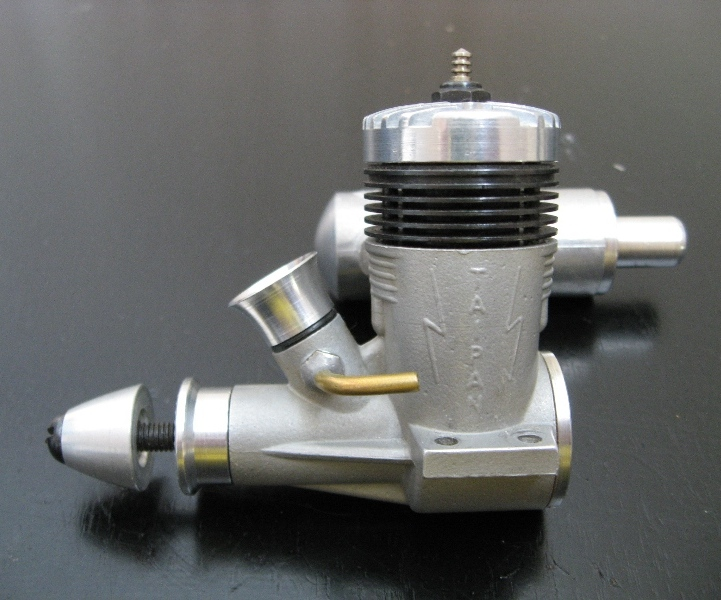
Glowplug engine

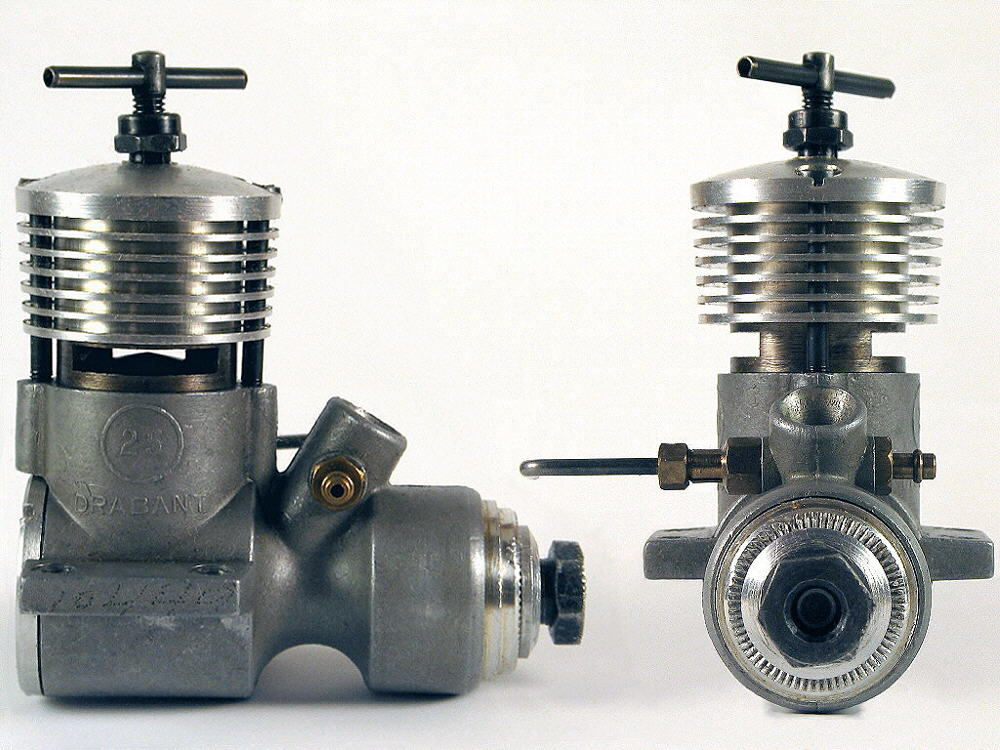
Diesel engine

== Glowplug engines ==
Glow plugs are used for starting as well as continuing the power cycle. The glow plug consists of a durable, mostly platinum, helically wound wire filament, within a cylindrical pocket in the plug body, exposed to the combustion chamber. A small direct current voltage (around 1.5 volts) is applied to the glow plug, the engine is then started, and the voltage is removed. The burning of the fuel/air mixture in a glow-plug model engine, which requires methanol for the glow plug to work in the first place, and sometimes with the use of nitromethane for greater power output and steadier idle, occurs due to the catalytic reaction of the methanol vapor to the presence of the platinum in the filament, thus causing the ignition. This keeps the plug's filament glowing hot, and allows it to ignite the next charge.

Since the ignition timing is not controlled electrically, as in a spark ignition engine or by fuel injection, as in an ordinary diesel, it must be adjusted by the richness of the mixture, the ratio of nitromethane to methanol, the compression ratio, the cooling of the cylinder head, the type of glow plug, etc. A richer mixture will tend to cool the filament and so retard ignition, slowing the engine, and a rich mixture also eases starting. After starting the engine can easily be leaned (by adjusting a needle valve in the spraybar) to obtain maximum power. Glowplug engines are also known as nitro engines. Nitro engines require a 1.5 volt ignitor to light the glow plug in the heat sink. Once primed, pulling the starter with the ignitor in will start the engine.

== Diesel engines ==
Diesel engines are an alternative to methanol glow plug engines. These "diesels" run on a mixture of kerosene, ether, castor oil or vegetable oil, and cetane or amyl nitrate booster. Despite their name, their use of compression ignition, and the use of a kerosene fuel that is similar to diesel, model diesels share very little with full-size diesel engines.

Full-size diesel engines, such as those found in a truck, are fuel injected and either two-stroke or four-stroke. They use compression ignition to ignite the mixture: the compression within the cylinder heats the inlet charge sufficiently to cause ignition, without requiring an applied ignition source. A fundamental feature of such engines, unlike petrol (gasoline) engines, is that they draw in air alone and the fuel is only mixed by being injected into the combustion chamber separately. Model diesel engines are instead a carbureted two-stroke using the crankcase for compression. The carburetor supplies a mixture of fuel and air into the engine, with the proportions kept fairly constant and their total volume throttled to control the engine power.

Apart from sharing the diesel's use of compression ignition, their construction has more in common with a small two-stroke motorcycle or lawnmower engine. In addition to this, model diesels have variable compression ratios. This variable compression is achieved by a "contra-piston", at the top of the cylinder, which can be adjusted by a screwed "T-bar". The swept volume of the engine remains the same, but as the volume of the combustion chamber at top dead centre is changed by adjusting the contra-piston, the compression ratio (swept volume + combustion chamber / combustion chamber) changes accordingly.

Model diesels are found to produce more torque than glow engines of the same displacement, and are thought to get better fuel efficiency, because the same power is produced at a lower rpm, and in a smaller displacement engine. However, the specific power may not be significantly superior to a glow engine, due to the heavier construction needed to assure that the engine can withstand the much higher compression ratio, sometimes reaching 30:1. Diesels also run significantly quieter, due to the more rapid combustion, unlike two-stroke glow engines, in which combustion may still be occurring when the exhaust ports are uncovered, causing a significant amount of noise.

Recent developments in model engineering have produced true diesel model engines, with a traditional injector and injector pump, and these engines operate in the same way as a large diesel engine.

== See also ==
- Four-stroking
- Glow plug (model engine)
- Glow fuel
- Nitro engine
- Schnuerle porting, used on model two-stroke engines since the 1970s

=== Makers ===
- Bullitt Engines
- Cox Model Engines
- Enya Model Engines (two and four-stroke model engines)
- FOX Manufacturing
- FX Royal Racing Engines
- K&B Manufacturing
- Laser Engines
- LRP electronic (rebranded OS Engines)
- Mantua Models
- GAUI GPOWER
- MECOA
- Motori Cipolla
- Ninja Engine
- Novarossi
- nVision
- O.S. Engines (two and four-stroke model engines)
- OPS (engine)
- Picco Micromotori
- RB Products
- rcvengines
- Reds Racing
- Saito Seisakusho (four-stroke and model steam engine specialist)
- Team Orion
- Thunder Tiger
- Webra
- Yamada Engines (YS) (two and four-stroke model engines)
