= Glow fuel =

Model engine fuel

Glow fuel is a fuel source used in model engines – generally the same or similar fuels can be used in model airplanes, helicopters, cars and boats. Glow fuel can be burned by very simple two-stroke engines or by more complicated four-stroke engines, and these engines can provide impressive amounts of power for their very small size. Glow fuel is primarily for two-stroke engines with the need for oil mixed in the fuel and limited exhaust and fuel/air between cycles. Top Fuel race cars with 4-stroke engines may also use glow fuel, but in this case it does not contain appreciable oil.

== Name ==
Other commonly used names are nitro or just model fuel. Note that the nitro name is generally inaccurate, as nitromethane is usually not the primary ingredient, and in fact many glow fuels, especially the so-called "FAI" type, named for the Fédération Aéronautique Internationale, which requires such fuel in some forms of aeromodeling competition, contain no nitromethane at all.

== Ingredients ==
Glow fuel is a mixture of methanol, nitromethane, and oil.

Methanol is the primary ingredient as it provides the bulk of the fuel, and is needed as a solvent for the other ingredients. The presence of methanol vapor causes the glow plug found in model engines to heat via a catalytic reaction with the platinum wire and glow.

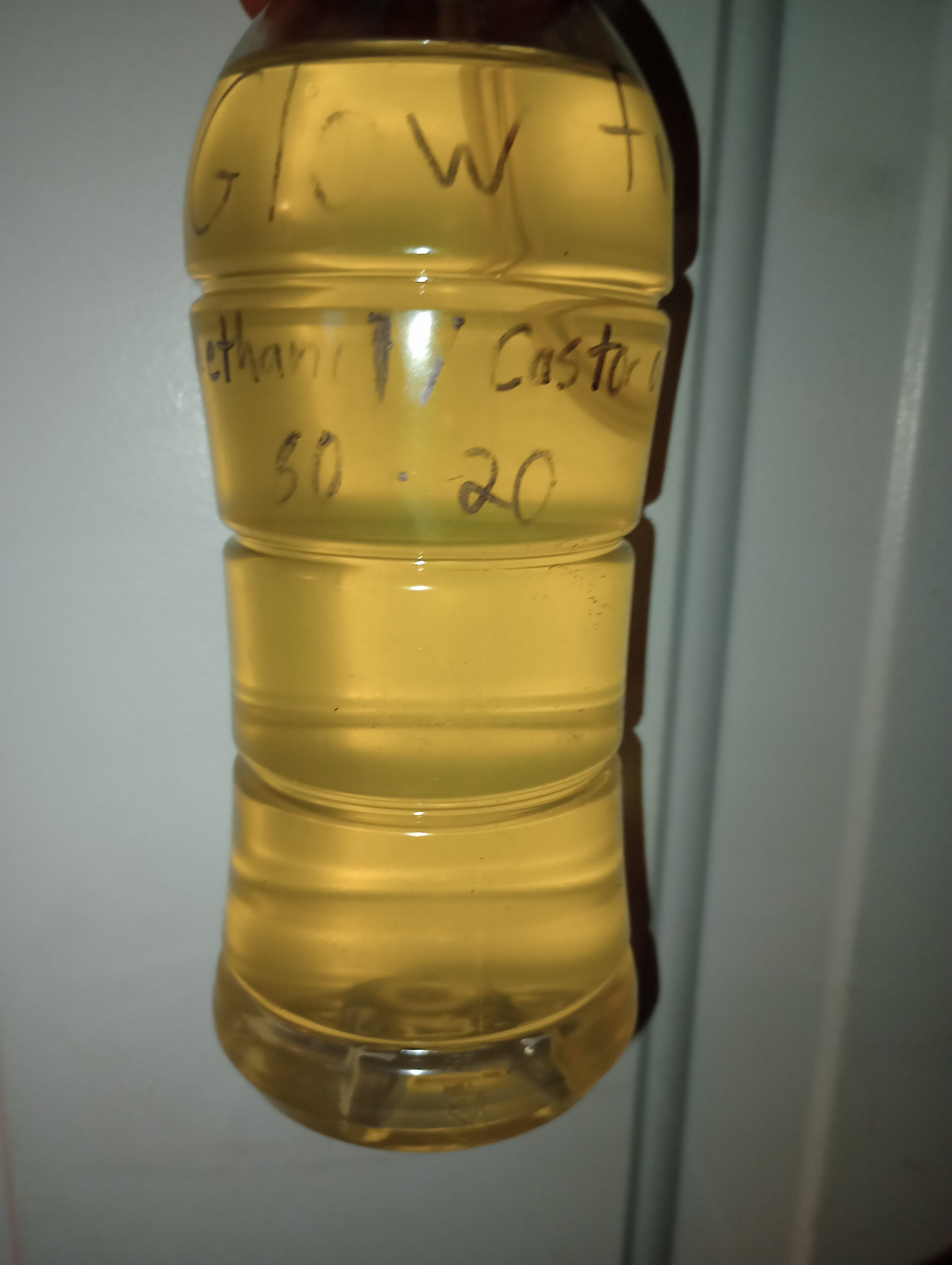
Example of glow fuel blended with no nitromethane; it contains only methanol and castor oil.

Nitromethane is added to the methanol to increase power and to make the engine easier to tune. Typically glow fuel is about 0–30% nitromethane. While higher concentrations can result in better engine performance, use of highly concentrated nitromethane is rare because of its cost. Although a given amount of nitromethane contains less energy than the same amount of methanol, it increases the amount of available oxygen in the combustion chamber, which allows the engine to draw in less air and more fuel. The increased amount of fuel increases power output and also helps cool the engine. For racing use, the nitromethane content can be increased to the range of 30–65 in many countries, so in these countries glow fuel typically has no nitromethane at all, which is generally not detrimental to engine longevity.

== Lubrication ==
Most model engines require oil to be included with the fuel as a lubricant since the engine has no independent oiling capability. Model engine fuel is typically 8-22% oil, with the higher percentages run in older design two-stroke glow engines that use bushings for the crankshaft bearings. The most commonly used lubricants are castor oil and synthetic oils, and many glow fuels include a mixture of the two. The oils included in glow fuel generally are not burned by the engine, and are expelled out the exhaust of the engine. This also helps the engine dissipate heat, as the oil emitted is generally hot.

Four-stroke model engines, since they are generally designed to be simple power plants while still incorporating the usual camshaft, rocker arms and poppet valves of larger sized four-stroke engines, are generally meant to use glow ignition and their fuel. Often, the oil percentage for four-stroke glow fuel can be lowered from the 18–20% figure used for some two-stroke engines, down to as low as a 12–15% (neither YS or Saito recommend using so called 4-stroke fuels as they feel the fuel does not contain enough oil to lubricate properly), but use of such low-lubricant fuel can also mandate the need for a small amount of castor oil in the mix (most modern Glow Fuels contain some percentage of Castor oil along with a higher percentage of synthetic oil), and mandates setting the high-speed fuel mixture carefully by using a handheld tachometer to check engine speed to avoid over-leaning of the fuel mixture.

Glow engines generally have to be run slightly rich with a higher fuel/air ratio than is ideal in order to keep the engine cool. The uncombusted fuel in the exhaust carries heat, providing the cooling effect. Because of this, vehicles with glow engines are generally heavily coated with oil. Almost all the oil mixed with the fuel is unconsumed and comes out the exhaust, as well as some of the nitromethane and methanol as well. This requires some cleaning.

The nitromethane in many glow fuel blends can cause corrosion of metal parts in model engines, especially four-stroke designs, due to the nitric acid residue formed from combustion of nitromethane-containing fuel, making the use of a so-called "after-run oil" a common practice after a model flying session with a four-stroke glow-engine-powered model.

Glow fuel is not difficult to make, so many modelers mix their own to save money, but some of the ingredients are flammable or explosive and can be dangerous (and difficult to obtain for the general modeler), especially in large quantities. Most modelers buy their glow fuel premixed.

== Alternatives ==
Nitromethane is sometimes replaced or supplemented by nitroethane. Propylene oxide is sometimes added in small percentages. Another form of model fuel used for small compression ignition engines is called "Diesel Fuel" and generally consists of kerosene, ether, oil and some sort of ignition improver, usually amyl nitrate or isopropyl nitrate. Note that "Diesel Fuel" is a misnomer, as this model fuel is wholly unrelated to the automotive fuel used in modern diesel engines.
