= Free flight (model aircraft) =

Model aviation involving no external control after launch

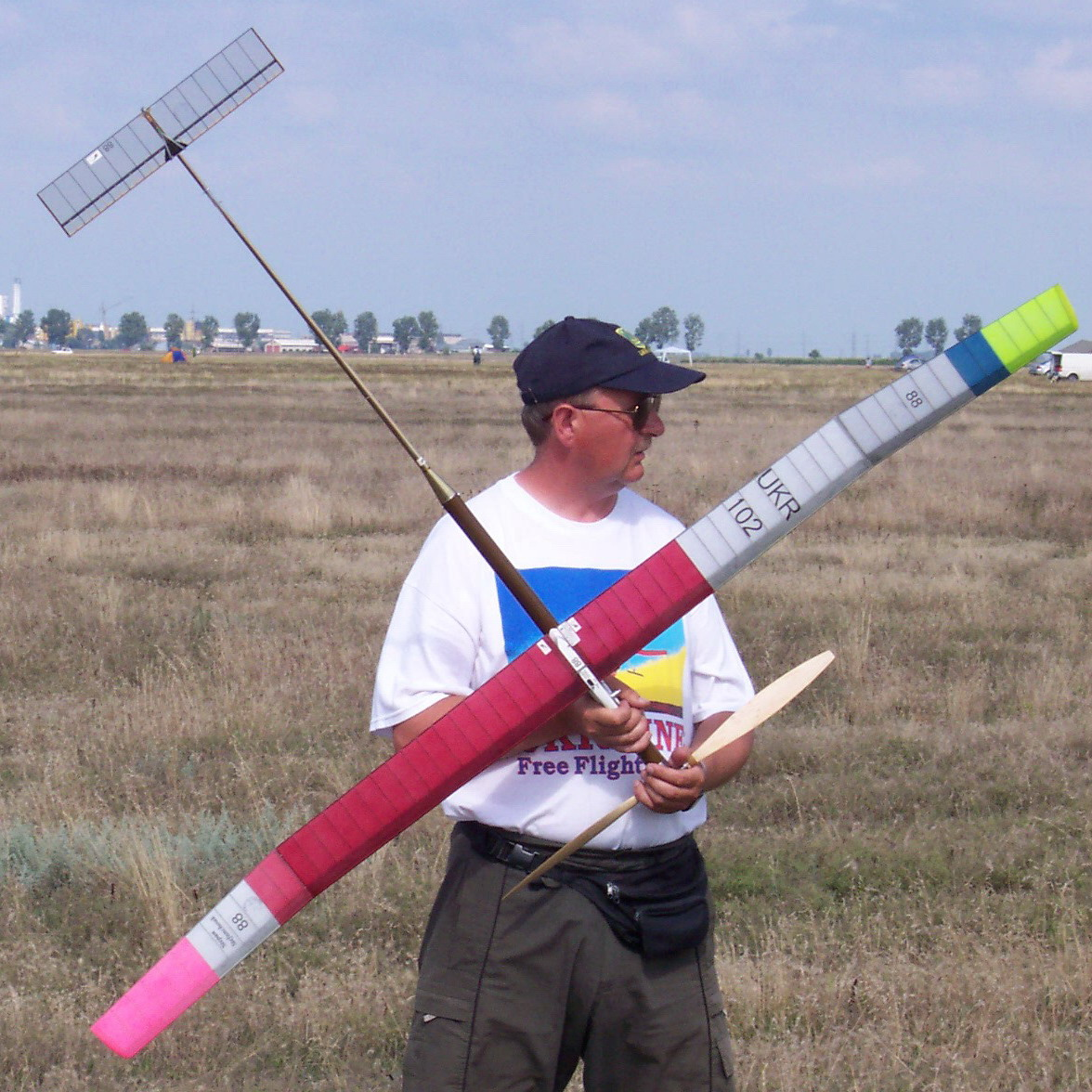
F1B Model by Stepan Stepanchuk

Free flight is the segment of model aviation involving aircraft with no active external control after launch. Free flight is the original form of hobby aeromodeling, with the competitive objective being to build and launch a self controlling aircraft that will consistently achieve the longest flight duration over multiple competition rounds, within various class parameters.

== Description ==
The essence of free-flight is that the aircraft have no need for external control, for instance by radio. Aircraft of this type have been flown for over two centuries. They are designed to be inherently stable in flight; if disturbed by a gust of wind or a thermal current they will return automatically to stable flight. Their stability is achieved by a combination of design and trim, - the relationship between centre of gravity, wing and tailplane incidence and rudder setting.

With their much lower wing loading, free-flight aircraft fly much more slowly than the engine-powered radio-controlled aircraft that many people first think of when ‘model aircraft’ is mentioned. Most of them glide at little more than walking pace and few weigh more than 500 grams.

Usually the sole objective of free-flight competition is flight duration, and one of the sport's fascinations and challenges is to design the most efficient aircraft within the various competition limits on parameters such as minimum weight, maximum wing area, and motive power.

== Types ==
Free flight models may be broadly divided into four categories:

- Gliders (towline and hand-launched)
- Rubber-powered (pure duration, and scale with duration)
- Power (CO_{2}, methanol-fueled glow engine, or electric)
- Indoor (pure duration, and scale with duration)

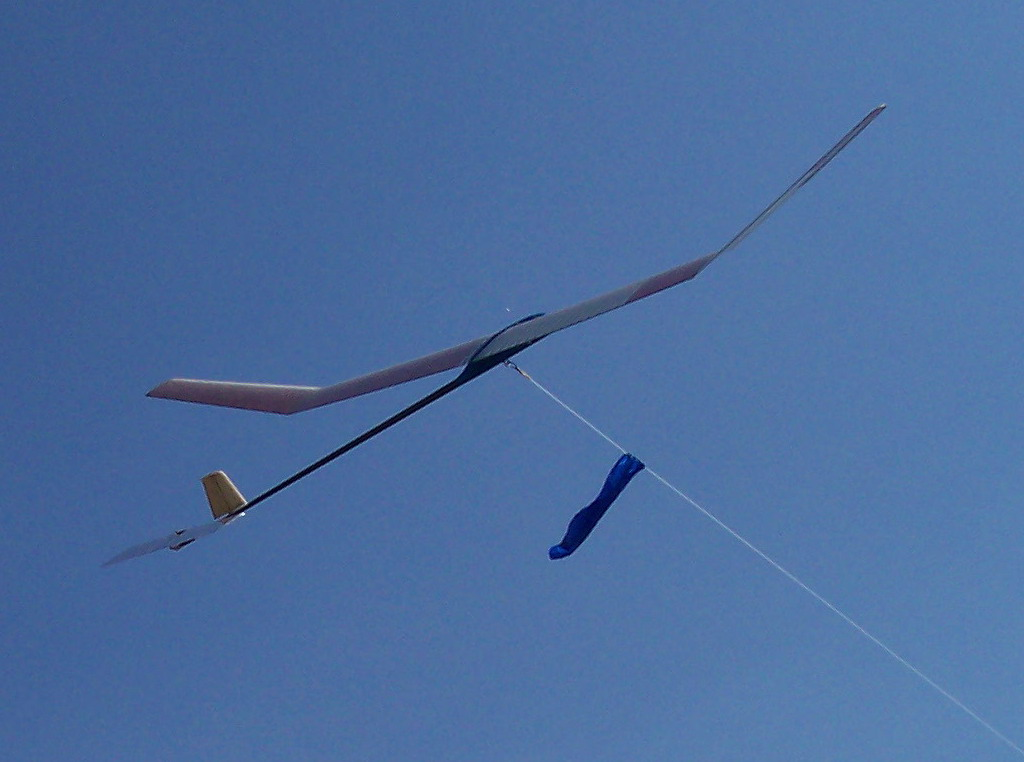
F1A Towing

When flown competitively, the usual aim is maximum flight duration. In the case of models flown outdoors, the modeler attempts to launch the model into a rising column of air, a thermal. These outdoor free flight models tend to be designed for two very different flying modes: climbing rapidly under power or tow, and gliding slowly while circling with minimum fall rate. Much of the challenge in designing and flying these models is to maintain aerodynamic stability in both modes and to make a smooth transition between them. Modern models use mechanical or electronic timers to move control surfaces at preset times. Detecting the thermal into which to launch is vital and can involve several methods, ranging from radio telemetered temperature and wind speed measurements plotted on a chart recorder to Mylar streamers or soap bubbles to visualize the rising air.

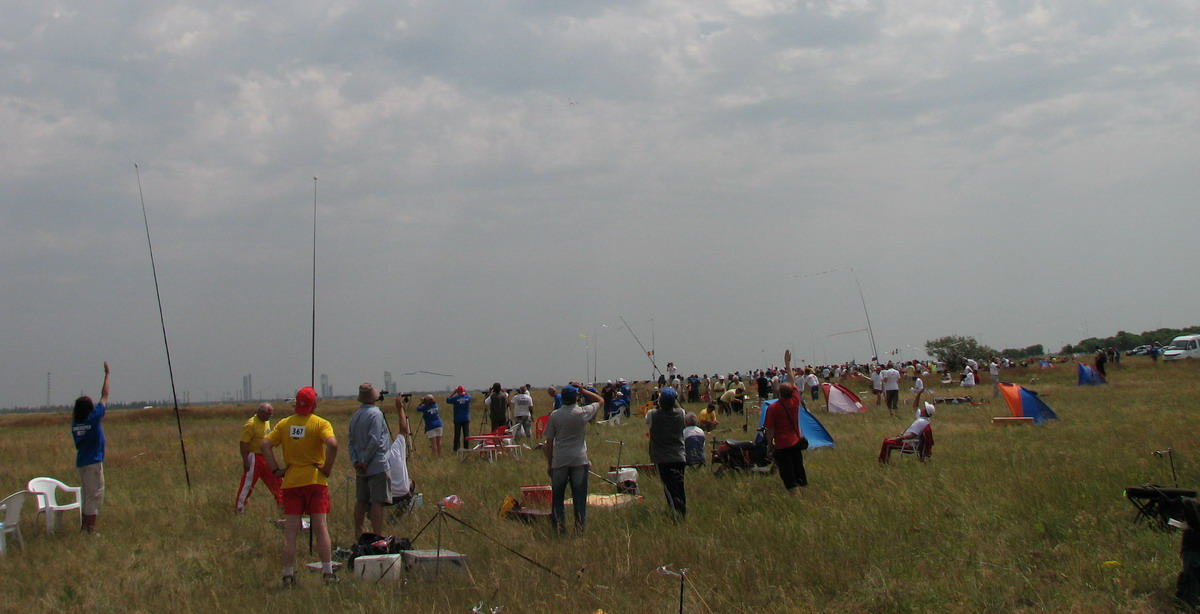
2007 FAI Free Flight World Championships in Odesa, Ukraine

Competitions normally involve up to seven rounds during the day, each flown to a maximum flight time hard to achieve without thermal assistance. An automatic on-board time switch upsets the trim of the aircraft when the "max" is achieved, to bring the aircraft down safely and quickly. Locating and recovering the aircraft for further flights is an important part of free-flight. Many aircraft carry radio location beacons, and flyers will use GPS, binoculars, a compass, and a directionally sensitive radio tracking receiver to assist them. A day's flying and retrieval may well involve 20 miles (32 km) or so on foot or on bike, depending on wind strength.

Models flown indoors do not depend on rising air currents, but they must be designed for maximum flight efficiency because of the limited energy stored in the rubber or electric power source.

Within each category, there are different classes. Typically, there is a Fédération Aéronautique Internationale (FAI) world-championship class, a so-called mini class, an open class, and possibly any number of national or unofficial classes, for which regional or national competitions may be held. Within the competition classification codes specified by the FAI, free flight aeromodeling gets the generic code of F1, where the "F" stands for flying model aircraft in general, with the "1" standing specifically for free flight models.

== Gliders ==
Gliders have no onboard motive power. The only energy inputs are the launch, and rising air encountered during the flight. During launch, many gliders withstand 60G or more (far more than the stress on any crewed aircraft) and have launch speeds of sometimes over 140 km/h, where this energy converts to altitude; this has only become possible since the advent of composite materials such as carbon (graphite), fiberglass, and Kevlar, which are used extensively in many of their structures.

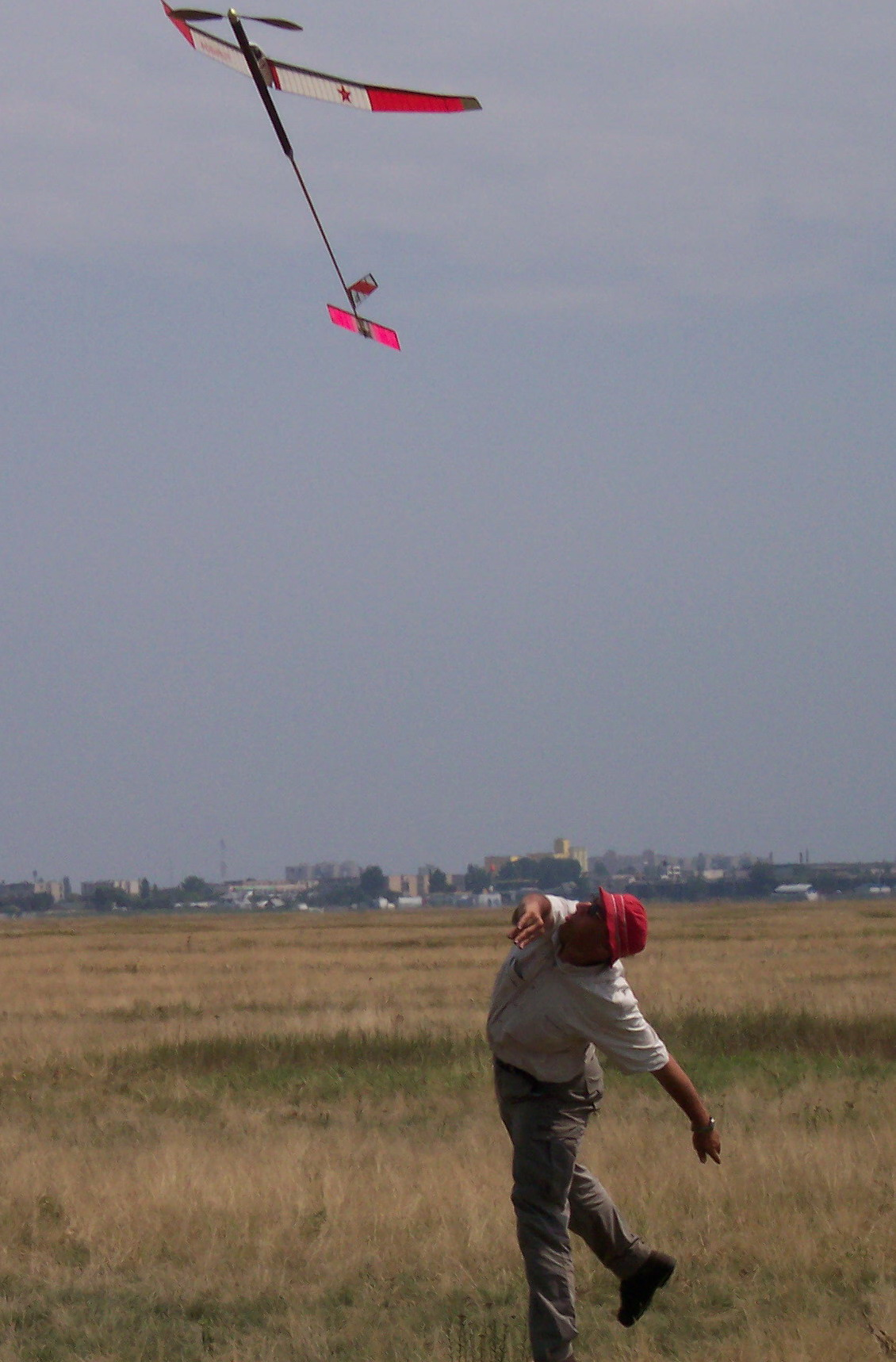
F1B Launch

The FAI glider class is F1A, also known as A/2 or Nordic glider. The model must have a projected area (wing and stabilizer) of between 32 and 34 dm^{2}, and a minimum weight of 410 g. Launch is by hand tow, using a tow line of 50 m length, similar to towing a kite. During the tow phase, the glider can be controlled by letting it glide in tight circles followed by towing it up against the wind. Once the decision is taken to launch the model, the sportsman runs to make the model gain speed. When the model is at maximum speed overhead, the tow line is released and a mechanism frees the tow line from the model which then starts a pre-programmed pattern to convert speed into altitude. Modern F1A gliders can gain sometimes as much as 80 meters of additional altitude. The mini glider class is A/1 (F1H). A/1 gliders must have less than 18 dm^{2} total area, and weigh at least 220 g. Open glider contests are rarely flown, and most competitors in such contests use F1A gliders. Other glider classes include magnet-steered (F1E) gliders - essentially a free flight slope soaring class, and hand-launched glider (usually abbreviated HLG, and also widely known as simply chuck glider). HLGs are small models which are launched from level ground simply by being thrown hard. This is one of the more athletic of the free flight disciplines.

== Rubber powered ==
Rubber-powered models are powered by the stored energy of a twisted elastic material. These range from the simple rubber-band powered toys available in many toy stores, up to the open rubber class, examples of which often use 200 g of rubber in their "motor". Rubber does not produce a constant power output; when fully wound a rubber motor produces its maximum torque, but this drops rapidly at first before 'plateauing', finally declining again, after which the propeller stops. Using this initial burst efficiently is vital, and automatic variable-pitch propellers help here, together with timer-operated changes of wing and tailplane incidence and of rudder setting. At the end of the power run the blades fold back alongside the fuselage to minimise drag during the glide.

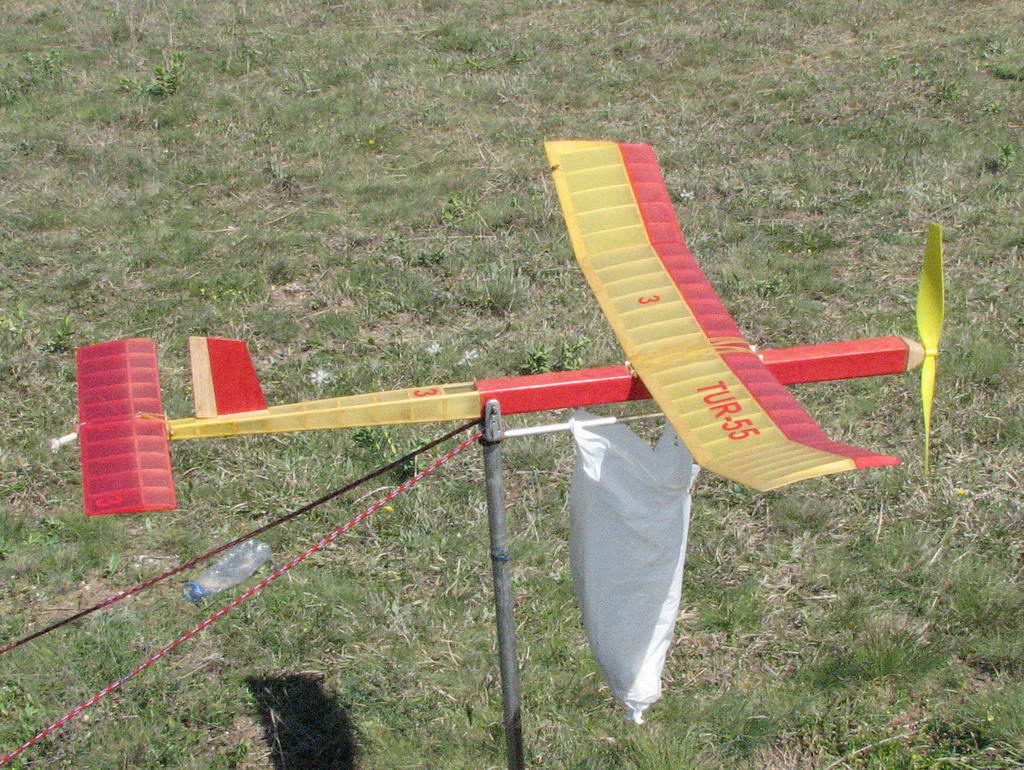
P-30 at stooge

The FAI rubber class is F1B, also known as Wakefield. Charles Dennis Rushing has written on the history of the Wakefield Cup. F1B models may have a maximum of 30 g of rubber motor, and the empty weight of the airframe must be at least 200 g. The maximum total area of the model must be less than 19 dm^{2}. The mini rubber class is Coupe d'Hiver (also known as F1G). "Coupe" models have no area restrictions. The maximum weight of rubber allowed is 10 g, and the minimum empty weight of the airframe is 70g.. Open rubber is a popular event, featuring large models with enormous amounts of rubber crammed into them. Open models often have 50% of their flying weight composed of rubber.

The F1D (see #Indoor below) is a class of delicate, lightweight, slow-flying, long-duration (over 30 minutes) rubber-powered aircraft designed to be flown in a large indoor space.

P-30 is a common beginner's event. A P-30 must use an unmodified commercially available plastic propeller. P-30 has a maximum wingspan and overall length of 30 inches (76.2 cm), and uses maximum 10 g of rubber. The empty airframe must weigh at least 40 g.

The Wright Stuff competition in Science Olympiad is also very popular. The rules and dimension restrictions vary every year, but many notable fliers such as Brett Sanborn started in Science Olympiad. Planes for this competition usually consist of a balsa frame with a mylar-covered wing and a commercially available fixed-pitch propeller. The rubber motor is typically wound with a 15:1 winder.

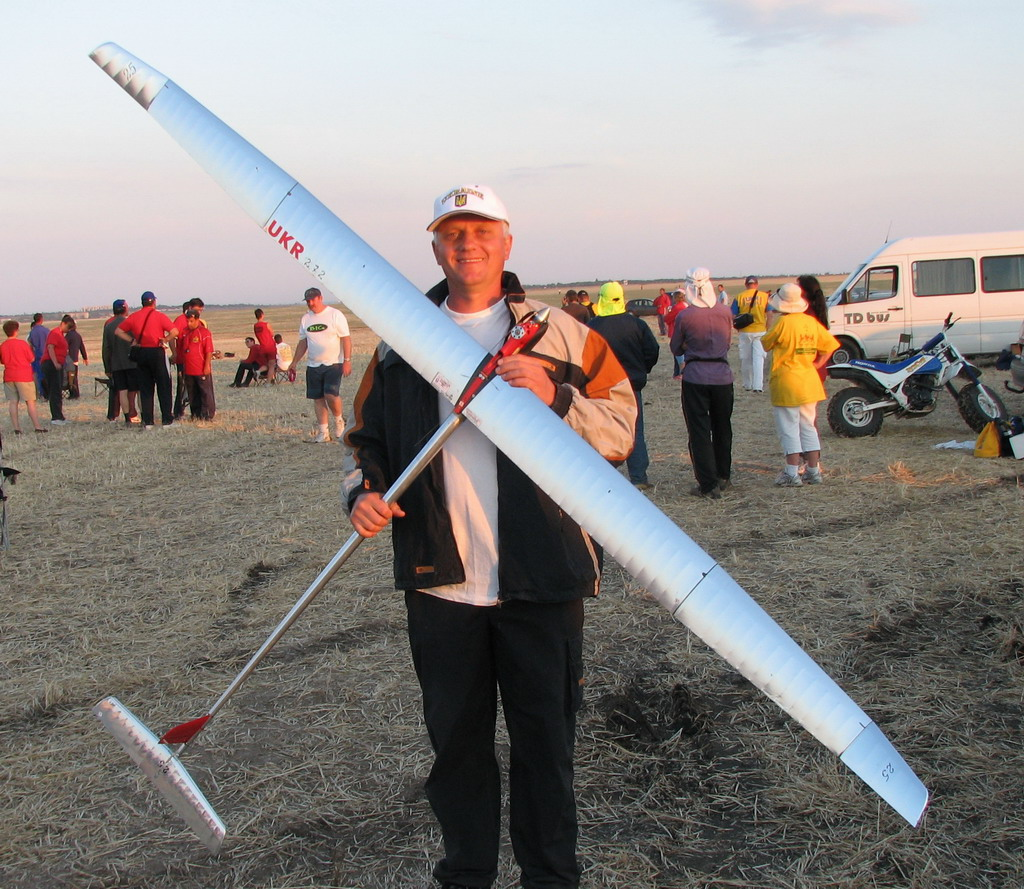
F1C Model by Eugene Verbitsky (WC). Note the folding wings

The most well known beginner rubber powered models are the AMA Cub (also known in the US as the "AMA Delta Dart"), Denny Dart, Canarsie Canarie and Squirrel. They are commonly used in workshops or for beginners to learn about construction and flying.

The Squirrel, designed by Darcy Whyte is the easiest to build. Free plans are available for download for a Squirrel.

The smallest rubber powered model aircraft was built in 1931 by a Philadelphia high school student, called the Flying Flea and was one and a quarter inches long and could remain airborne for approximately one minute.

== Power ==
Power models are those with an onboard power source which is not a rubber motor. Frequently this is an internal combustion engine, and the engine run is limited, typically to just five seconds. Designing an aircraft which climbs as high as possible, with minimum drag at a low lift coefficient, but then must convert to a slow flying glider, is a challenge unique in aviation. However, the category also includes compressed gas motors and electric power. The FAI power class is F1C. F1C models are equipped with an internal combustion engine of up to 2.5cc and need to weight at least 300 g per 1cc (i.e. minimum weight of a 2.5cc equipped model is 750 g). These engines are usually custom made for optimal power output and often yield 1 hp (0.75 kW) at more than 30,000 RPM. Many F1C models feature folding wings, to minimize the aerodynamic drag during the climb phase.

Another type of powered free flight models is CO_{2} (its FAI category is F1K ). These models fly using a small engine powered by carbon dioxide. These models are very light. The amount of CO_{2} is limited to 2 cm^{3}, which is enough for cca. 2 minutes of flight.

Another popular free flight Class is FAI category F1J which is similar to F1C however the engines are 1cc displacement or less. These models use engines like the Profi, and other specialized manufactured engines from Russia and Europe.

Sport free flight fliers also use small internal combustion engines, and increasingly; electric motor-powered free flight scale models.

== Indoor ==
As the name suggests, indoor models are designed to fly indoors. These models are typically very light in weight because they do not have to withstand external weather conditions.

There are a number of classes of indoor free flight models. Some are scale reproductions but others are designed purely to fly for as long as possible. These models are timed with a stopwatch.

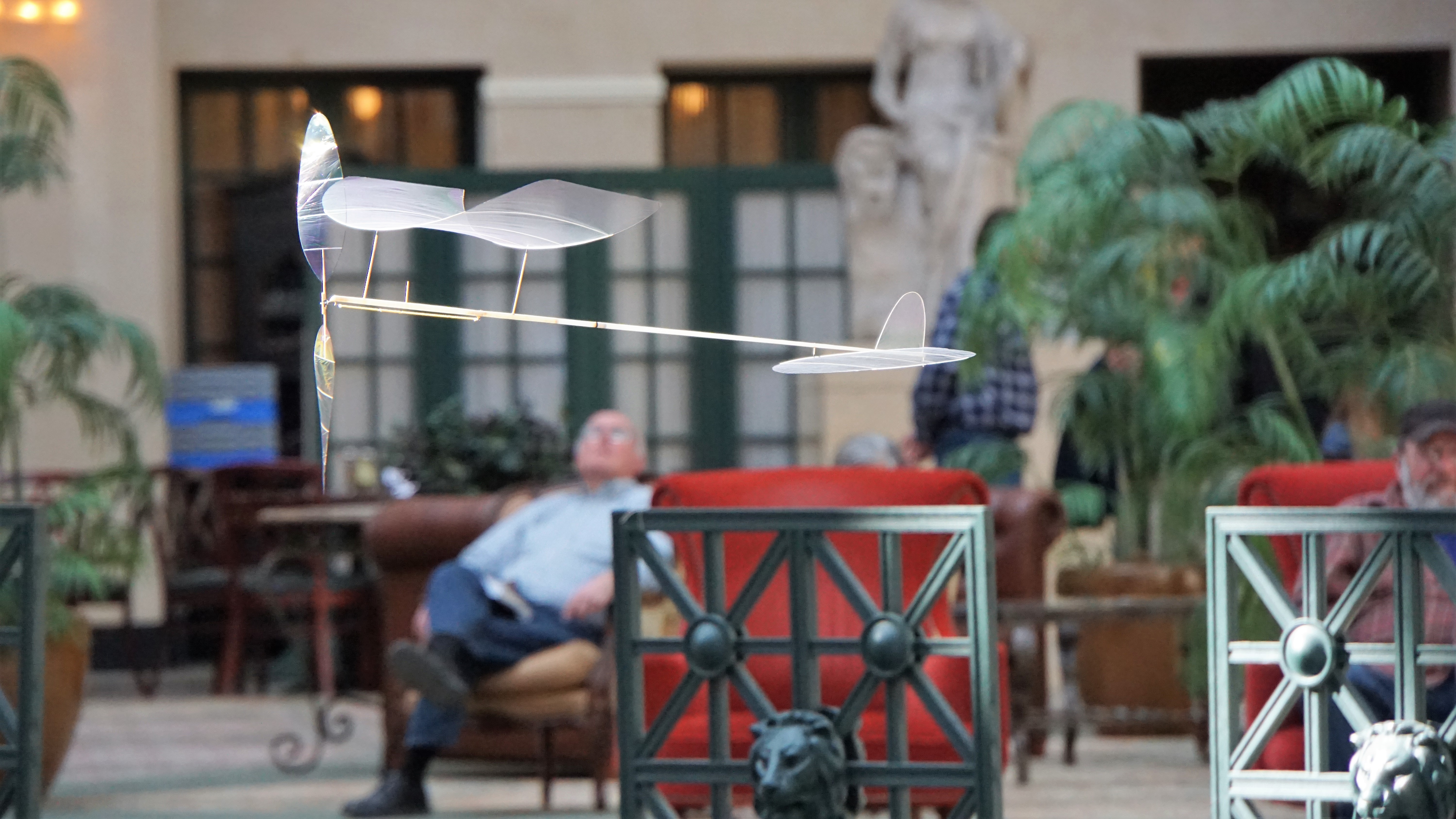
F1D model in flight

The FAI is the international organising body for all air sports worldwide, including aeromodelling. The FAI sanctions World and European Championships for the ultimate indoor duration class designated F1D. F1D models must have a minimum weight of 1.4 grams and a maximum wing span of 55 cm. These models are constructed from light balsa sheet and strip, boron filament, carbon fibre, and a transparent covering of plastic film less than 0.5 micrometres thick. The models are powered by 0.4 grams of rubber in a single loop about 9.0 inches long that can be wound to take around 1500 turns. The average propeller RPM during a flight is less than 50 and these models fly at less than walking pace. F1D models require a large space, such as a sports hall, aircraft or dirigible hangar, with the famous atrium of the West Baden Springs Hotel having been previously used for indoor free flight competitions in the United States, and there is even a salt mine in Romania 400 feet (120 m) underground that has hosted the FAI world F1D championships several times. Single flight times approach forty minutes.

Although most other indoor model aircraft are also rubber-powered, gliders and aircraft powered by compressed gas or electric batteries are also flown indoors. Some classes concentrate on scale or semi-scale replicas of man-carrying aircraft. Others feature unusual flight configurations, such as ornithopters, helicopters or autogyros.

Indoor modelling is now about a century old. A history of indoor models may be found here.

== Old Timers ==
Sanctioned in the United States by the Society of Antique Modelers , and by a growing number of "SAM" organization chapters around the world (as well as similar national clubs in some nations) so-called "Old Timer" free flight model aircraft, which can be gliders, rubber powered or engine powered models, are flyable reproductions of free flight model aircraft designs that generally originated from anywhere in the world, any time before the US involvement in World War II began in 1941–42. Scaling of the size (enlargement or reduction) of these designs are permitted for most of the event types in SAM competition, with a few specialized categories existing for reproduction models that mandate the models be built in their original size only.

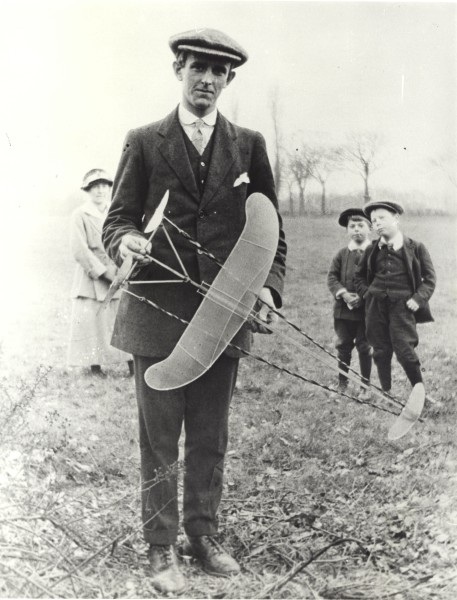
Hawker Hurricane designer Sydney Camm as a young man, with a "twin-pusher" free flight model, circa 1915 in England, a type flown today in "old-timer" meets

In the United Kingdom, models built to plans or kits published before January 1951 are categorised as vintage and those subsequently but prior to 1960 are categorised as classic. Jim Arnott holds Winding Boy, a classic rubber model designed by Urlan Wannop.

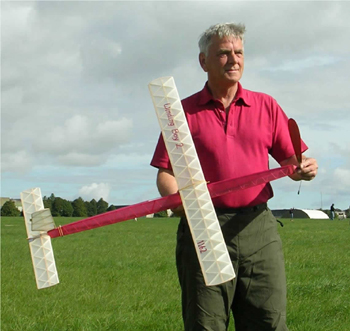
Jim Arnott with Winding Boy

Low-pressure, enjoyable competitions for these models generally follow the modern competition formats, with special categories for these early-design models that re-create the model aircraft events actually held before WWII, and even the "old-timer" movement has seriously begun to embrace electric-powered versions of designs originally built for the two-stroke gasoline-fueled engines of pre-WWII free flight aeromodelling. Actual pre-WW II vintage gasoline-fueled model engines, or authentically operational reproductions of them, are even used on some of the engine-powered designs, and a substantial interest exists in so-called "RC Assist" old timer free flight models within the SAM organization, which takes the engine powered designs of that era, powers them with more modern two and four stroke glow engines or brushless electric motors instead, and adds rudder, elevator and engine control from a radio control transmitter, just as would be done in the regular RC hobby.

Old Timer free flight aircraft specifications, competition rules and guidelines are available from the SAM organization online.

== Scale rubber ==
Rubber scale models replicate full-scale aircraft. Scale documentation is used at contests to check the accuracy and compliance of the model to the full-scale aircraft modeled.

Most rubber scale models are in the 20” to 30” wingspan range. Exceptions are for "Peanut Scale" class models, with a maximum 13” wingspan and "Jumbo Scale" class models, with 36” or greater wingspan. The models are powered with loops of rubber matched to the weight of the model and the diameter and pitch of the propeller. The length of the loops often exceed twice the length of the fuselage of the model. The flying duration of the scale model is greatly increased because of the number of windings that can be made on such a long loop of rubber with multiple strands. A mechanical winder is used and the rubber is stretched up to fives times original length to pack in maximum winds on the motor. In flight, these models look just like the real thing. All that is missing is the noise of the engine in the original airplane. Experts can achieve spectacular flights from obscure designs such as the Wright brothers original and Bleriot's channel crosser, to one-of-a-kind Depression era homebuilts and modern day experimental aircraft.
