= Glow plug (model engine) =

Type of internal combustion engine

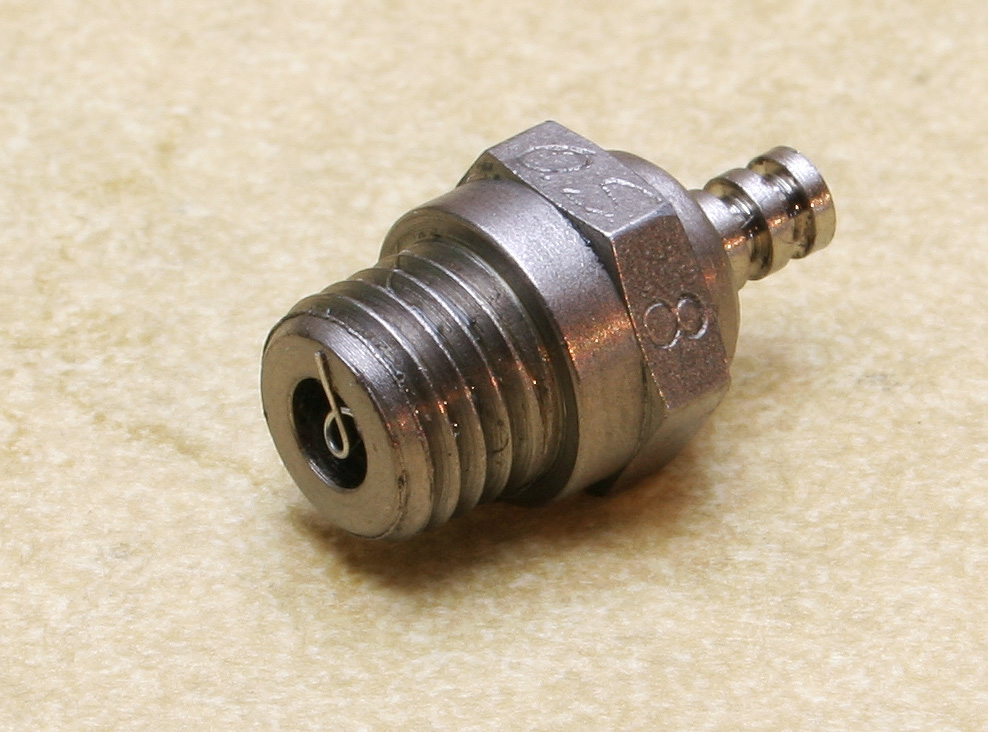
Standard non idle-bar glowplug of a model aeroplane engine, where the end of the platinum-content helical ignition element can be seen

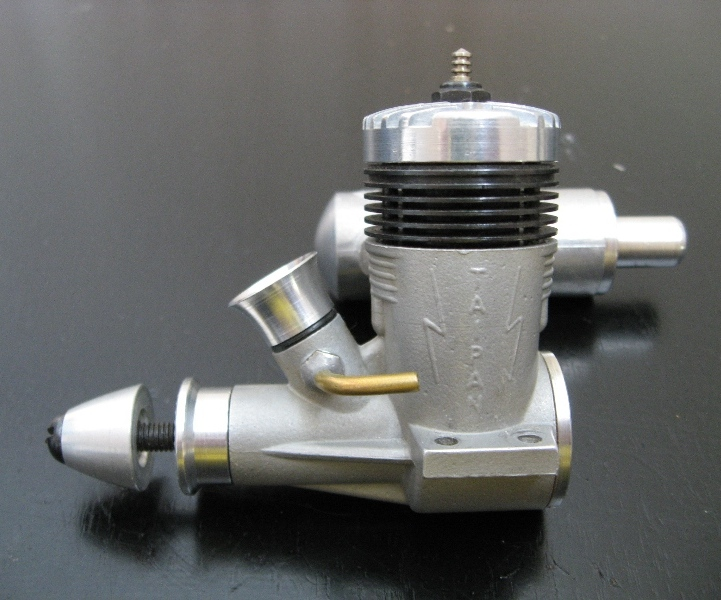
Glowplug model aeroplane engine, with the plug visible atop the cylinder

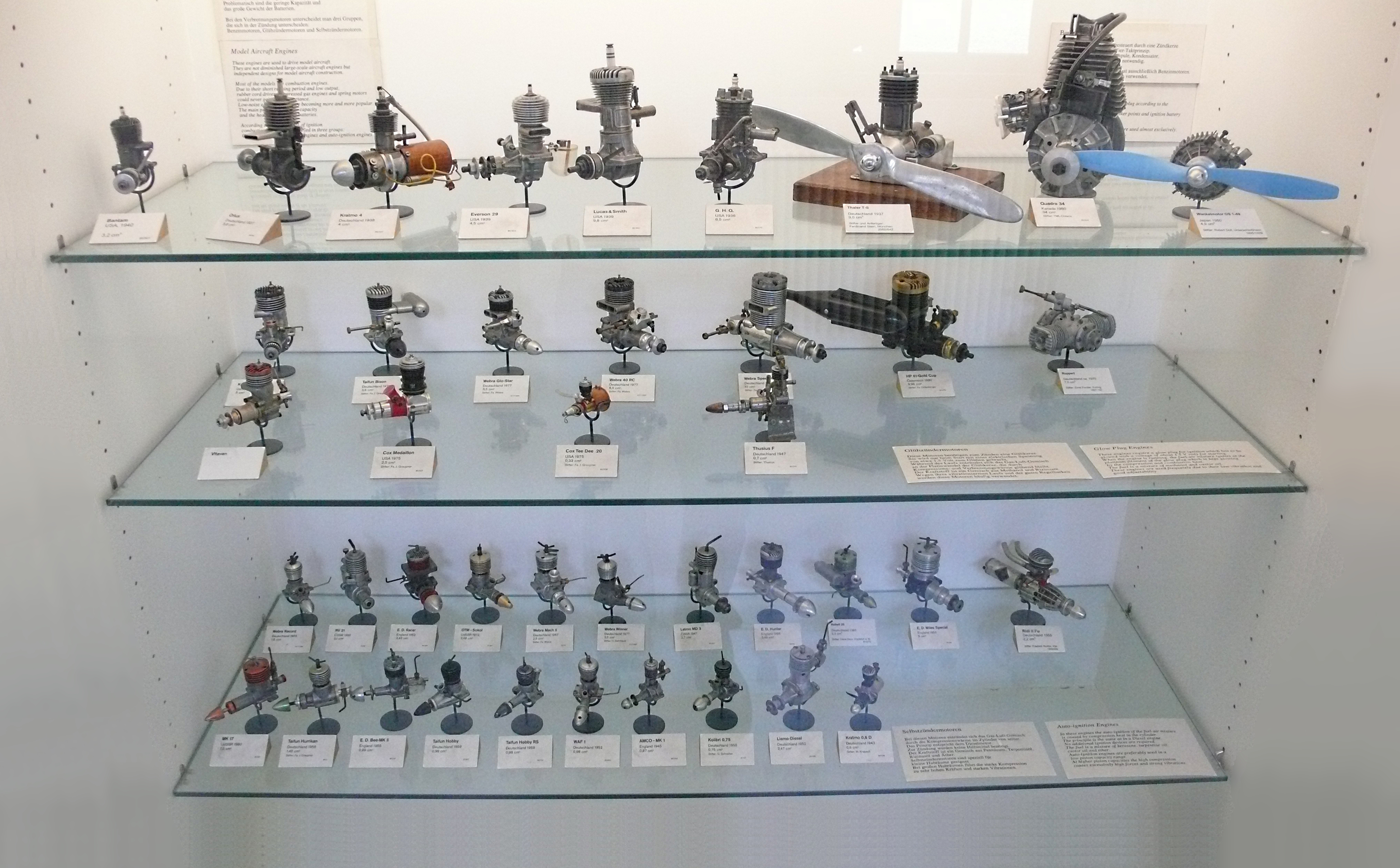
A display of vintage and modern model aircraft engines, of both spark ignition and glow plug ignition types

A glow plug engine, or glow engine, is a type of small internal combustion engine typically used in model aircraft, model cars and similar applications. The ignition is accomplished by a combination of heating from compression, heating from a glow plug and the catalytic effect of the platinum within the glow plug on the methanol within the fuel.

== History ==
German inventor Ray Arden invented the first glow plug for model engines in 1947.

== Model glow plug design ==
The glow plugs used in model engines are significantly different from those used in full-size diesel engines. In full-size engines, the glow plug is used only for starting. In model engines, the glow plug is an integral part of the ignition system because of the catalytic effect of the platinum wire. The glow plug is a durable, mostly platinum, helical wire filament recessed into the plug's tip. When an electric current runs through the plug, or when exposed to the heat of the combustion chamber, the filament glows, enabling it to help ignite the special fuel used by these engines. Power can be applied using a special connector attaching to the outside of the engine, and may use a rechargeable battery or DC power source.

There are three types/shapes (at least) of glow plugs. The standard glow plug, which comes in long/standard and short (for smaller engines), in both open and idle-bar configurations, has a threaded tube that penetrates the combustion chamber to varying degrees. Due to the small size of the combustion chamber changing brands or styles of standard glow plug can affect the compression ratio. Turbo style (European/metric) and Nelson style (North American/English) glow plugs do not penetrate the combustion chamber. Instead they have an angled shoulder that seals against a matching surface at the bottom of the glow plug hole. As a Turbo or Nelson plug is installed and seals the combustion chamber, they create a smooth surface inside the head. This smooth surface is very desirable for high-performance application such as Control Line Speed events and also high-revving RC Cars. The design of Turbo/Nelson plugs allow switching between brands without the possibility of affecting compression. Turbo and Nelson plugs are not interchangeable as they have different threads and dimensions.

== Fuel ==
Glow fuel generally consists of methanol with varying degrees of nitromethane content as an oxidizer for greater power, generally between 5% and 30% of the total blend. These volatiles are suspended in a base oil of castor oil, synthetic oil or a blend of both for lubrication and heat control. The lubrication system is a "total loss" type, meaning that the oil is expelled from the exhaust after circulating through the engine. The fuel ignites when it comes in contact with the heating element of the glow plug. Between strokes of the engine, the wire remains hot, continuing to glow partly due to thermal inertia, but largely due to the catalytic combustion reaction of methanol remaining on the platinum filament. This keeps the filament hot, allowing it to ignite the next charge, thus sustaining the power cycle.

Some aircraft engines are designed to run on fuel with no nitromethane content whatsoever. Glow fuel of this type is referred to as "FAI fuel" after the aeronautical governing body of the same name, which requires such fuel in some competitions.

== Starting ==
To start a glow engine, a direct current of around 3 amps and 1.5 volts is applied to the plug from a "glow plug igniter" or "glow driver", powered by a high current single cell rechargeable battery, or a purpose-built "power panel" running on a 12VDC source. The current heats the platinum filament, causing it to glow red hot, hence the name. The engine is then spun from the outside using a manual crank, built-in rope-based recoil starter, spring-loaded motor or purpose-built electric motor, or by hand, to introduce fuel to the chamber. Once the fuel has ignited and the engine is running, the electrical connection is no longer needed and can be removed. Each combustion keeps the glow plug filament hot, which along with the catalysis of methanol oxidation by the platinum, allows the ignition of the next charge in a self-sustaining power cycle.

The rechargeable battery may be of NiMH, NiCD, Li-ion, or lead-acid type. The higher fully-charged voltages of lead-acid (2.0) and Li-ion (4.2) cells, if applied directly to a regular 1.5 volt glow plug, will cause it to burn out instantaneously, so either a resistor of the proper value and wattage, or a high-power germanium transistor's base/emitter junction (in a series connection with one of the plug's terminals) can be used to limit the current through the plug to an appropriate level. Even with an appropriate power input, glow plugs can burn out at any time, and hobbyists are encouraged to carry spares.

Technically a glow plug engine is fairly similar to a diesel engine and hot bulb engine in that it uses internal heat to ignite the fuel, but since the ignition timing is not controlled by fuel injection (as in an ordinary diesel engine), or electrically (as in a spark ignition engine), it must be adjusted by changing fuel/air mixture and plug/coil design (usually through adjusting various inlets and controls on the engine itself.) A richer mixture will tend to cool the filament and so retard ignition, slowing the engine. A leaner mixture produces more power, but the engine is less well lubricated, which can cause overheating and detonation. This "configuration" can also be adjusted by using varying plug designs for a more exact thermal control. Of all internal combustion engine types, the glow plug engine most resembles the hot bulb engine, since on both types the ignition occurs due to a "hot spot" within the engine combustion chamber.

Glow plug engines can be designed for two-cycle operation (ignition every rotation) or four-cycle operation (ignition every two rotations). The two-cycle (or two-stroke) version produces more power, but the four-cycle engines have more low-end torque, are less noisy and have a lower-pitched, more realistic sound.

== Considerations when using glow plugs ==
A glow plug engine must be operated with the correct glow plug temperature. Large engines can operate with lower temperatures, while smaller engines radiate heat to the air more quickly and require a hotter glow plug to maintain the correct temperature for ignition. The ambient temperature also dictates the best glow plug temperature; in cold weather, hotter plugs are needed. Since glow plug engines are air-cooled, an engine that "runs hot" can sometimes benefit from a lower plug temperature, although this may cause rougher idling and difficulty in tuning. The operating speed of the engine must also be considered; if the engine is to run at consistently high RPM, such as with an airplane or a car on a mostly straight track, a lower plug temperature is more efficient. If the engine is to operate at lower RPM, combustion will not heat the engine as much, and a hotter plug is required.

The fuel type and the fuel/air mixture must also be considered. The greater the nitromethane content in the fuel, the hotter the fuel will burn; high "nitro" fuels require cooler glow plugs. Lean mixtures (low fuel-to-air ratio) burn hotter than rich mixtures (higher fuel-to-air ratio) and operating temperatures can be raised to levels that can prematurely destroy the glow plug if too lean a mixture is used ("over-leaning").

If the engine slows down ("sags") when the battery power is removed, the plug temperature or the nitromethane content of the fuel should be increased, as the engine is not sufficiently hot. If the engine backfires when it is hand-cranked, it is operating too hot and the glow plug temperature or "nitro" content should be lowered.

Glow plugs have a limited lifetime and users are advised to have several replacement plugs on hand. Replacement plugs must be the correct type; plugs for turbo engines are not compatible with plugs for standard engines. The plugs should be tightened a quarter-turn past a snug fit to avoid over-tightening. Glow plugs, like all incandescent objects, are extremely hot, and glow plugs should never be removed when hot. Likewise, care must be taken when fueling because a hot glow plug can ignite fuel. Overheating of the battery can also be dangerous and only well-made connectors should be used.

== Technical specifications ==
Turbo Glow Plug

- Overall Length: 17 mm (0.67 in)
- Diameter: 0.35 in (8.9 mm)
- Thread size: M8x.75mm

Normal Glow Plug

- Length: .8"
- Diameter: 6.35mm
- Threads: 1/4-32 UNEF (most often used thread specification for model engines)

== See also ==
- Nitro engine
