= Cox model engine =

Model engine

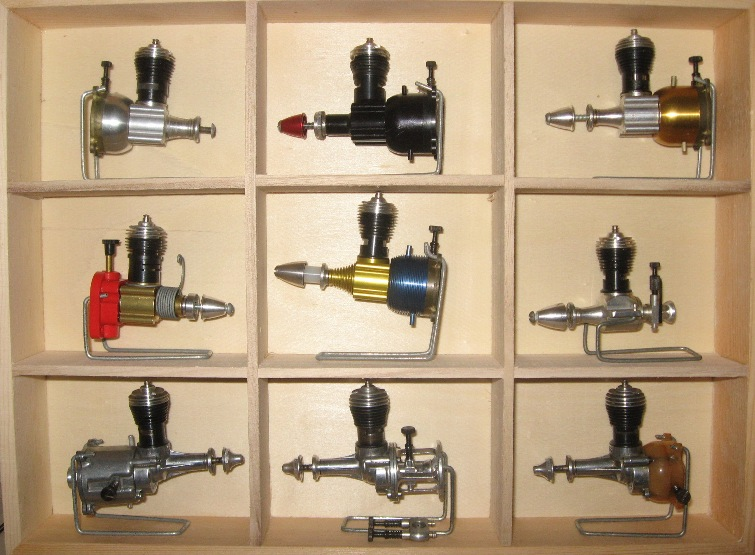
Cox Model Engines

Cox Fokker DVII Ready To Fly Control Line Model Plane

1/2A model airplanes

Cox model engines are used to power small model airplanes, model cars and model boats. They were in production for more than 60 years between 1945 and 2006. The business is named for founder Leroy M. Cox. He started L.M. Cox Manufacturing Co. Inc, which later became Cox Hobbies Inc., then Cox Products, before being sold to Estes Industries, when it became Cox Models. On February 7, 2009, Estes Industries stopped producing Cox engines and sold all of their remaining inventory – mainly spare parts – to several private buyers from Canada and the US. One of the new owners of the remaining Cox engine and parts inventory has launched a website with an online store. After the bankruptcy of Hobbico in 2019, MECOA (Model Engine Corp of America) purchased Cox Hobbies in its entirety from Estes Corporation.

Millions of engines were produced. They became the most common 1/2A Class 0.049 cubic inch engine in the world, and probably still are today. Although the production of the engines ceased some years ago, engines made as far back as the 1950s are still sold "as new" and are in abundance on eBay worldwide.

== Cox history ==
The Cox range of model engines were the brainchild of entrepreneur Leroy (Roy) M. Cox.

- Cox Manufacturing started out in Cox's garage in 1945 where he made wooden popguns for kids and employed local housewives to assemble them. Metal was scarce due to the war which is why the toys were made of wood.
- In 1946 metal became readily available again and competitors quickly moved into the market, making their metal popguns cheaper, so Cox moved to something else, making metal tether cars for kids.
- In August 1946 a fire in Cox's garage forced him to move to newer and larger premises at 730 Poinsettia Avenue, Santa Ana, California.
- In 1947 Cox developed a racing car which used an engine manufactured by Cameron Brothers. The cars sold for $19.95 and generated $200,000 in sales in their first year of production.
- In 1949 Cox developed their own engine for their racing tether car which included some parts from Mel Anderson's Spitzy engine. This engine was called the "O Forty Five" as it was .045 cubic inch displacement.
- In 1950 with sales of the car proving to be a success Cox moved on to development of a model plane engine. Cox felt the need for dependable, easy-to-start engines and spent eight months of 1950 in research. His three-man engineering crew (himself, Mark Mier and Bill Fogler) spent seven days a week, day and night, developing the .049 Space Bug contest engine. The result was the Space Bug .049 Contest engine, Cox's first model plane engine which was completed in October 1951.
- In 1952 the first name change was made to L.M. Cox Manufacturing Company Inc. The Space Bug engine set the scene for all the Cox engines that followed, and went into full production in 1952. This engine was so popular that it caused problems for other model engine manufacturers.
- In 1953 Cox produced their first ready to fly (RTF) airplane, the TD1, which was powered by the Space Bug engine.
- In 1953 L.M. Cox Manufacturing was sued by Jim Walker (American Junior Aircraft Co.) for copyright infringement because Cox was using Walker's patented bellcrank system in the TD1 and because Walker believed the Cox Skylon Reel was a copy of his U-Reely control handle. The court case lasted for three years.
- In 1955 Cox won the court case against Walker. Walker's patent on the bellcrank control system was ruled void and invalid because it was determined that the system had been designed before Walker's patent and by someone else - a man named Oba St. Clair, who was the first man to fly a control line airplane (in the US) back in 1937 and the design was published in 1938. St. Clair had shown his design to Walker, who took it upon himself to patent the design. The court also ruled that the Cox reel was not a copyright infringement.
- In 1956 Cox developed the Babe Bee 049, designed by William (Bill) Selzer, which had an extruded aluminum crankcase, not cast like the others. This engine sold for just $3.95 and was the final nail in the coffin of many competitors whose engines were selling for substantially more. The Babe Bee was a high quality high precision engine that started easily and was very reliable, unlike some of the competition.
- In 1957 Cox took over the Flying Circle at Disneyland, which was a major coup for the company. The model planes were flown each day in front of tens of thousands of people and they had a hobby shop right there full of Cox RTF planes. The Cox Flying Circle remained in operation until 1965 when it was closed to make way for expansion of Tomorrowland.
- In 1960 Cox hired an engineer named Bill Atwood (who had already built his own line of engines), to develop a new .010 cubic inch engine. Atwood was also responsible for the Tee Dee and Medallion line of engines. These engines put Cox on the map as a leading engine in the world for many years to come.
- In 1963, due to continuing growth, the company moved to larger (225,000 square feet) facilities which were three times larger than the old site. Shortly thereafter Cox got into slot cars and focused attention on gearing up for this fad.
- In 1965 Cox International was established in Hong Kong to meet the demands of the slot car craze.
- In 1967 the slot car fad ended, leaving Cox with excess stock that couldn't be sold, resulting in cash flow problems.
- In 1969 Cox's wife Myrtle died and he had health problems of his own, so he retired and sold the company to Leisure Dynamics Inc. Leisure Dynamics continued to expand the range of Cox model aircraft as well as adding trains, boats, rockets, kites and radio control, boosting sales to 25 million dollars per year. Cox retired with the distinction of being the world's most successful model engine manufacturer.
- In 1970 William H. Selzer was appointed as President of L.M. Cox Manufacturing Inc. (a subsidiary of Leisure Dynamics).
- In 1971 Leisure Dynamics broke the company in two, moved the model production to Minnesota, and left the engine production in Santa Ana, California.
- In 1976 Leisure Dynamics changed the company name to "Cox Hobbies Inc."
- In 1980 Leisure Dynamics filed for bankruptcy, taking Cox Hobbies Inc. with them.
- In 1981 Leroy Cox died on September 22, at age 75.
- In 1983 former Cox engineer and president Bill Selzer (whom Cox had hired in 1952) purchased the company out of bankruptcy. All manufacturing was returned to Santa Ana. The company once again flourished into the 1990s, with new products being added and another move to even bigger facilities.
- In 1990 Cox Hobbies moved to new facilities at Corona, California.
- In 1993 the company name was changed again to "Cox Products". The Pee Wee, Babe Bee, and PT 19 Trainer were still in production.
- In 1995 Cox celebrated 50 years and introduced some new engines and RTF models.
- In 1996 Cox was sold to Estes Industries / Centuri Corp. and moved to Penrose, Colorado. Things changed considerably from then. Cox, as the hobbyists of the world knew it, was gone. The high reputation Cox engines had declined. One by one each product item was withdrawn from sale as stock ran out. Parts from different engines were mixed and matched, making hybrid engines that performed very poorly compared to the Cox engines from previous years. Estes added new products to the Cox line using the Cox name, but these were electric radio control models. Some of these were known to explode, resulting in a massive product recall by the company.
- In 2005 an online company calling themselves Cox Hobby Distributors (owned by Estes Industries) appeared selling RC and electric products and some of the "classic" engines and RTF models. However, as each item from the classic era sold out it wasn't replaced.
- In February 2009, Estes Industries sold all of their remaining classic Cox stock to several private buyers, one of them being a small company from Canada. In June 2009 they launched a website to sell their remaining stock online and also via eBay.
- In January 2010 Estes-Cox Corporation was purchased by Hobbico, based in Champaign, Illinois.
- In 2011 Cox International continued to revive the classic Cox brand as well as introducing new engine versions, spare parts and accessories.
- After the bankruptcy of Hobbico in 2019, MECOA (Model Engine Corp of America) purchased Cox Hobbies in its entirety from Estes Corporation. All molds, machinery, inventory, tooling, and drawings were moved from Penrose, Colorado to MECOA's Irwindale, California facility over the next two years during the COVID outbreak. MECOA had been producing OEM parts for Estes-Cox since the mid 1990's and was negotiating to buy COX from them in 2009, but Hobbico bought both Estes and Cox around the same time. MECOA now owns the COX Registered Trademark

== The engines ==
Cox .049 Engine Specifications
- (All Cox .049 Engines)
- Bore: 0.406 inches (10.3 mm)
- Stroke: 0.386 inches (9.8 mm)
- Displacement: 0.04997 cubic inches (0.8189 cc)
- Bore/Stroke Ratio: 1.05:1 (Oversquare)

Cox .051 Engine Specifications
- Bore: 0.410 inches (10.4 mm)
- Stroke: 0.386 inches (9.8 mm)
- Displacement: 0.0509 cubic inches (0.8341 cc)
- Bore/Stroke Ratio: 1.06:1 (Oversquare)

The Cox .049 Engine is a 2-stroke internal combustion glow plug engine. These engines use an electrically heated glow plug to ignite the fuel/air within the cylinder on start-up. Once running the battery is disconnected and ignition is similar to a diesel engine. The self ignition is due to the heat produced from the compression of the air/fuel mix, and the catalytic reaction between the platinum element in the glow plug and the methanol in the fuel. Fuel intake to the engine is controlled by a simple needle valve and venturi system. Fuel/air mixture intake to the crankcase is controlled via a reed valve or rotary valve depending on the engine design.

In a reed valve engine, the valve is drawn open by suction as the piston moves upward on the compression stroke. As the piston moves down on the power stroke, the pressure in the crankcase causes the reed valve to close. The fuel-air mixture in the crankcase is then forced past the piston via the transfer/bypass ports in the cylinder. One characteristic of a reed valve is that the engine will run in either direction; an advantage for a "pusher" model but a disadvantage if the engine is finger started, as it may start in the wrong direction. (The Cox engines employed a starting spring which kept fingers free of the propeller and generally ensured correct rotational direction.)

On rotary valve engines, the process is similar except instead of a reed, a rotary valve is used (incorporated in the crankshaft), which opens and closes as the piston moves up and down. The rotary valve is more efficient and adjustable (at design time) as there is a larger and clearer path to the crankcase than in the reed valve setup, but such engines can run in only one direction; pusher configurations require a special propeller, sometimes difficult to find.

The fuel used to power the engine is called Model Engine Fuel, a mixture of methanol (70–40%), castor oil (20%) and nitromethane (10–40%).

The Cox line of reed valve engines designed prior to 1960 used a rear reed valve induction system. In the late 1950s Cox experimented with rear rotary valve induction (as used in the RR1) before moving forward with front rotary valve induction for their Tee Dee and Medallion lines .

=== Early engines ===
Cox Thimble Drome Space Bug

- 1949 O Forty Five Power Pak (Special Racer Car Engine #PP-45 - manufactured 1949)

This engine was the first designed by Cox but included some major parts (i.e. piston and cylinder) of the Spitzy .045 engine designed by Mel Anderson. It employed a twin reed valve which was later used for the Space Bug. The engine was a major engineering achievement for its time, by incorporating reduction gears, fuel tank, flywheel and muffler all into one "Power Pak." The air intake was via one of the axles.

- 1949 O Sixty Power Pak (Special Racer Car Engine #???? - manufactured 1949)

When slightly more power was needed for the Thimble Drome Special car to obtain more speed, a slightly larger version of the .045 was ordered with a bigger bore making the displacement .060 cubic inches.

- 1952 Space Bug (Cat#349 - manufactured 1952–1958)

The Space Bug was the first engine built entirely by Cox. It was designed for control line flying use only and was marketed as a "competition" engine and sold for $6.95. Back then there was no market for radio control, and free flight hadn't been considered by Cox at this time. The piston and cylinder were made from mild steel bar stock and the crankcase and fuel tank were cast aluminum.

- 1953 Thermal Hopper (Cat#360 - manufactured 1953–1958)

The Thermal Hopper is basically a Space Bug without the fuel tank. It has a needle valve and venturi mounted on an aluminum plate instead. These were designed for free flight and could also be used for control line flying. It allowed the user to put a fuel tank of their choosing on. The engine output was recorded at 0.066 bhp @ 17,000 rpm with a torque of 4.5 Oz.in at 10,000 rpm.

Cox Thimble Drome Thermal Hopper

- 1953 Space Bug Jnr. (Cat#370 - manufactured 1953–1958)

The Space Bug Junior is a Space Bug with a smaller plastic tank. This cheaper version also only had one intake bypass port and sold for $3.95.

- 1955 Strato Bug (Cat#380 - manufactured 1955)

Basically the same engine as a Space Bug but included a two-piece fuel tank which was cheaper to make than the original Space Bug tank. The tank itself is turned aluminum while the tank back is red, yellow or blue plastic from the Space Bug Junior but is modified to include an aluminum pick-up tube and a larger hole to expose the venturi that is integral to the aluminum tank. The later Babe Bee tank was simply a further developed version of this tank. This engine was only produced during 1955 and sold as a mid-range sport engine for $5.95. As such not many exist today which makes them very rare and collectible selling for over $300US in 2008 and $1000+ in 2012. Beware of fakes! Some unscrupulous sellers have been selling fake Strato Bugs that have a CNC machined tank and a Space Bug Junior back-plate.

=== Standard Bees ===
Cox Babe Bee (left); Golden Bee (right)

- 1956 Babe Bee 049 (Cat#350 - manufactured Nov 1956 – Jan 1996)

The classic Babe Bee was the first engine Cox produced with an extruded machined anodized bar stock aluminum crankcase. This crankcase was machine made and was much cheaper and faster to make than the cast aluminum crankcase of the earlier models. This engine was also supplied in thousands of RTF (Ready to Fly) airplanes sold in department stores worldwide. It has an integrated 5cc fuel tank. Max output power was recorded around 0.057 bhp (42 watts) @ 13,500 rpm on 15% nitro.

- 1957 Pee Wee .020 (Cat#100 - manufactured Feb 1957 – Jan 1996)

Buoyed with excitement from the Babe Bee 049, Cox wanted to make a half-size version of the Babe Bee. It was a Pee Wee .020, just like a Babe Bee but half the size.

- 1958 Golden Bee (Cat#120 - manufactured Oct 1957 – Jan 1980)

Custom built Golden Bee .051

The original Golden Bee was a Baby Bee that has a larger (8cc), stunt vented fuel tank and has been anodized gold. The larger tank allowed the planes to fly longer while the stunt vents allowed the airplanes to fly inverted without fuel running out or the engine cutting out. The first versions of the Golden Bee had a single bypass intake port and same size backplate venturi opening (0.0625") as the Babe Bee but later versions had a 0.082" venturi opening to 11/64" at the reed valve while the Babe Bee was 9/64". This was the secret to its slightly higher power output. The 1969 and later RC version with throttle sleeve had two bypass #1 cylinder making them slightly more powerful again to make up for power losses due to the exhaust throttle sleeve.

- 1966 QZ (Cat#450 - manufactured 1966–1996)

QZ stands for Quiet Zone. It is a Babe Bee with a muffler, twin bypass port cylinder with no sub piston induction and a high compression (#1702) glow head. An attempt to regain the power loss caused by the muffler. Very similar to the later QRC engine which reportedly worked better. Cox also sold the muffler, cylinder and high comp. glow head components of the QZ as a Muffler Conversion Kit (Cat#495) for $2.98.

- 1976 QRC (Cat#450-1 - manufactured 1976–1996)

The QRC was a modified Babe Bee engine that had a muffler and larger (8cc) fuel tank. In the 1970s noise became an issue and the Cox engineers discovered that when adding a muffler the engine would lose significant power. This problem was alleviated by installing a cylinder with no sub piston induction. The engine was designed for power launching Radio Controlled Gliders and had a red tank with a blue spinner.

- 1976 RC Bee (Cat#360 - manufactured 1976–1996)

This engine was designed for small radio-controlled model planes. It has a plastic clunk tank and an unusual cast crankcase. The Leisure Dynamics team thought that cast crankcases would be cheaper to produce, however, they discovered that there were many manufacturing defects and they were difficult to machine, resulting in a high failure rate, so they returned to the tried and proven machined aluminum bar stock crankcase.

- 1982 Dragon Fly (Cat#4505 - Manufactured 1982–1996)

This engine was designed for the radio controlled model planes. It is basically a Baby Bee with a clunk tank, two large transfer ports and a muffler throttle.

- 1989 Texaco (Cat#4506 - manufactured 1989–1996)

The engine was designed for the 1/2A Texaco RC duration competition. The engine has an additional fin on the larger glow plug which dissipates heat better allowing the engine to swing a larger propeller. i.e. 7 or 8 inches. This engine has a red 8cc fuel tank and a black crankcase. Original 1989 engines did not come out with 5 fin glow plug. The 5-fin glow plug came later in the 1992 Catalog. This engine also has the smaller 0.062" venturi opening of the Babe-bee to provide a longer engine run.

- 1995 Texaco Jnr (Cat#4507 - manufactured 1995–1996)

The same engine as the Texaco above except that it has a smaller 5cc fuel tank which is also red. First appeared in 1995 Cox Catalog.

=== High-performance Bees ===
- 1956 RR1 (Cat#390 - manufactured 1956–1965)

The rare Cox RR1

The RR1 uses a rear rotary valve intake rather than a reed valve in an attempt to achieve more power. The engine came after the Babe Bee and looks very similar with its anodized, machined extruded aluminum crank case and fuel tank. The power improvement was negligible, so Cox reverted to the cheaper easier to build Babe Bee. The engine was made for quite a few years and sold for $6.95. A left- and right-hand rotary valve were made, as were left-hand 6×2 glass-filled nylon props for the RR-1. Some versions have a blue tank, others have a clear anodized tank. There were two versions of the tank back as well, to fit the corresponding tank. It has become a collector's item due to its uniqueness and colors and is worth around $300 in 2008.

- 1959 Space Hopper (Cat#150 - manufactured Nov 1958–1961)

The Space Hopper was Cox's first attempt at a beam mount high performance reed valve engine plus the first steps towards their greatest engine, the Tee Dee series. The engine was basically like the Thermal Hopper was to a Space Bug. That is a Babe Bee without a tank, but a venturi and needle valve relying on an external fuel tank. The engine looks similar to the Sportsman engine with a machined aluminum crankcase and rear induction via a reed valve with the needle valve assembly and venturi similar in appearance to the later Tee Dee series. This engine was short lived and made way for the Tee Dee in 1960. Due to their similarities to the Tee Dee that followed some of the parts crossed over from this engine to the Tee Dee. They look very retro and due to their apparent rareness are worth around 200 US dollars in 2008.

- 1973 Black Widow (Cat#150 - manufactured May 1973 – Jan 1996)

During the 70s a couple of Cox engineers were playing around with different colored Babe Bee and Golden Bee parts and came up with an all-black engine with a red spinner. They hopped it up a bit with a dual bypass cylinder from a Super Bee (#1), a black Golden Bee tank and a slightly larger (0.082") venturi intake. The Black Widow was born. These engines were marketed as a High Powered Combat Engine. On later Black Widows the red rubber spinner was replaced by a red anodized aluminum Tee Dee style spinner. In the late 1990s some Black Widows were produced with the a dual bypass slit exhaust cylinder. The slit exhaust was to prevent fires. According to an Aeromodeller engine test done in August 1974 the Black Widow on 25% Nitro output power was 0.08 bhp (60 watts) at 15,000 rpm with a max. torque of 6 oz.in at 9,000 rpm.

- 1995 Killer Bee 049 (Cat#340 - manufactured 1995–1996)

The Killer Bee was an attempt at making a fast reed valve 049 engine from information that had been learned over the years of racing and competition. It had a tapered cylinder with SPI and lighter piston similar to the Tee Dee, a stronger balanced crankshaft and a new reed valve shape. They had a Yellow plastic needle valve. Later in 2002 Estes produced a Killer Bee that had none of these features but looked like the original Killer Bee except for the needle valve. Beware of fakes! Some unscrupulous people are producing fakes and selling them. Check to make sure the engine is the "real deal" before purchasing.

- 1996 Killer Bee 051 (Cat#360 - manufactured 1996)

The Killer Bee 051 existed so that modelers could fly the same plane in two competition classes (i.e. A and 1/2A) simply by changing the engine. This engine has exactly the same performance as the 049. There is a legend that two thin lines (or grooves) in the piston skirt are for positive identification but this is incorrect. The grooves were intentionally designed to bleed off just enough power so that the 4% increase in displacement does not necessitate trim changes to a free flight model when switching the model from an 049 to the 051 to fly in the higher "A" class. The benefit of the grooves as a visual identifier was accidental.

- 1996 Venom (Cat#140 - manufactured 1996)

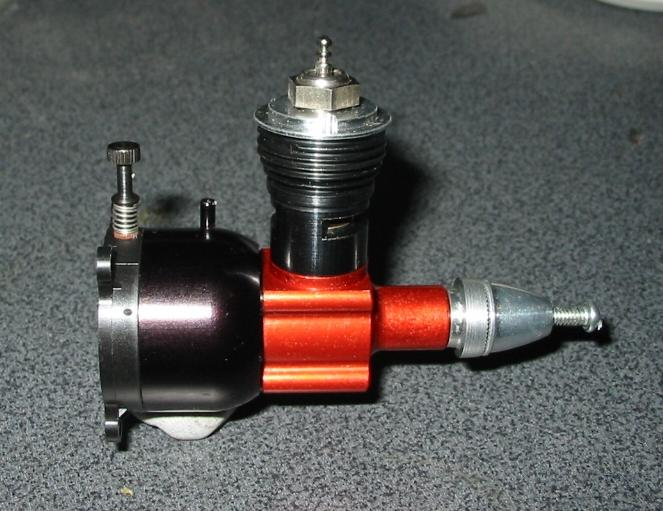
Cox Venom with Galbreath/Nelson Head

The Venom was Cox's last attempt at making a really fast 049 mouse racing engine. Again taken from ideas learned from years of competition, this engine put all those ideas into an off the shelf product. It used the Killer Bee crankshaft loosely fitted into the crankcase, and a cylinder with porting very similar Tee Dee cylinder and tapered like the Tee Dee and with a lightened piston like the Tee Dee. The rest of it was like a Black Widow. The problem was that the production engine was not the same as the prototype. A mistake had been made in manufacturing and the piston was lightened too much. This made the engine fast but the piston weak and they would blow the top off the piston after a few runs at high speed. As such only 1000 were made and they never bothered to make any more. Because of the defect and apparent counterfeits in the market, these engines fetch low prices.

=== Tee Dees ===
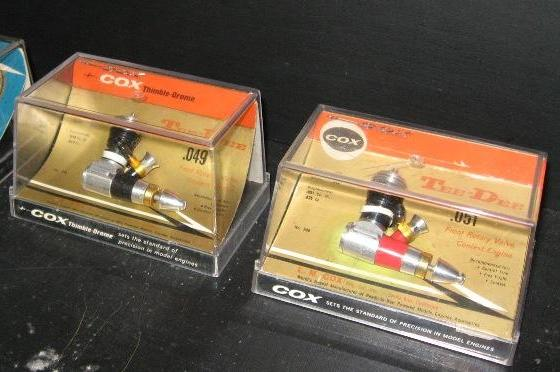
The famous Cox Tee Dee .049 and .051

- 1961 Tee Dee 049 (Cat#170 - manufactured Nov 1960 – Jan 1996)

The Tee Dee is Cox's most famous engine. This engine was dominant in competition for many years. It was designed by Bill Atwood who had been hired by Cox specifically to produce the Tee Dee line of competition engines. The important features of the Tee Dee are as follows:

- Tapered cylinder and a lightened and tapered piston
  - Result: tighter piston fit at TDC and less piston mass.
- Two deep bypass ports with two bypass booster grooves, known as "side flutes" on each bypass port, extending slightly above the main bypass groove
  - Result: significantly better air-fuel mixture induction
- True peripheral venturi
  - Result: more efficient fuel intake, fuel draw and induction
- Precision balanced and milled crankshaft
  - Result: better fuel intake, better balanced engine

The Tee Dee was tested by Aeromodeller Magazine in 1962 and the output power was recorded to be .105 bhp (78 watts) @ 22,000 rpm with a max torque of 5.5 oz.in. at 18,000 rpm on 25% Nitro. (Note: The modern Norvel AME 049 engine which has an aluminum piston running in a ceramic coated cylinder, outputs .14 bhp (100 watts)@ 20,000 rpm). In 1973 the bypass porting, crank shaft timing and venturi were modified slightly and a mesh screen was added to the venturi to keep out dirt. This resulted in a minor performance improvement over the earlier versions.

A hopped up Cox Tee Dee .051

- 1961 Tee Dee 051 (Cat#200 - manufactured Oct 1961 – Jan 1996)

The 051 was simply a Class A version of the engine, physically the same on the outside only the bore was different and the piston had a small groove in the skirt to bleed off just enough power to exactly equal an 049 so no trim changes would be required to free flight models (this groove also visually differentiates the 051 from the 049 but this was of secondary importance). The 051 also had a RED carb body.

- 1994 Tee Dee .05 RC (Cat#201 - manufactured 1994)

This engine had a proper RC carby and a full sized standard muffler and was designed specifically for RC flying. It had no Sub Piston Induction. Only two production runs of 1000 each were done so there are only 2000 of these in existence, making them the second rarest production engine next to the Venom. Note: Although the box said Tee Dee .05 the engine is actually .051

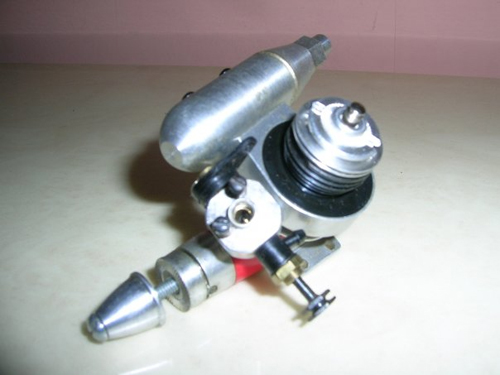
A Cox Tee Dee .05 RC

An .09 RC version also exists (Cat# 211 - manufactured 1994 also).

- 1961 Tee Dee .010, .020, .09 & .15

Cox also built Tee Dee's in .010 (Cat#130), .020 (Cat#160), .09 (Cat#210) and .15 (Cat#180) size. All these engines were very successful. One of the things Cox wanted Atwood to do was make him a .010 engine. Cox had already tried to halve the size of the Pee Wee .020 but couldn't get it to run for some reason. The suspicion surrounded a problem with the tiny reed valve. Atwood found that the front rotary valve worked well on the .010 size hence the Tee Dee .010 was born.

- 1961 Tee Dee .15 (Cat#180 - manufactured 1961)

The original Tee Dee .15 was actually .1495 cu. in. or 2.45 c.c. displacement. It immediately became the engine to use in FAI FF with vastly higher performance than the Olympic, which had supplanted the European diesels used at the time. Fritz Schneeberger (Switzerland) won the FAI free flight world championships using a Tee Dee .15 in 1961. This engine produced 260W @ 17,000 rpm using 80/20 FAI fuel. They proved fragile however, particularly the thin-wall cylinder, and ball-and-socket connecting rod, and were replaced by beefed-up versions (as noted below).

- 1961 Special .15 (Cat# 260 - manufactured 1962–1964)

Second version of Tee Dee 15 is slightly larger bore with a displacement of 0.1525 cu. in. or 2.499 c.c. with thicker wall cylinder and gudgeon pin conrod instead of a ball socket. This engine produced 340W @ 18,000 rpm using 30% nitro

- 1964 Special .15 MkII (Cat# 270 - manufactured 1964–1968)

Third version of the Tee Dee .15 with a single exhaust port, Schnüerle port transfer system and gold anodized crankcase. It produces 280 Watts @ 19,000 rpm using 80/20 FAI fuel or 350W @ 19,000 rpm on 30% nitromethane

=== Medallions ===
- 1961 Medallion 049 (Cat#240 - manufactured Nov 1961 – Jan 1996)

Cox Medallion .049

Also known as the "Poor man's Tee Dee" these were similar to the Tee Dee in appearance but had cheaper parts on them, making them cheaper to buy. The cylinder was a non-tapered twin bypass with no boost ports (like the one used on the Black Widow), the crankshaft was drilled out rather than milled like the Tee Dee, and the carb body was a one-piece unit with a conventional needle valve and spray bar. These engines were marketed as a Sport / Stunt engine as they were much tamer and much less cantankerous than the Tee Dee. These are a great reliable easy to use little engine even today. They can be purchased for under $20US in 2008. R/C versions of this engine were also produced with exhaust throttle. i.e. 1968 Cat#240-1 and the 1988 Cat#2501 with muffler/throttle.

- 1961 Medallion .09 & .15

The Medallion engine was also produced in (Cat#230).09 and (Cat#220) .15 cubic inch size. There were also R/C versions of these i.e. Cat#230-1 Medallion .09 RC and Cat#220-1 Medallion .15 RC.

- 1995 Medallion 051 (manufactured 1995)

Cox Medallion .051

This particular .051 came about when a special order for 300 Medallions was placed on Cox by the National Free Flight Society in the USA. It was a gentleman's agreement done on a handshake and it nearly didn't happen when Cox was sold to Estes. But the determination of the NFFS resulted in the deal happening, however, Estes-Cox only came through with 258 engines. The NFFS engraved each engine with a serial number and kept a record of who purchased each engine. These are probably the rarest of all Cox Engines due to the small size of the production run. These engines have a unique piston and cylinder setup that occurs on no other Cox engine, before or after. The cylinder has a straight bore (0.41 inches), slit exhaust, no sub piston induction.

=== Product engines ===
These are all variations of the Baby Bee with different back-plates and other parts designed for different RTF aircraft, cars and boats. There were literally hundreds of different models with subtle differences. Listed below are just a few of the more common ones.

- 1959 Super Bee (Cat# 350-1)

Babe Bee with twin bypass cylinder to give more power for the P40 Warhawk RTF model. Early version had 'P40' stamped on the cylinder. It had a standard Babe Bee tank.

- 1964 Silver Bee (Cat# 350-6)

Similar to the Super Bee but it had a larger 8cc non-vented fuel tank. It did not have P40 stamped on the cylinder but it did have the twin bypass ports. This engine came with the Spitfire RTF airplane.

- 1961 Series 190-x Product Engine (Cat#190-x - manufactured 1961 to 1971)

Babe Bee type engine with "postage stamp" type Delrin backplate and brass needle valve instead of the integral Babe Bee fuel tank. Various shapes were used depending on the model they were fitted to. Each time they made a modification for a new model that was built a new Cat number was produced. (e.g. 190–8) Some had dual bypass port cylinders while others had single, it depended on the airplane. e.g. JU-87D Stuka, P-51 Bendix Racer, P-51 Mustang & Miss America models.

- 1972 Series 191-x Product Engine (Cat#191-x - manufactured 1972 to 1975)

Babe Bee type engine with "horseshoe" type Delrin backplate and brass needle valve. The horseshoe backplate had additional mounting holes drilled in the plate allowed fitting to after market and kit aircraft. Various shapes and colours were produced depending on the model they were fitted to. Some had dual bypass port cylinders while others had single, it depended on the airplane. e.g. Sopwith Camel, Fokker DVII, ME-109, Super Stunter, PT-19 Trainer and others produced in the mid 1970s.

- 1976 Series 192-x Product Engine (Cat#192-x - manufactured 1976 to 1978)

Similar in appearance to the 191 series engine, produced for the 1977 Wings series of air craft. i.e. Hustler, Mantis, F-15 Eagle and F-15 Falcon air planes.

- 1963 Series 290 / Spook Product Engine (Cat#290)

Came on a blister pack as a "Two Ninety" replacement engine. Basically a replacement 190 engine. An aluminum back plate was used for the "Spook" flying wing combat model kit engine (290-1).

- 2000 Surestart (Cat#191)

Another variation of the modern Babe Bee. These were pretty good because they have a choke tube attached to the grey plastic backplate. The choke tube makes the engine even easier to start. They were fitted to the very last RTFs (e.g. PT19 and Hyper Viper) before they went out of production.

=== Original equipment manufacturer (OEM) engines ===
Over the years some Cox model engines were sold to other companies for use in their products and sold under the other companies names. Examples of these companies were, Testor Corporation, Sanwa & Kyosho of Japan, Johannes Graupner of Germany, Jerobee Industries trading as JoMac Products, Lite Machine Corporation, Kenbrite Corp. Australia and Tissan Haifa in Israel. Of all of the above-mentioned companies, only Tissan Haifa assembled their own engines called the Banana .049. All the rest used motors manufactured by Cox themselves.

The 1989 Cox Banana .049 (Cat#250) engine looked like a standard product engine with plastic backplate. It also had a spring starter and red aluminum spinner, and the fuel intake tube was extended below the plastic backplate. Cox also supplied a specially printed "Banana .049" box insert to fit their standard box.

=== Other Cox engines ===
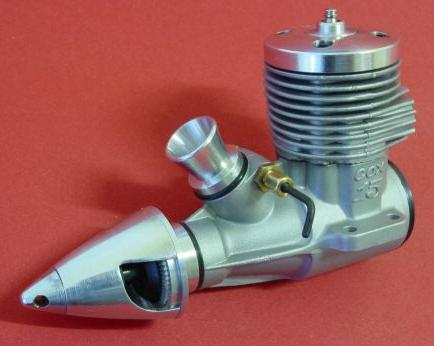
Cox Conquest 15 Free Flight/Control Line Engine

- 1959 Sportsman .15 (Cat# 110 - - manufactured 1958–1961)

Rear reed valve .15 sized version of the Space Hopper

- 1959 Olympic .15 (Cat# 140 manufactured 1959–1961)

Sportsman with twin ball races - designed for FAI Power FF event

- 1965 Olympic .15 Drum Valve

Prototyped only (50 made by Bill Atwood) They were handed out to various people to try out and as such a few still exist today and appear from time to time for sale at swap meets and on eBay.

- 1968 Concept II .35 Front Rotary R/C (Cat# 2500 1968)

Prototyped only - Bill Atwood - pictured in 1969 Dealer Catalog

- 1968 Concept II .35 Front Rotary Sport Engine (Cat# 2510 1968)

Prototyped only - Bill Atwood - pictured in 1969 Dealer Catalog

- 1968 Concept II .40 Front Rotary R/C (Cat# 2520 1968)

Prototyped only - Bill Atwood - pictured in 1969 Dealer Catalog

- 1968 Concept II .40 Rear Rotary R/C (Cat# 2530 1968)

Prototyped only - Bill Atwood - pictured in 1969 Dealer Catalog

- 1976 Cox Conquest .15 (Cat# 2800 - manufactured 1976–1978)

This engine took over from the Tee Dee .15 as "THE" Cox engine for FAI racing, combat and free flight for many more years until the Russian AAC Engines came along. This engine was patterned on the Australian designed 1973 Taipan 2.5cc Twin Ball Race engine by Gordon Burford. The entire top end of the Cox Conquest and the Taipan TBR are interchangeable. The Taipan TBR was based on the Rossi MkII so the top end is also interchangeable with a Rossi MkII. Also came in R/C version Cat# 2810. As a result of reorganization within Leisure Dynamics who owned Cox and K&B at the time, production of this engine was handed over to K&B and it became known as the K&B Cox Conquest after 1978. Production continued for a number of years when in 1990 the engine and rights were sold to MECOA owned by Randy Linsalato where it continued on as the RJL Cox Conquest for some time.

- 1976 Cox Conquest .40 - prototyped only

Samples do exist and the Conquest .40 was a grown up version of the Conquest .15 however due to reorganization with Leisure Dynamics who owned Cox and K&B at the time it was decided not to commence production as K&B already had a .40 sized engine in the market. MECOA RJL acquired the Conquest .40 tooling at the same time as the .15 and it's still in their possession.

- 1987 Queen Bee .074 RC(Cat# 3701 manufactured 1987)

Rear reed valve RC engine. Uses a standard glow plug. Power output is similar to Tee Dee .051. Came out Mid 1987 and is listed in Cox 1987 Catalog.

== Cylinders ==
There was a wide range of cylinders produced with three different wall thicknesses. Most are interchangeable between all engine types which can create problems when buying a used engine. All early cylinders had a thin wall which was later found to need improvement because they bent easily in a crash or when trying to undo with a Cox wrench. Some people refer to these as Mk1 cylinders. The next type was thickened at the exhaust ports and are also known by some people as Mk2. The third type was thick wall the way down from the cooling fins to the bottom. This one facilitated the exhaust throttle ring and some people refer to this as a Mk3 although Cox never referred to them in this way.

Note: The chart does not differentiate between specific modifications and changes made over the years as the company changed hands.

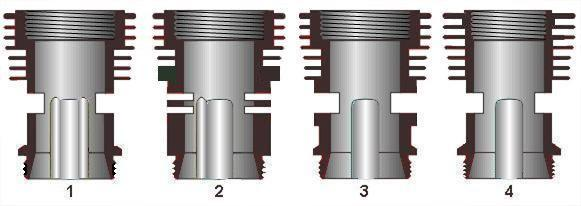
Cox 049 Cylinder cross-sections

Cox Venom Cylinder

Referring to the Cylinder Cross-sections above:

1. depicts a thin wall Tee Dee .049 cylinder with dual booster ports on the bypass port.
2. is a late model thick wall cylinder with slit exhaust and a single bypass booster.
3. is a Black Widow #1 cylinder with no bypass booster with a stepped wall.
4. is a pre-1955 cylinder used on early Space Bug, Space Bug Jr, Thermal Hopper and Strato Bug. Note how the thread diameter for the glow head is much smaller. No engines produced after 1955 used this cylinder.

The most powerful cylinder piston combination without a doubt is the number 4 Tee Dee 049 cylinder. This cylinder has a tapered grind and tapered and lightened piston so the piston fit gets tighter as the piston reaches top dead center (TDC). The intake or bypass porting is 2 deep ports with 2 bypass booster ports on each bypass. This setup causes a swirling of the intake fuel air mixture which promotes better combustion. The Tee Dee cylinder was the basis for the design of the Venom and Killer Bee Cylinders.

Engine	Exhaust ports	Bypass ports	Bypass boosters	SPI	Tapered grind	Number on cyl.
Space Bug	Open	2	0	Yes	Yes	None
Thermal Hopper	Open	2	0	Yes	Yes	None
Space Bug Jnr	Open	1	0	Yes	Yes	None
Space Hopper	Open	2	0	Yes	Yes	None
Strato Bug	Open	2	0	Yes	Yes	None
Product Engine '76	Open	1	0	Yes	No	2
SureStart '99	Slit	2	1	No	No	None
Babe Bee '76	Open	1	0	Yes	No	2
Golden Bee '76	Open	1	0	Yes	No	2
Black Widow pre 96	Open	2	0	Yes	No	1
Black Widow post 96	Slit	2	1	No	No	None
Texaco '95	Slit	2	1	No	No	None
QRC pre 96	Open	2	0	No	No	6
QRC post 96	Slit	2	0	No	No	None
Killer Bee ‘96	Slit	2	1	Yes	Yes^{1}	None
Killer Bee ‘02	Slit	2	1	No	No	None
Venom '96	Open	2	1	Yes	Yes^{1}	None
Medallion pre 96	Open	2	0	Yes	No	1
Medallion post 96	Slit	2	0	No	No	None
Medallion 051	Slit	2	1	No	No	7
Tee Dee 049	Open	2	2	Yes	Yes^{2}	4
Tee Dee 051	Open	2	2	Yes	Yes	5

Notes:
SPI = Sub Piston Induction
^{1} The Killer Bee and Venom had a special competition lightweight piston and a heavy duty crank shaft for speeds above 22K rpm.
^{2} The Tee Dee also had a tapered cylinder and the crank was stronger and ported different from the Medallion crank.

== Pistons ==
Cox Pistons Pre and post 1957

The early engines that were produced before 1957 had a light alloy piston rod which is retained in its socket by a slotted steel retaining cup which in turn is held in place by a steel circlip located in a shallow groove in the interior piston wall. This arrangement (known as a three-piece piston) was abandoned as of 1957 in favor of a hardened steel rod that was swaged into a bearing cup formed integrally in the piston interior. The advantage of this latter set-up was that it simplified assembly and the bearing could be re-set to take up play using a suitable "reset" tool to re-swage the cup.

The engines that used the early-style three-piece piston are any engines produced prior to 1957, i.e. Space Bug, Space Bug Jnr, Thermal Hopper and Strato Bug. Since the Space Bug, Space Bug Jr and Thermal Hopper were produced up until 1958 you will find versions of these early engines around with the later-style pistons. (and cylinders)

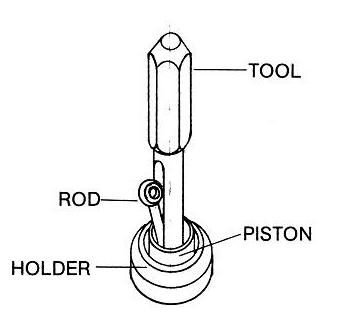
Cox Reset Tool

The post-1957 piston is coated with copper on the inside and top. This was done to prevent the nitrile hardening process from hardening the ball socket joint area. The outside wall of the piston was then finely machined and polished to produce a chromed appearance.

=== Piston / Conrod ball socket joint free play ===
Sometimes, especially with engines that have had a lot of use, the piston / conrod ball socket joint is very loose and will adversely affect performance. A Cox “reset” tool, available for the .010, 020, 049/051 and the 09 series engines, is used to tighten the ball joint back up again. The correct free play is .001 to .003 inches. The .15 engines use a wrist pin so a socket reset tool is not required for these.

== Crankshafts ==
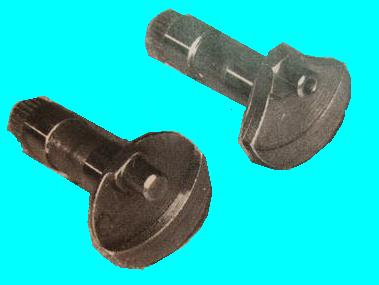
Babe Bee (left) - Killer Bee (right)

On the Bee engines there were 3 types of crankshaft produced. (and 2 are interchangeable). The normal babe bee & Killer bee crankshafts are interchangeable. A third 'Car' crankshaft will only fit into a car crankcase with wide neck.

1. All Bees with the exception of the Killer Bee and Venom had the same crankshaft that was only good for about 20,000 rpm before the conrod pin would break off.
2. The Killer Bees and Venom had a heavy duty balanced and lightened crankshaft that improved performance and could withstand speeds in excess of 22,000 rpm.

A company named Davis Diesel Development in the USA also made a similar crankshaft called a Killer crank for their diesel conversions. They found under the heavier torque loads caused by running diesel fuel, that the pins would break also; hence they produced their own killer crank. The same Killer cranks are now being produced again by Cox International.

On the Tee Dees and Medallions the cranks are also interchangeable but quite different. The Tee Dee has a large square hole at the intake end of the crank whereas the Medallion has a smaller round hole. The timing is also different. On the later TD RC versions, the crankshaft is lightened and strengthened similar to the Killer Bee crank. i.e. ground away and hole in conrod pin.

== Glow heads ==
=== Cox glow heads ===
Five main types of Cox glow heads were produced for the Cox 049:

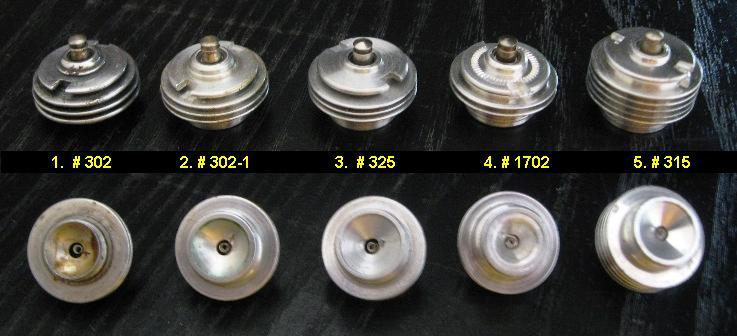
Cox 049 heads

- #302 Pre 1955 Standard Head - Hemispherical shape - Low Compression - Smaller dia. threads - used on Space Bug, Thermal Hopper, Space Bug Jnr and Strato Bug Only.
- #302-1 Post 1955 Standard Head - Hemispherical shape - Low Compression - Larger dia. threads - used on all engines produced post 1955 until the #325 head was produced in 1979.
- #325 Standard Head - Hemispherical shape - Low Compression - Larger dia. threads - used on all post 1956 engines except Tee Dees, QZ, Killer Bees, Venom and Texaco. Replaced 302-1 head in 1979. There are several different exterior appearances to standard glow heads, all noting a slightly different internal shape, compression and glow coil heat.
- #1702 Hi Compression Head - Trumpet shaped - High Compression - knurled top - 4 fins on early, 3 fins on later (fastest), 2 fins on most recent - used on Tee Dees, Killer Bees, QZ and Venom. differences range from 4 fin heads being high compression dome shaped to high compression trumpet shaped.
- #315 Texaco Head - Hemispherical shape - Low Compression - 5 fins - used on Texaco Engine only. Supposedly allows greater cooling for engine when swinging larger propellers.

There are some minor variations to the above-mentioned heads, including different thickness cooling fins and thicker centre electrodes on later model OEM glow plugs. However, the internal shape and glow plug filament remained the same.

=== Special glow heads ===
Along the way there were also some special heads made:

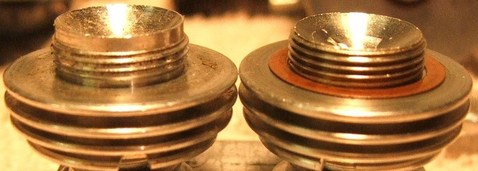
Left: #302RH; right: #302

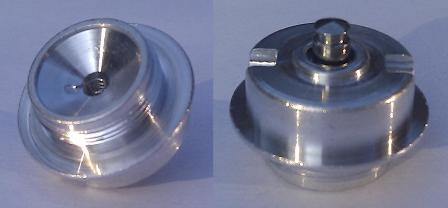
Cox #335 Glow Head

- #302RH 1953 Racing Head - Hemispherical shape - High Compression - Smaller dia. threads as used on Space Bug, Thermal Hopper, Space Bug Jnr and Strato Bug only.
- #??? "W" element Standard Head - Hemispherical shape - Low Compression - Larger dia. threads. The concept was borrowed from either Atwood or Holland engines and Cox lost the ensuing patent fight therefore the production run was very short due to the legal situation.
- #331 & #335 Special 1 fin car head. This head was built for the 1992 Cox GTP Nissan, Stocker and Indy Car engines. The engine used a purpose built heat sink assembly with cooling fins Cat#1972

W-style filament glow head

=== Aftermarket glow heads ===
- Standard glow plug head—uses standard conventional glow plug—low compression—standard performance. Still produced by MECOA K&B Manufacturing.
- Hi Compression Head - Trumpet shaped - High Compression - knurled top. Still produced by MECOA K&B Manufacturing.
- Turbo glow plug head—medium compression—high performance and several heat ranges available (makes them very good for RC applications)
- Norvel Freedom Glow Plug—high compression—high performance— (available from NV engines)
- Galbreath Head with Nelson Plug Combo—high compression—high performance—most popular for small prop/high rpm applications, gives the engine an immediate performance boost by up to 2,500 rpm depending on the engine.
- Cox International Insert Style glow head—available in both Standard and Texaco style
- Merlin insert style with clamp ring; very high compression ratio (needs extra head shims); high performance

== Reed valves ==
Original star shaped copper reed

Modern stainless steel reed

There were three main types of reed valve produced:

1. Early engines—Space Bug, Thermal Hopper, Strato Bug—circular twin copper reeds
2. Bee Engines prior to 1989—star-shaped single beryllium copper reed held in place by a circlip reed retainer. (see image on left)
3. Later Bees, Killer Bees, Venom (post-1989) —oval-shaped stainless steel reed which is held in place by a plastic reed retainer. (see image on right)

Later variants of the star and oval reeds were made of Mylar and Teflon. Some say Mylar is the best while others prefer the stainless steel and then others prefer the Teflon. Claims are that Mylar and Teflon are lighter and make the engine easier to start and go faster, but they do not last as long as the stainless ones.

== Propellers ==
049 engines run well on a 5×3 to 6×3 prop. A 5.7×3 APC works well. To get any suitable speed for mouse racing a 4-inch pitch prop is required at high revs but to do this plenty of nitro-methane is also required, for example, a 4.75 × 4 prop with 40% Nitro. Texaco engines are designed to use bigger props, e.g. 7×4.

== Fuel ==
The highest performance is achieved with fuel of 30% or more nitro content. At least 20% oil (50/50 castor/synthetic) is recommended. Acceptable performance can be had without nitromethane, although the engine will be very sensitive to needle adjustments making it more difficult to operate. With high nitromethane (nitro) fuel it may be necessary to lower the compression by installing up to six or more additional head gaskets.

When using castor oil it is advisable to clean the engine cylinder wall with a Scotch-Brite pad to remove castor oil varnish buildup that will occur, especially after lean running. This buildup of varnish will cause the engine to run inconsistently.

To avoid this problem, it is advised to use a synthetic oil or a synthetic and castor oil blend. Synthetic oil contains detergents that will keep the cylinder wall clean; however, these small engines do rely on some castor oil buildup to maintain high compression at higher running temperatures.

Using clean fuel and keeping everything clean and free from dust and dirt particles is also very important for consistent running in an engine of such small size as these.

Cox fuel formula:

Fuel name	Methanol	Nitro-methane	Castor oil	Klotz oil
Glow Power	70%	10%	18%	2%
Flight Power	65%	15%	18%	2%
Race Power	50%	30%	18%	2%

== Diesel conversion ==
Davis Diesel Development manufactures and sells heavy duty Bee cranks (Killer cranks) and diesel conversion heads. These can be purchased direct from their web site or from eBay. The DD cranks are similar to the original Cox Killer Bee crank.

Other conversion heads are made by MECOA RJL, and include .049, .074 and .09 engines. These use an O-ring seal rather than a Teflon disk.

== Use in radio controlled models ==
Cox .049 Surestart R/C throttle

At the time Cox developed the first Cox engines, they were used in control line and free flight model planes as there was no market for throttled radio control engines back then. Radio control, although first developed in the 1890s it was not available for model airplanes until the 1950s and did not become economically viable for small model planes until the mid-1970s and even then was for the modelers who could afford it. It was certainly out of reach of the hands of most children.

From the mid-1960s Cox produced throttle control devices for some of their engines; however, these were not as effective as throttles on other brand engines as the Cox throttle worked by restricting exhaust flow. Exhaust throttles were produced for most Bee and all Medallion engines but not Tee Dee.

In 1988, Cox produced an engine with a true throttle-able R/C carburetor and that engine was the Queen Bee .074. In 1994, Cox produced the Tee Dee .05 and .09 both of which had a conventional R/C carburetor with adjustable airbleed and a full muffler.

In 2010, an after market R/C throttle/choke was developed for the .049 reed valve engines. The throttle attached to the choke tube on Sure Start .049 engines and acted like a cold-start choke on regular engines. The throttle was developed by Saras Associates and was marketed through Cox International.

== Cox ready to fly model airplanes ==
Over the years, as well as producing millions of model engines Cox also produced a similar number of ready to fly (RTF) airplanes, as well as boats, cars, helicopters, and trains.

The following is a list of the RTF airplanes produced by Cox between 1953 and 1980:

Year	Model	Cat. #	Engine	Notes
1953	TD1	400	Space Bug .049	Cox's first RTF
1954	TD3	600	Space Bug Jnr .049	
1956	TD4 Trainer	B51, 5100	350 Babe Bee .049	
1957	Super Cub 105	C52, 5200	350 Babe Bee .049	Replaced by the Super Cub 150
1958	Lil Stinker	D53, 5300	100 Pee Wee .020	First 020 powered plane
1958	Super Sabre	E54, 5400	100 Pee Wee 0.020	
1959	P40 Warhawk	5500	350-1 Super Bee .049	Dual bypass port Babe Bee
1960	Commanche	5600	110-1 0.15 Sportsman	Larger 2.5cc engine for Dads
1960	PT-19 Trainer	5700	350 Babe Bee .049	Also came out in 5710, 5761, 5900 and 6300
1960	Curtiss Pusher (Kit)	5800	350-2 Babe Bee .049	First kit form RTF
1961	Avion Shinn 2150-A	6200	190 Product Engine	
1962	Ju87D Stuka	6400	190-1 Product Engine	190-1 has a dual bypass cylinder - drops bomb
1962	Avion P51B Bendix Trophy Racer	6600	190-2 Product Engine	Special backplate and needle valve
1962	Super Cub 150	5200	190-4 Product Engine	Updated version of earlier Super Cub 105
1963	Curtiss SB2C Helldiver	7000	190-3 Product Engine	190-3 also has dual bypass - pilot bails out
1963	L-4 Grasshopper	7200	190-4 Product Engine	
1963	Spook	7420	290 Spook Engine	Flying wing (kit form)
1963	Avion P51B Mustang	7600	190-2 Product Engine	Special backplate and needle valve
1964	P40 Kittyhawk	8400	350-1 Super Bee .049	RAF version of P40 Warhawk
1964	Spitfire	7800	350-6 Silver Bee .049	First version of Spitfire replaced in 1966
1965	Curtiss A-25 Bomber	7100	190-3 Product Engine	Dive bomber - drops bombs in flight
1966	RAF Spitfire	7800	350-6 Silver Bee .049	2nd version with RAF colour scheme
1966	T-28	7900	290 Product Engine	
1966	QZ PT-19 Trainer	5900	450 QZ .049	PT-19 with QZ engine
1967	AD-6 Skyraider	9700	190-6 Product Engine	
1968	F2G-1 Corsair	7500	290 Product Engine	#7562 with flying accessories
1968	Pitts Special	5300, 8200	100 Pee Wee 020	Variation of the lil Stinker
1969	Thompson Trophy Corsair 27	2900	290 Product Engine	
1969	Red Baron	5300	100 Pee Wee 020	Also released as "Red Knight"
1969	Mini Stunt Biplane	7300	100 Pee Wee 020	Another version of the lil Stinker
1969	Ryan ST-3 Super Sport	6200 (& 6200–80)	90-1 Pee Wee 020	also available in throttled version 6200-80
1969	Ryan PT Army Trainer	6300 (& 6300–80)	100 Pee Wee 020	same as 6200 & 6200-80 but in Army colors
1970	Corsair II	3900	290 Product Engine	Chrome plated - left hand prop.
1971	Acro Cub	4600	190-4 Product Engine	variant of the Super Cub
1971	Rivets	6800	350-9 Product Engine	popular design sought by collectors
1971	P51D Miss America Mustang	6900	190-7 Product Engine	Stars and stripes color scheme
1971	P51D Mustang	7600	190-6 Product Engine	bubble canopy
1972	Sopwith Camel	8000	191-0 Product Engine	Dog fighter series
1972	Fokker DVII	8100	191-2 Product Engine	Dog fighter series
1972	Fokker DR1 Triplane	8300	191-0 Product Engine	Dog fighter series
1973	Super Sport Trainer	8600	191-3 Product Engine	Pink aerobatics trainer
1973	Bushmaster	8700	190-4 Product Engine	convertible with floats and skis
1974	Super Stunter	5400	191-2 Product Engine	First design with foam wings
1975	Sky-Copter	7100	100 Pee Wee 020	First helicopter (free flight)
1975	Cessna 150	4000	191-8 Product Engine	Sure Flyer with autopilot
1975	Piper Comanche	4100	191-8 Product Engine	Sure Flyer with autopilot
1975	Combat Mustang	7700	190-6 Product Engine	2 speed throttle control
1975	Super Chipmunk	9300	191-7 Product Engine	Foam wing stunter
1976	Skymaster	4200	191-8 Product Engine	Sure Flyer with autopilot
1976	P-39 Airacobra	4300	191-8 Product Engine	Sure Flyer with autopilot
1976	Crusader Stunt Trainer	9000	191-9 Product Engine	Foam wing stunter
1977	Wings F-15 Eagle	3310	192-3 Product Engine	One piece beginner plane
1977	Wings Hustler	3315	192 Product Engine	One piece beginner plane
1977	Wings F-16 Falcon	3320	192-3 Product Engine	One piece beginner plane
1977	Wings Mantis	3325	192 Product Engine	One piece beginner plane
1978	Star Cruiser UFO	7200	360-3 Product Engine	Free Flight
1979	RAF Spitfire	7800	192-4 Product Engine	Reissue of RAF Spitfire
1980	Wild Wings - F15 Eagle	6220	21924 Product Engine	Wild Wings Series
1980	Wild Wings - Red Devil	6240	21924 Product Engine	Wild Wings Series
1980	Wild Wings - Night Wing	6210	21924 Product Engine	Wild Wings Series
1980	Wild Wings - Baron	6230	21924 Product Engine	Wild Wings Series
1980	Sky-Ranger Helicopter	4900	350 Babe Bee 049	Coast Guard Free Flight
1980	Buck Rogers Invader	4800	360-3 Product Engine	Free Flight

Notes:
Part numbers appear to skip and jump, however, cars and boats produced around the same times had numbers similar to the airplanes, therefore causing gaps. (see "Other Cox Toys" below)

== Other Cox Toys ==
Over the years, Cox also produced a range of model cars and boats.

The following is a list of cars and boats produced by Cox between 1954 and 1976:

Year	Model	Cat. #	Engine	Notes
1954	Prop Rod	900	Space Bug Jnr .049	Cox's first air propelled car.
1956	Prop Rod	900	350 Babe Bee .049	engine changed to Babe Bee
1956	Water Wizard Hydroplane	A50, 5000	350 Babe Bee .049	Cox's first boat.
1960	Mercedes-Benz W-196	6000	350-3 Babe Bee .049	First Babe Bee car engine
1964	Buick Riviera	8240	350-4 Babe Bee .049	
1964	Corvette Sting Ray	8640	350-5 Babe Bee .049	
1964	Ford GT Le Mans MkII	8940	350-5 Babe Bee .049	
1965	Chaparral	9340	350-7 Babe Bee .049	Authorized by Jim Hall
1967	American Eagle Indy Racer	9640	350-8 Babe Bee .049	Authorized by Dan Gurney
1968	Shrike	9100	350-P Baby Bee .049	Inverted engine
1969	Dune Buggy	3700	350-4 Babe Bee .049	Pull Starter
1969	Group 7 Road Racer	9340	350-7 Babe Bee .049	Same as Chaparral
1969	Eagle Indy Car (Blue)	9640	190-6 Product Engine .049	plastic back plate
1969	Eagle Indy Car (Red)	4500	190-6 Product Engine .049	
1969	Sea Bee Boat	2800	350-3 Babe Bee .049	Pull starter
1969	VW Baja Bug	6000	350-4 Babe Bee .049	Pull Starter
1969	AA/Fueler Dragster	6100	190-8 Product Engine .049	
1970	Chopper	6700	350-8 Babe Bee .049	Pull Starter
1972	Pinto Funny Car	6500	190-5 Product Engine .049	
1972	Vega Funny Car	6600	190-5 Product Engine .049	
1972	Sandblaster	8400	190-5 Product Engine .049	
1972	Ski Doo Snow Mobile	8500	190-9 Product Engine .049	
1972	Command Jeep	8800	191-4 Product Engine .049	
1972	Chopper II	4400	350-8 Babe Bee .049	
1973	Action Van	4500	191-6 Product Engine .049	
1974	Matador Stocker	4500	Product Engine .049	Pneumatic Control
1974	Adam 12 Patrol Car	9400	Product Engine .049	
1975	Stinger Funny Car	7900	190-2 Product Engine .049	
1976	Vanblaster	8410	Product Engine .049	Quick Start System
1976	Magblaster	8420	Product Engine .049	Quick Start System

== See also ==
- Control line (model aircraft)
- Cox Models
- Free flight (model aircraft)
- Model aircraft
