= Gordon Burford =

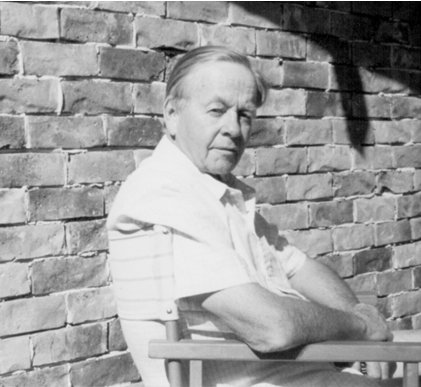
- Gordon Burford
- Born: 3 August 1919; Adelaide, South Australia
- Died: 12 March 2010 (aged 90); Queensland, Australia
- Known for: model aircraft engine design and manufacture Sports administrator

Gordon Burford (3 August 1919 – 12 March 2010) was an Australian model aircraft engine designer and manufacturer. He was Australia's premier model engine builder. He produced thousands of engines of many different designs including the GeeBee, Sabre, GloChief and Taipan brands. Gordon was also a respected aeromodeler starting with Free Flight at a young age prior to World War II before pioneering in Control line after the war.

After the war ended, importation into Australia of model engines was difficult and expensive due to Australia's remoteness to the rest of the world. Gordon saw an opportunity of manufacturing his own engines for the Australian market. His first engine, produced in 1946, was the Gee Bee, a 5cc diesel motor based on the Sparey 5cc diesel design that had been recently published in England.

What was to follow was a long pedigree of diesel and glow engines from 1cc up to 10cc displacement until Gordon retired in 1974 and handed the business to his son Peter. Gordon then directed his energy into the interest of Australian aeromodelers by taking on the position of Federal Secretary and Treasurer of the Model Aeronautical Association of Australia (MAAA).

Gordon Burford died on 12 March 2010, following a fall at his home in Currumbin Queensland.

== Engines Manufactured ==
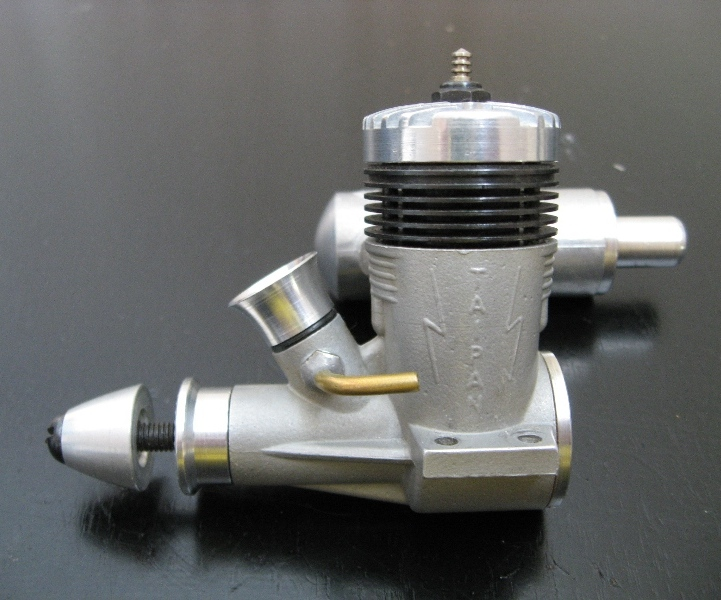
Taipan 2.5cc (0.15 cubic inch) Glow engine (Mk 3 1968)

=== Gee Bee ===
Gee Bee Gordon's first engines.

Year	Name	Size	Type	Notes
1946	GB1	5cc	Diesel	Based on the Sparey 5cc diesel
1947	GB2	5cc	Diesel	Based on the American Drone engine
1949	Gee Bee Stuntmota MkIII	5cc	Diesel or Glowplug	Based on the American Drone engine
1950	Gee Bee 50	5cc	Diesel	New design
1950	Gee Bee 50G	5cc	Glow	Glow version
1950	Gee Bee 75	7.5cc	Glow	Bored out GB50G

=== Sabre ===
Sabre was the name Gordon chose for his engines, but was threatened with legal action in 1956 by North American Aviation who built the F-86 Sabre jet. Gordon decided not to use the name anymore, rather than go through a costly legal battle.

Year	Name	Size	Type	Notes
1950	Mk 1 Sabre 2.5cc	2.5cc	Diesel	Inspired by the 1949 Elfin 2.49 and OK Cub 049
1951	Mk 2 Sabre 250	2.5cc	Diesel	Improved crankcase design
1951	Sabre 150	1.5cc	Diesel	Small production run
1951	Sabre 49	8cc	Glow	Based on the Atwood Triumph
1952	Sabre 29 Mk 1	5cc	Glow	Inspired by the Veco 29
1952	Sabre 19	3.27cc	Glow	Inspired by K&B 19
1953	Mk 3 Sabre 2.5cc	2.5cc	Diesel	New crankcase design
1955	Mk 4 Sabre 2.5cc	2.5cc	Diesel	Improved design
1955	Sabre 35	6cc	Glow	Inspired by the K&B 25 "green head" Same bore and stroke as Fox 35

=== Glo Chief ===
Glo Chief was the name originally chosen as a replacement for Sabre for the larger Glow plug engines. Gordon later decided to use Taipan for all his engine designs.

Year	Name	Size	Type	Notes
1957	Mk 1 Glo Chief 29 & 35	5cc and 6cc	Glow	Copy of the Fox 29 and Fox 35
1958	Mk 2 Glo Chief 29 & 35	5cc and 6cc	Glow	Reverts to Sabre/Taipan styling.
1959	Mk 2 Glo Chief 29 & 35	5cc and 6cc	Glow	Larger crank, flared venturi
1959	Glo Chief 49	8cc	Glow	1959 & 1961 Gold Trophy Winner
1960	Glo Chief 19	3.27cc	Glow	First engine with RC Throttle
~1961	Mk 3 Glo Chief 29 Prototype	5cc	Glow	never made it to production
1963	Mk 4 Glo Chief 29 & 35 BR	5cc and 6cc	Glow	Ball race crankshaft mounting.
1964	Mk 5 Glo Chief 29	5cc	Glow	Change in crankcase design
1965	Mk 5 Glo Chief 36	6cc	Glow	Unbranded crankcase

=== Taipan ===
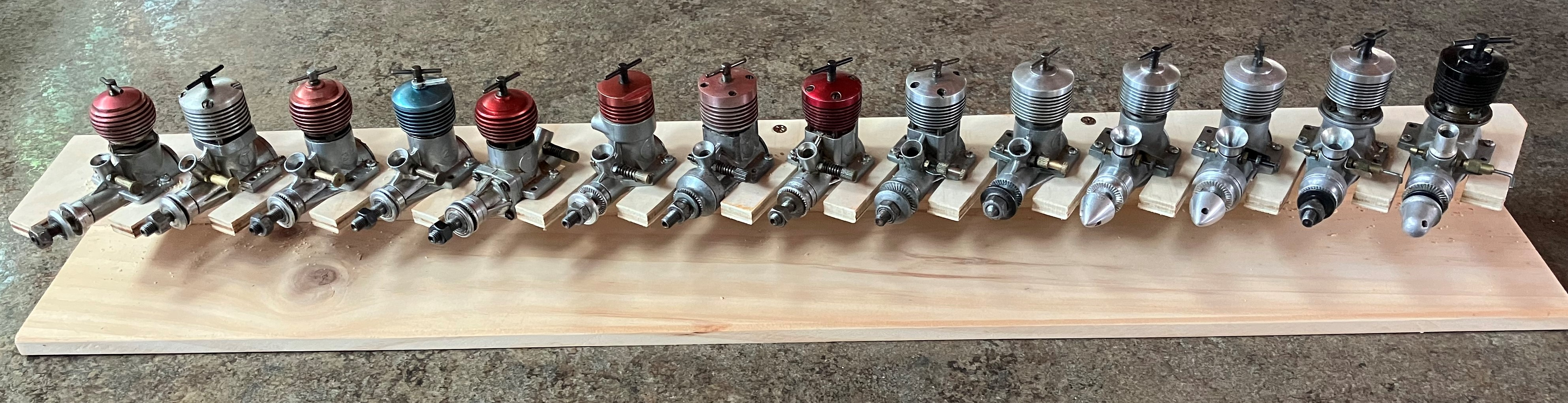
Taipain 2.5cc Diesel Series Mk1 to Mk11

Taipan is the brand name that is synonymous with the name Gordon Burford. Hundreds of thousands of these engines were produced and sold worldwide.

Year	Name	Size	Type	Notes
1956	Taipan 29 Mk 1	5cc	Glow	Basically a Sabre 29 Mk 2 with name removed but has a "Drop In Sleeve" cylinder with Aluminium Fins
1956	Taipan 35	6cc	Glow	Basically a Sabre 35 with name removed but has a "Drop In Sleeve" cylinder with Aluminium Fins
1956	Mk 1 Taipan 2.5cc diesel	2.5cc	Diesel	Carry over from Sabre 2.5 Mk 4.
1957	Mk 2 Taipan 2.5cc Diesel	2.5cc	Diesel	New design based on the Frog 2.49.
1958	Mk 3 Taipan 2.5cc Diesel	2.5cc	Diesel	Reverts to earlier format threaded assemblies.
1958	Mk 1 Taipan 1.5cc Diesel	1.5cc	Diesel	Smaller version of the Mk 3 Taipan 2.5cc diesel.
1959	Mk 4 Taipan 2.5cc Diesel	2.5cc	Diesel	Ball Bearing engine design for team racing.
1959	Taipan 3.5cc R/C Diesel	3.5cc	Diesel	Intended for Radio-controlled airplane use
1960	Mk 5 Taipan 2.5cc Diesel	2.5cc	Diesel	Improved porting.
1961	Mk 2 Taipan 1.5cc Diesel	1.5cc	Diesel	New design inspired by Davies Charlton engines.
1961	Mk 6 Taipan 2.5cc Diesel	2.5cc	Diesel	Ball race engine.
1962	Mk 1 Taipan 2.5cc Glow	2.5cc	Glow	1st 2.5cc Glow engine
1963	Mk 1 Taipan 1.5cc Glow	1.5cc	Glow	Influenced by the OK glowplug line of engines
1963	Mk 3 Taipan 1.5cc Diesel	1.5cc	Diesel	Integral fuel tank similar looking to OK Cub
1963	Mk 7 Taipan "Sport" 2.5cc Diesel	2.5cc	Diesel	Plain bearing engine.
1964	Mk 2 Taipan 2.5cc Glow	2.5cc	Glow	Resembles Fox 15X engine
1965	Mk 8 Taipan "Series 65" 2.5cc Diesel	2.5cc	Diesel	New cylinder style.
1965	Taipan 1cc Diesel	1cc	Diesel	Smallest diesel
1966	Mk 4 Taipan 1.5cc "66 Series" Diesel	1.5cc	Diesel	Based on the 1965 2.5cc Diesel
1967	Mk 2 Taipan 1.5cc "Series 67" Glow	1.5cc	Glow	Resembles Cox Medallion .09
1967	Mk 5 Taipan 1.5cc "Series 67" Diesel	1.5cc	Diesel	First ball race engine
1967	Mk 9 Taipan "Series 67" Taipan 2.5cc Diesel	2.5cc	Diesel	Competition engine
1967	Taipan 19 "Series 67" Glow	3.27cc	Glow	PB and BR versions available
1968	Mk 3 Taipan 2.5cc "Series 68" Glow	2.5cc	Glow	Lightning Bolt model
1968	Mk 10 Taipan "Series 68" 2.5cc Diesel	2.5cc	Diesel	Ball race engine.
1968	Taipan 61 R/C Mk 1	10cc	Glow	Resembles the 1967 Taipan 19 BB engine
1970	Series 70 Taipan 1.5cc Diesel	1.5cc	Diesel	Ball race engine.
1970	Mk 11 Taipan "Series 70" 2.5cc Diesel	2.5cc	Diesel	Ball race engine.
1970	Taipan 61 Mk 2	10cc	Glow	More power
1971	Taipan Tyro Diesel	1.9cc	Diesel	The beginners engine
1972	Mk 4 Taipan 2.5cc Glow	2.5cc	Glow	Pylon Special
1972	Taipan 3.5cc Glow	3.5cc	Glow	Ball race version came in 1973
1973	Mk 5 Taipan 2.5cc Glow "Goldhead"	2.5cc	Glow	AKA 15 TBR Schnuerle Goldhead
1976	Taipan 40	6.55cc	Glow	R/C engine

=== Taipan Marine Engines ===
A line of Taipan diesel and glow marine engines were also produced in various sizes and configurations over the years. These are not detailed here. Details about these and all other Burford engines can be found in the book, Gordon Burford's Model Engines by Maris Dislers.

== See also ==
- Cox model engine
