= Dry bay =

Compartments immediately adjacent to flammable fluids

Dry bays are the compartments immediately adjacent to fuel tanks or other flammable fluids. They frequently contain fluid lines, control lines, electrical equipment, etc. Ballistic damage to some of these bays, from penetration due to weapons fire or other causes, can allow fuel to enter the bay causing fire after contact with electrical components, and loss of the aircraft.

During the Vietnam War the United States suffered combat losses totalling some 5000 aircraft: 2500 fixed-wing jets and 2500 helicopters. As losses increased during the course of the conflict, studies were initiated to find a way to reduce the loss rates, with research that continued after the war. The research analysis revealed that fuel fires and explosions accounted for 50% of the losses, and that half of these were attributable to fuel explosions in voids or so-called dry bays. As a result, the military services in the US and elsewhere joined in an effort to improve the survivability of jet aircraft and helicopters. This led to development and experimentation with a variety of approaches that addressed fire extinguishing in several areas, including engine nacelles/bays, dry bays, fuel tanks, occupied spaces such as cabins and cargo bays, and ground and ship flight decks.
