= Round-the-pole flying =

Round-the-pole flying (RTP) is a form of flying model aircraft, in which the model is attached via a line from its wingtip or fuselage to a central support structure. Control signals can be passed to the model via wires alongside or integral with the attachment line. The operator can control the aircraft using a control console, situated outside the flying circle of the aircraft. Contrast this to control line flying where the pilot/operator stands at the centre of the flying circle and directly supports the aircraft.

RTP can be used indoors or outdoors, though usually requires calm wind conditions if used outdoors. The power source for the model is usually an electric motor, since the power can be supplied via the line and heavy batteries need not be carried. This makes it particularly quiet, clean and suitable for indoor flying. Conventional engines can be used outdoors.

The pole itself is usually a simple stand heavy enough to withstand the centrifugal forces on it. The head of the pole needs to provide a freely rotating hub, and usually incorporates a ball bearing race of some kind. In addition, where signals and power need to pass to the model, some form of slip ring arrangement is required.

Models for RTP can range from the very simple, usually converted from rubber-band powered models, to sophisticated true scale designs. The use of electric power can permit sophisticated control effects such as retracting undercarriage, operating flaps, etc. However the limited degree of freedom of the tethered model precludes the use of full aerodynamic control. Climb and descent are usually effected using variations in power to the motors.

The control console can be nothing more than a simple rheostat allowing the current supplied to the model to be varied. More sophisticated control consoles can be envisaged.

Typical RTP set-ups allow multiple models to fly simultaneously on the same pole. This allows such activities as formation flying and dogfights to take place. A kill in a dogfight is achieved by damaging the opponent's model with the propeller of the attacking model. Alternatively a paper streamer can be trailed behind each model and a kill is confirmed when the streamer has been successfully destroyed.

Other challenges such as flying under, over and between bars, popping balloons and loop the loop can also be attempted.

A yearly RTP Contest is held in Lake Tahoe, California. Called the Aaroone Cup, it requires 0.020 engines and is a speed and Concours d'Elegance contest. Record speeds exceed 60 mph on the 10-foot steel line.

== Round-the-pole flying with Radio Control ==
There is another concept of RTP flying. This concept is with throttle and elevator control. This was invented by the model building club " kottenpark modelbouw club (in Dutch). This is done by using a normal RC-controller. In the pole is a RC-receiver including a RC-servo for controlling the elevator and a speed controller for regulation the electrical motor in the aircraft.

Elevator control and the electrical motor control is done with 2 electrical wires from the pole to the model aircraft. The elevator control is done by shortening one wire while simultaneously lengthening the other wire. This motion is converted in the model aircraft to control the elevator.

The whole idea behind this setup is to learn flying with remote control, because you have only 2 degrees of freedom.
