= Cox Models =

Former division of Estes Industries

Cox Models, formerly a division of Estes Industries of Penrose, Colorado, is currently owned by MECOA (Model Engine Corporation of America) in Irwindale, California. As one of the hobby industry's oldest and most iconic multimillion-dollar companies, Cox is renowned for its production of miniature internal-combustion engines.

== History ==
The company, originally named The L. M. Cox Manufacturing Co, Inc., was founded in 1945 by the machinist Roy Cox in Placentia, California. Cox grew up in and around his father's bicycle shop, and he developed an interest in mechanical devices. Cox's first products were wooden pop guns, produced in his home garage. Cox chose wood for his basic material, since metal was scarce during WW II.

When metals became readily available in the United States in 1947, Cox turned his attention to new products, beginning with a diecast metal car. This product was developed into a "whip car", a tethered vehicle which could be manually swung in a circle at high speed. Nitro- and gasoline-powered tether cars with .60 cubic inch miniature engines capable of speeds of 100 mph (160 km/h) were quickly becoming popular. Cox's first contribution to that growing hobby was a cast aluminum midget racer powered by a .09 and .15 engine by Cameron Brothers of Chino, California.

Cox Manufacturing enjoyed a large postwar growth due in part to its production of miniature model internal combustion engines and control line model aircraft, finally moving to a new factory in Santa Ana, California, in 1963. The factory started at 80,000 square feet (7432 square meters). Three expansions in a few years' time saw expansion to 225,000 square feet (20,903 square meters) and introduction of a line of slot cars, model rockets, HO scale model trains, and a full-sized, one-horsepower gasoline-powered chain saw.

Roy Cox retired in 1969, and he sold the company to the hobby conglomerate "Leisure Dynamics". Kites, toy walkie-talkies, and yo-yos were added to the Cox company products. A major step toward participation in the growing radio controlled hobby business happened in 1976 with the acquisition of the radio manufacturer "Airtronics".

By 1983, Leisure Dynamics was facing bankruptcy. Their engineer William Selzer, the designer of the "Babe Bee" .049 aircraft engine, joined with a local businessman to purchase the Cox company. The new company, Aeromil Engineering Company, changed the name of the company from Cox Company to Cox Hobbies, Incorporated, in 1984. Growth of the company continued, but its factory space became fragmented since the operations were spread out over a number of leased buildings. This prompted a move to a consolidated facility in Corona, California, in 1990.

In January 1996, a leading model toy rocket manufacturer, Estes Industries, purchased Cox Hobbies, Incorporated, and relocated operations from Southern California to the Estes facility in Penrose, Colorado. This signaled a major change in marketing direction for the new company, now known as Cox Models. A great many new products were aimed towards a mass market and they were sold in large chain stores and discount stores.

In February 2009, Estes Industries sold its surplus Cox inventory to several private buyers in the U.S. and Canada, while the former Cox model train line was acquired by the Wm. K. Walthers company. Although MECOA approached Estes that same year to purchase Cox Hobbies in its entirety, Hobbico simultaneously expressed interest in acquiring Estes along with all its subsidiaries. Ultimately, instead of divesting the Cox brand separately, Estes-Cox was sold to Hobbico in late 2009.

In January 2010, Hobbico, based in Champaign, Illinois, became the official owner of the former Cox name, logo, and the Cox Models product line. Following the bankruptcy of Hobbico in 2018, the Model Engine Corp. of America (MECOA) purchased Cox Hobbies in its entirety from the Estes Corporation in 2019.

Through this acquisition, MECOA obtained ownership of the COX product line, trademarks, and logos. The transaction included all original molds, machinery, inventory, tooling, and engineering drawings. Over the following years, amid the disruptions of the COVID-19 pandemic, these assets were relocated from the former facility in Penrose, Colorado, to MECOA’s headquarters in Irwindale, California.

== Notable Cox engine toys ==
In the 1950s and 1960s until recently, Cox has produced a line of hobby-oriented models of cars, airplanes, and other vehicles. The most noted are the .049 cubic-inch displacement glow fuel powered models, controlled by line (Control Line) or by radio (Radio Control).

- AMC Matador .049 engine police car from the TV series Adam-12
- T-28 Trojan airplane model
- The PT 19 flight trainer taught many people control line flying, without risking their own creations. At least the early all-metal reed valve engines, with the rubber spinners that came on ready-to-fly models, survive crashes to be used later in balsa models, thus spreading the hobby and Cox's business.
- There were some odd-looking craft that resembled powered Frisbees.
- Some control line models such as the Douglas A-1 Skyraider and some Ryan primary trainers had three control lines or some other form of throttle control, as well as elevator control.
- The TD-1 was a very popular model in the 1950s. It had a white plastic body with aluminum wings with the old Die Cast tank and aluminum machined crankcase with steel cylinder, Piston and crankshaft.

== Cox engines ==
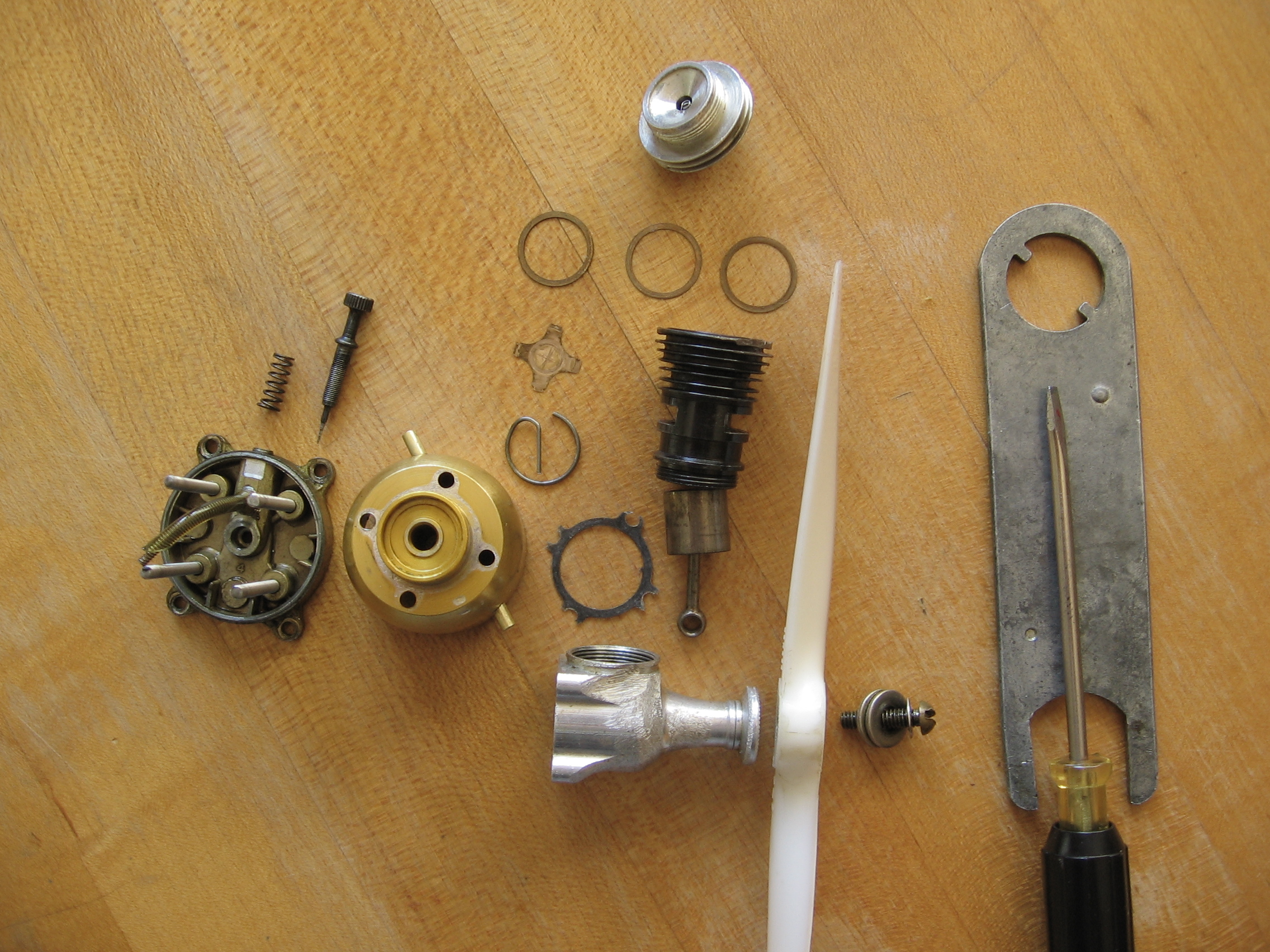
Early Cox Golden Bee disassembled. (Note that the crankcase has been user modified.)

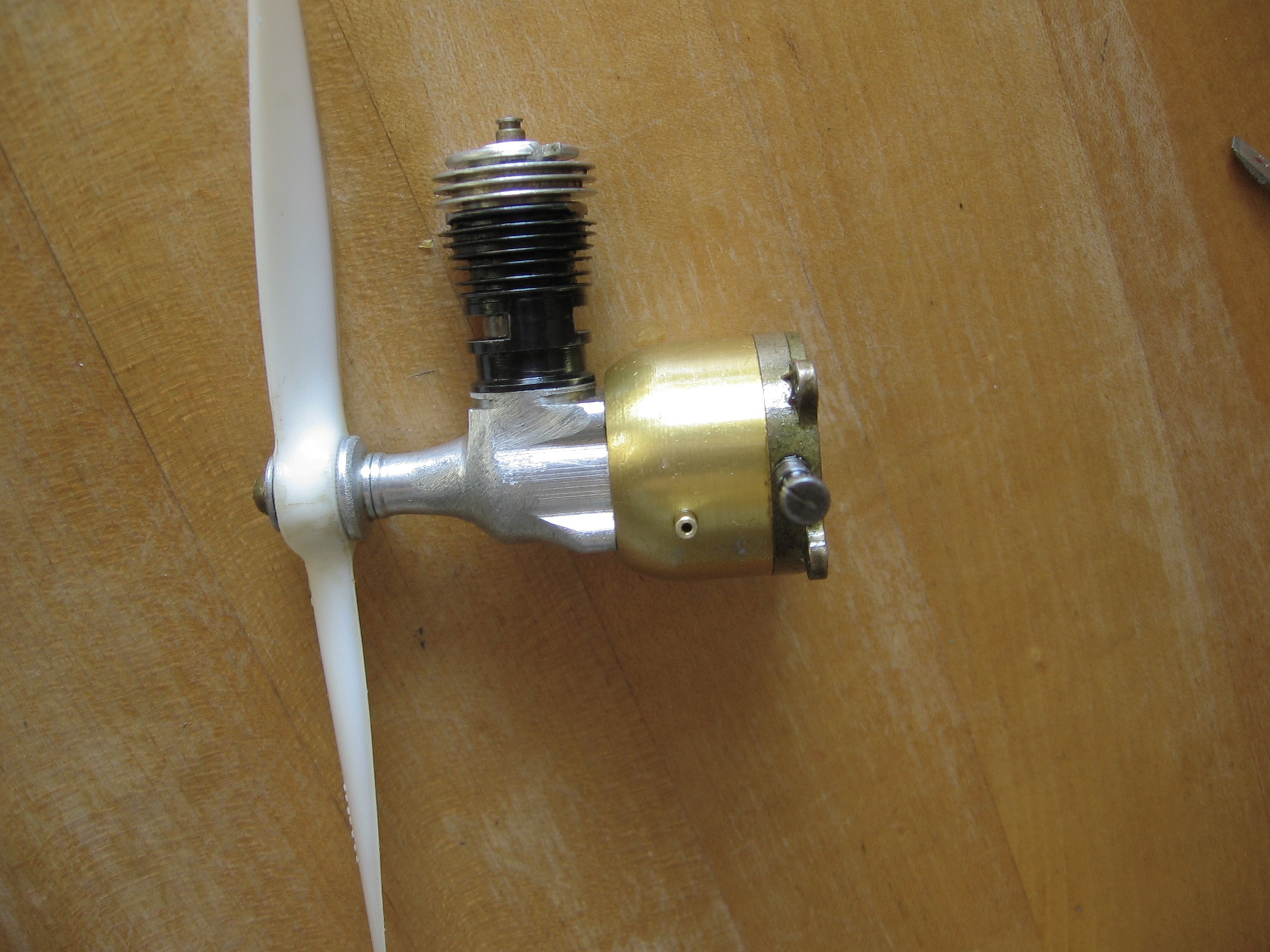
The same Golden Bee assembled.

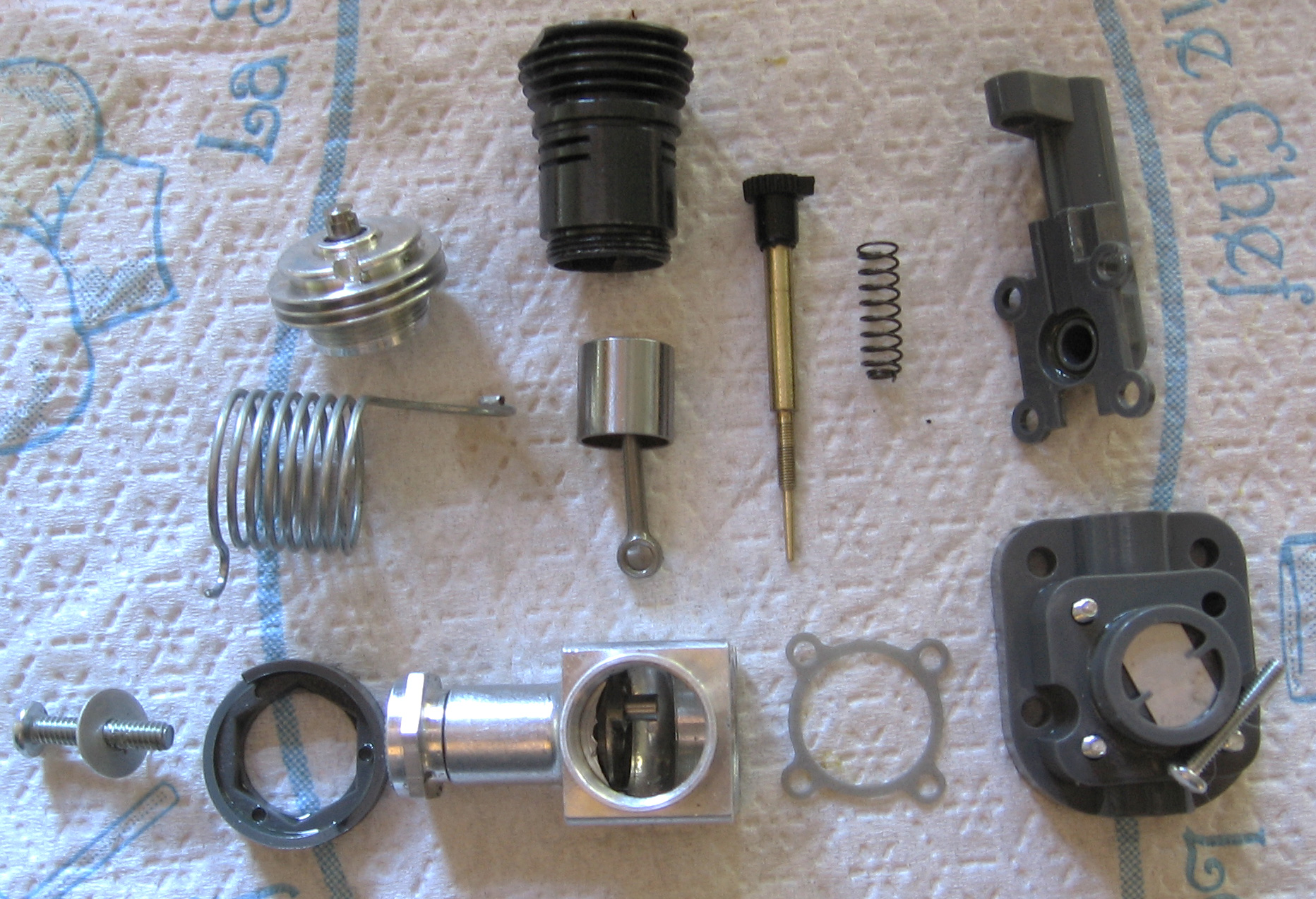
Sure Start disassembled.

=== Reed valve ===
Cox reed valve engines are nearly indestructible. The needle valve and carburettor are behind the cylinder where they are protected, and the crank case, cylinder and fuel tank are all machined from forgings, rather than weaker castings. The tank back plate/carburettor is a zinc alloy casting, or later a plastic casting, but crash stresses are already well distributed by the time they reach it. The claim of dimensional tolerance, in the advertisement shown above, is justified by the facts that the high production volume engines need no break-in, except for a one-minute rich run, and any piston will fit into any cylinder that is the same size.

An example of an 0.049 cubic inch (0.8 cubic cm.) reed valve engine is shown on the right, taken apart (with the tools shown) and assembled. Except for the Golden Bee fuel tank, this engine was bought used in 1979. The starter spring has been removed, allowing the use of a left hand screw propeller. Some unneeded metal has been removed from the front of the crank case.

Below the Bee is a new Sure Start. There are several superficial changes, including that the shape of the reed is different and it is now made of steel. The most substantial change (not visible) is in the carburettor, which now has a large brass spray bar / barrier crossing the round barrel aperture, with a jet hole in its back center. The older carburettor has an abrupt increase in the diameter of the barrel (visible), with the jet at the top of the larger barrel section.

In addition to 0.049 cubic inch (0.80 cc) variants such as these, the 0.020 cubic inch (0.33 cc) Pee Wee was also sold, in large quantities and over several decades, in ready to fly or run models and separately to power other models. The Pee Wee was used in the Little Stinker and was 0.020 engine.

=== Rotary valve ===
Cox Tee Dee .049 on a tank mount.

The TDs (Tee Dee or Thimble Drome) had very high power for their size and ranged from 0.01 in^{3} (0.16 cc) to 0.09 in^{3} (1.5 cc) displacement. They were for serious hobbyists and too temperamental for mass markets. Note, on the Tee Dee shown, that light shows through the external ports, under the piston (sub induction). This engine cannot run properly with a muffler. Sub induction served to allow extra air into the cylinder at high engine speed. This increases the charge of mixture and makes the ignition timing track to engine speed to maintain power over a wider range of rpm. The cylinder head shown is of the low compression Bee type.

Medallions were milder than the TDs but better performers than the reed valve engines.

== See also ==
- Cox model engine
- Leroy M. Cox
