= Leroy M. Cox =

Model engine designer and manufacturer

- Leroy M. Cox (in 1962)
- Born: Leroy Milburn Cox; April 27, 1906; San Bernardino, California, U.S.
- Died: September 22, 1981 (aged 75); Orange County, California, U.S.
- Other names: Roy M. Cox, LM Cox Manufacturing Co.
- Occupation: Entrepreneur
- Known for: Toys, Model airplanes, cars, boats.

Leroy Milburn Cox (April 27, 1906 – September 22, 1981) was an American entrepreneur, world famous for his Cox model engines and gas powered toys including model cars, airplanes and boats.

== Personal life ==
Roy's first wife, Myrtle Lucille Mack was born December 13, 1906, and died June 3, 1968. The couple were married September 12, 1925, in Riverside, California. They had one child, a son, Gerald Edward Cox (born April 8, 1939 – died July 23, 1961). After Myrtle's death, Roy remarried, to Marybell Sauter (May 22, 1918 – November 13, 2005), one of his employees, on January 4, 1969; the couple lived in Corona del Mar, California and remained married until Roy's death in 1981 and had no children.

== Early years ==
As a child, Roy spent a lot of his time after school and on weekends at his father's bicycle shop in Placentia, California. This exposure to bicycle mechanics helped develop a keen interest and skills in mechanical devices. His first business venture was the manufacture of photographic enlargers, however World War II saw metal become very scarce forcing Roy to abandon the project. During the war Roy began a career as an electrician. Roy's entrepreneurial desire caused him to look for something else to do. In 1944, he started making toy wooden pop guns in his garage at home. It was made of wood due to metal still being scarce from the war. The popguns were an instant hit with local schoolkids. After the war, metal became available again and his popgun sales declined.

== Business History ==
In 1946 Roy and his partner Mark Mier developed a metal push pull toy car for toddlers. This car was based on the Indianapolis 500 racers of the day. It later developed into a tethered car and engine manufacturers soon started making engine packages for the cars. The cars became very popular and at one time Cox was producing over 1500 cars per day. In 1948 Roy Cox was approached by the Cameron Brothers, model engine makers, who had built some engine packages specifically for Cox's Champion race car. This engine was sold separately as "Thimble Drome" for the Champion car. In 1950 Roy ventured into engine manufacturing by teaming up with Mel Anderson to produce the O-Forty-Five Special car. This engine was .045 cubic inch and used some parts from Mel Anderson's Spitzy model airplane engine, however the bulk of the engine was Cox's design. In the same year, Roy had noticed the appeal of model airplanes to young children so he and two associates started working on their next venture developing a model airplane engine that was easy to start and had high performance. They spent a year working on the design and what they came up with was the beginning of a long line of successful competition and sport model engines, ready to fly airplanes, car, boats, and just about anything that could run on a motor.

In 1957 Cox took over the Disneyland flight circle at Tomorrowland. In 1960, a new line of high performance competition engines called the "Tee Dee" series was developed with the help of Bill Atwood a well known engine designer and manufacturer. The engines were an instant success. In 1962 slot cars became popular so Cox was straight onto it gearing up manufacturing and now making slot cars, however in 1967 the slot car craze died leaving Cox with cashflow problems as he had plenty of inventory and no one interested in buying it. Following this Roy's wife Myrtle died in June 1968 making his financial problems even greater because he had to pay taxes on his inheritance from his wife's death. He was beginning to develop his own health problems so he retired and sold his company to the huge toy manufacturer Leisure Dynamics. He and his wife traveled and were actively involved in worldwide church missions.

== See also ==
- Cox model engine
- Cox Models
- Free flight (model aircraft)
- Model aircraft
