= Tether car =

Model combustion engine racing cars

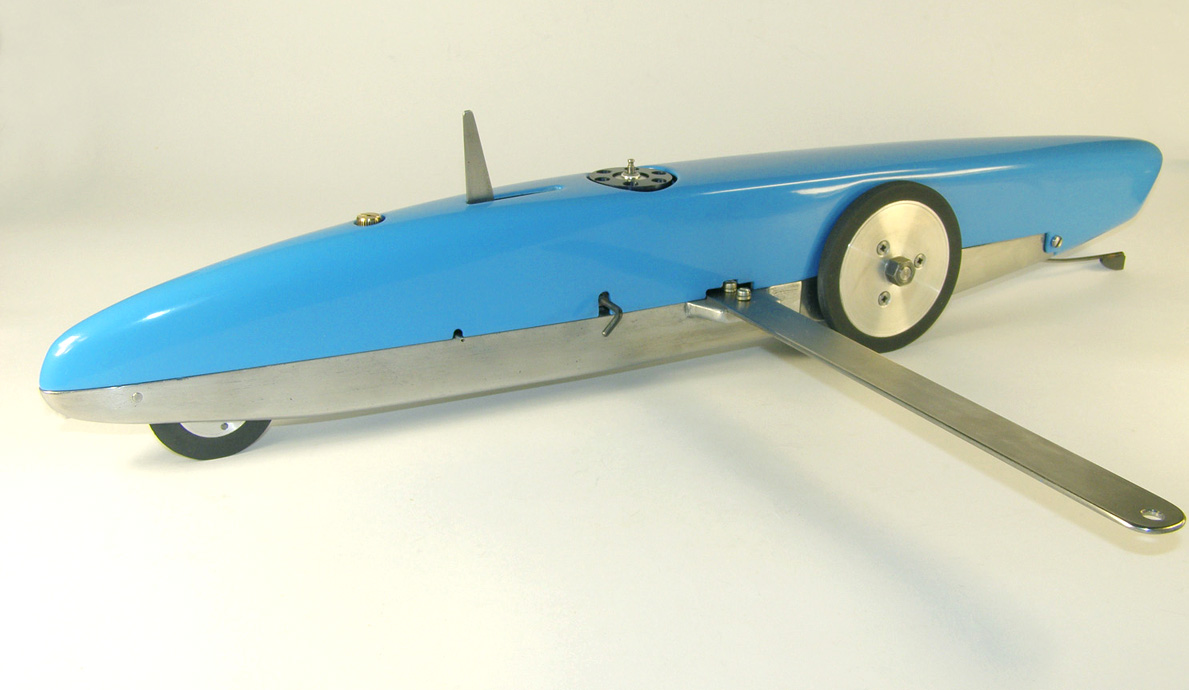
A tether car with 1.5 cc engine

Tether cars (also commonly known as spindizzies) are model racing cars powered by miniature internal combustion engines and tethered to a central post. Unlike radio control cars, the driver has no remote control over the model's speed or steering.

== Basics ==
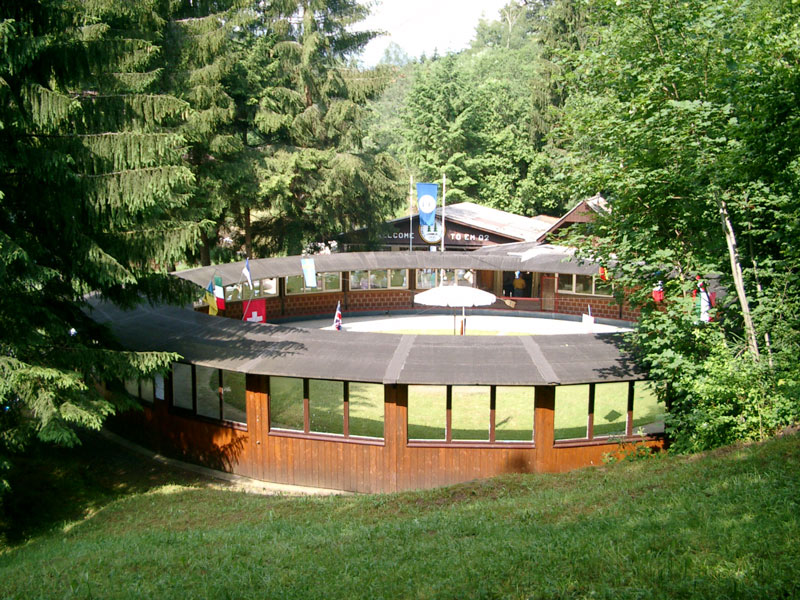
Modern tether car track surrounded by safety walls

Tether cars are often small (less than 1 meter in length), powered by a non-radio controlled model aeroplane engine (two stroke, glow plug, piston liner, etc.), and run on fuel supplied by a fuel tank within the car. Since 2015, electric motor driven cars, powered by batteries, have also emerged.

== History ==
Tether cars were developed beginning in the 1920s–1930s and still are built, raced and collected today. First made by hobby craftsmen, tether cars were later produced in small numbers by commercial manufacturers such as Dooling Brothers (California), Dick McCoy (Duro-Matic Products), Garold Frymire (Fryco Engineering), BB Korn, and many others. Original examples of the early cars, made from 1930s to the 1960s, are avidly collected today and command prices in the thousands of dollars.

== Locations ==
There are tracks in Australia (Brisbane and Sydney), New Zealand, Germany, Switzerland, Estonia, Ukraine, Russia, the United States, and other countries. World Championship races are held every three years. The 2013 World Championships were held in Basel, Switzerland.

== World records ==
Class	Date	Driver	Speed	
Class	Date	Driver	km/h	mph
WMCR I (1.5 cm³)	August 2, 2026	(Ukraine) Andrii Yakymiv	269.802	167.647
WMCR II (2.5 cm³)	August 20, 2016	(Norway) Torbjorn Johannessen	285.711	177.533
WMCR III (3.5 cm³)	March 4, 2017	(Ukraine) Andrii Yakymiv	300.953	187.004
WMCR IV (5 cm³)	April 5, 2014	(Estonia) Tonu Sepp	317.124	197.057
WMCR V (10 cm³)	March 1, 2025	(Estonia) Tonu Sepp	348.432	216.506

== See also ==
- Cox Models, a former manufacturer of ready to run tether cars
- Control line flying model
