= Control line =

Way of controlling a flying model aircraft

A full-fuselage aerobatic control line Strega in flight

Control line (also called U-Control) is a simple and light way of controlling a flying model aircraft. The aircraft is typically connected to the operator by a pair of lines, attached to a handle, that work the elevator of the model. This allows the model to be controlled in the pitch axis. It is constrained to fly on the surface of a hemisphere by the control lines.

The control lines are usually either stranded stainless steel cable or solid metal wires of anywhere from 0.008 in (0.20 mm) to 0.021 in (0.53 mm). Sewing thread or braided fishing line may be used instead of wires, but air resistance is greater. A third line is sometimes used to control the engine throttle, and more lines may be added to control other functions. Electrical signals sent over the wires are sometimes used in scale models to control functions such as retracting undercarriage and flaps.

There is also a control system that uses a single solid wire, this is called Monoline. When the pilot twists the wire around its axis, a spiral inside the airplane spins to move the elevator. While it can be used with some success on any type of model, it is best for speed models where the reduced aerodynamic drag of the single line is a significant advantage. The control provided is not as precise as the two-line control system.

Almost all control-line models are powered with conventional model aircraft engines of various types. It is possible to fly control-line models that do not use on-board propulsion, in a mode called "whip-powered", where the pilot "leading" the model, whose lines are attached to a fishing or similar pole, supplying the necessary energy to keep the airplane aloft, in a fashion similar to kite-flying.

== History ==
Early versions merely constrained the model to fly in a circle but offered no control. This is known as round-the-pole flying. The origins of control-line flight are obscure, but the first person to use a recognizable system that manipulated the control surfaces on the model is generally considered to be Oba St. Clair, in June 1936, near Gresham, Oregon. St. Clair's system used a rather large apparatus similar to a television antenna, onto which many lines were attached. This system is very different from those currently in use on modern control line models. It is of interest to note that St. Clair only produced one model, the Miss Shirley, that used this system, which he called "the Full House." To date, there is no evidence to show anyone else ever built a plane to use the Full House system.

The name most associated with the inventions and promotion of control line, and the inventor of the formerly patented system known as "U-Control" (which was a trademark, and is the system in use on virtually every two-line control line model today) was Nevilles E. " Jim" Walker. His "American Junior" company was by far the biggest producer of models and held numerous patents on the two-line system until overturned during a patent infringement suit by Walker against Leroy M Cox, based on "prior art" from St. Clair in the 1955 trial. One of the most coveted prizes in control-line aerobatics competition sanctioned by the AMA, awarded to the winner of a flyoff between the US Junior, Senior, and Open age class Champions, was originally provided by and is named for Walker. This is one of the oldest perpetual trophies in modeling that is still awarded.

== The airframe ==
Control-line models are built of the same basic materials and construction methods as R/C and free flight models. Control-line model construction varies with the category of model. Aerobatics and combat models are relatively lightly built compare to R/C models as they need high maneuverability in the limited space offered by the control line hemisphere. They are typically built with traditional materials like balsa wood, plywood, paper, plastic, spruce, and polystyrene foam, but modern composite and graphite/epoxy are occasionally used in high-load applications. Combat models must also be relatively easy and quick to build, as mid-air collisions and crashes are common.

Aerobatic model construction is typically quite complex and may require many hundreds of hours. Speed models must be very sturdy to withstand the forces of line tension and to permit a very rigid engine mount for maximum engine performance. Speed models are generally built around an aluminium or magnesium "pan" that forms about half the fuselage. Little or no maneuverability required, as once at speed the model's altitude is maintained by centripetal Acceleration. Racing models need to be both relatively light for good acceleration from the start, or after a pit stop, and to reduce the pitch of the airfoil required to maintain lift. Race Aircraft also be fairly strong to withstand the pit man catching the model after landing.

To control the airplane, the lines must remain in tension. Centripetal Acceleration is generally sufficient to maintain line tension if the airplane is properly "trimmed" (adjusted), but sometimes additional features such as rudder offset and engine offset are added to provide extra tension. It is of interest to note, that when a control line model does a loop, it no longer flies on the edge of a hemisphere, but traverses the edge of a cone, a planar path, and the motion of the model produces no centripetal acceleration. In the condition of flying a loop, other factors must therefore provide the line tension, such as engine offset, or lead-out rake. Weight in the outboard wing tip is usually used to balance the weight of the lines. Top aerobatics models typically have a large number of adjustable features like tip weight boxes, adjustable rudder offset, adjustable line sweep, and adjustable elevator and flap controls. Some aerobatics models use a variable rudder system (commonly called the Rabe rudder after its inventor, Al Rabe) to vary the rudder offset during flight. The adjustment of the various adjustable features on a modern stunt model can become quite complex. Many models also feature a longer inboard wing; aerobatics models use this to balance the lift from side-to-side, compensating for the difference in velocity from inboard to outboard wing, while some speed models use only an inboard wing, which eliminates the drag of the outboard wing completely (these models are colloquially referred to as "Sidewinders"). In general 2/3rds of the aerodynamic drag of the entire control line model systems (Plane, Lead-Outs, Lines/Connectors, Handle) is created by the lines/connectors.

In general there are two types of fuselage construction that are used in control line: "profile" (flat) and "built up". These are built with differing types of wings depending on the specific use of the aircraft. Profile models, where the fuselage is cut out from a single relatively thin sheet of wood with the "profile" of the airplane, are simple to build and repair, and are very common on trainer models. Sometimes the vibration of the engine causes poor engine runs on profile models. Built-up fuselages are much more difficult to build but generally look better and offer superior engine runs.

== Controls ==
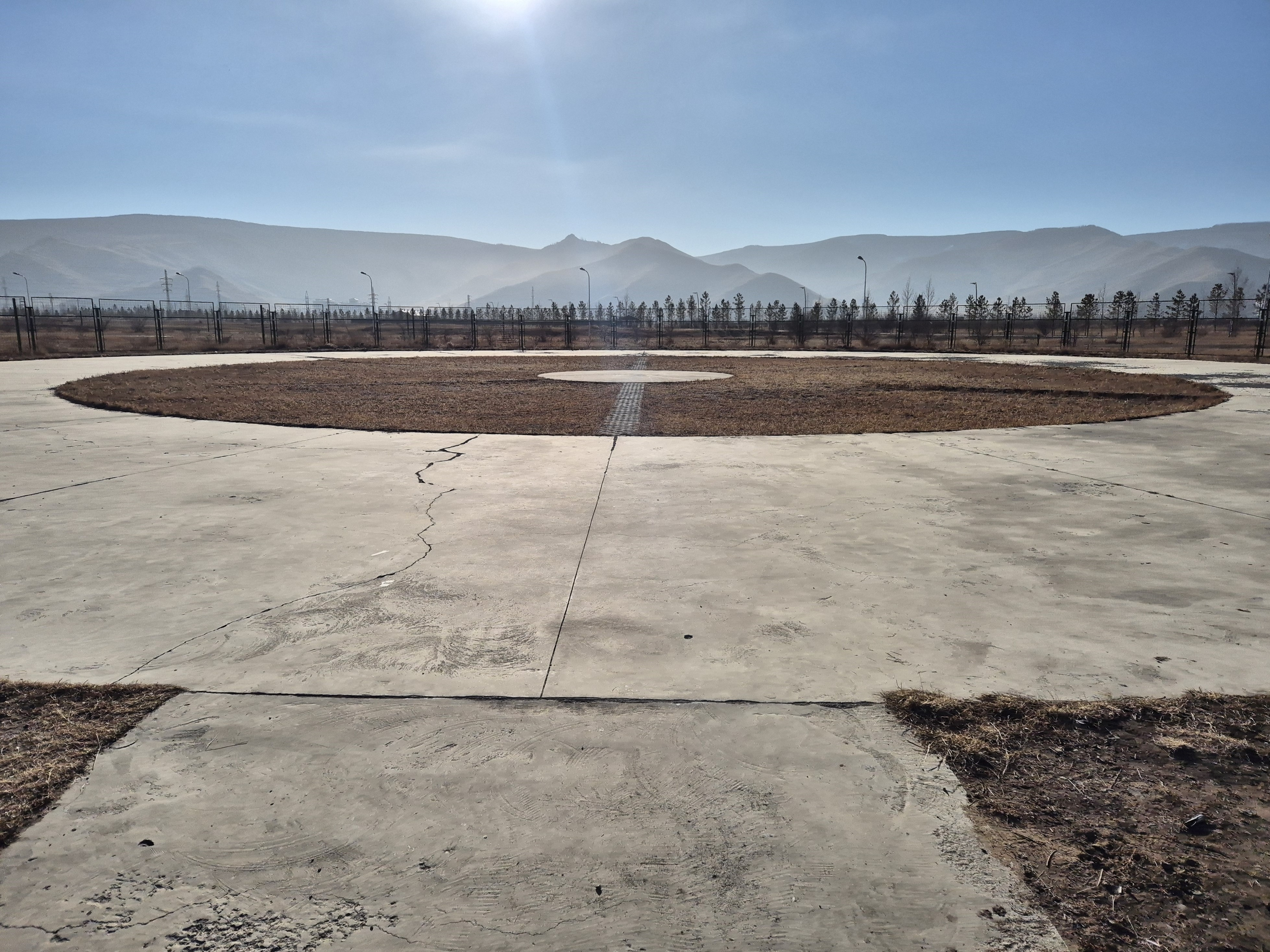
Control line field in Ulaanbaatar, Mongolia

The aircraft is typically controlled by a set of 20–70-foot lines usually of multi strand stainless steel, single strands of piano wire, or G.S.U.M.P. (Gel Spun Ultra-high-molecular-weight polyethylene, made by DuPont). For sport flying, non-metallic lines of kevlar, dacron, or other low-stretch fiber materials are commonly used. This type of control was originally trademarked as "U-Control" and is by far the most common control method.

The controls of a conventional 2-line/"U-Control" system consist of lead-out cables, a bellcrank, push rods and control horns. These are connected so that differential motion of the lines rotates the bellcrank, causing a pushrod to move either forward or aft. The pushrod is connected to the control surface with a control horn that moves the elevator (and flaps, if used) up and down. The pilot holds a handle to which the lines are attached. Tilting the handle with the fingers, wrist, and/or elbow motion causes the differential movement in the lines. By convention, tilting the hand so the top is closer to the pilot than the bottom results in "up" elevator, much like pulling back on a full-scale airplane control stick. Also by convention, most airplanes are flown nominally counter-clockwise as viewed from above, with the leadout cables exiting the left wing. This is not universal and some pilots fly in the opposite direction. Flying clockwise has a slight advantage in some situations because most engines run so that the torque will roll the airplane away from the pilot, increasing line tension in upright level flight.

The controls can be expanded by adding a third line that controls the throttle. The most common system for throttle control is that devised by J. Robert Smurthwait, of Baker Oregon, and is widely available. The throttle is usually a conventional carburetor as used on radio control models schemes that couple limited rudder and/or aileron, and variable leadout position are often found on carrier planes as well as elevator and flaps/ Monoline control works by twisting the single line. The pilot holds a handle with a twisted flat piece of metal on bearings in one hand, and a "bobbin" in the other. Moving bobbin towards or away from the handle twists the line. Inside the airplane, the rotating line rotates a spiral scroll with a follower. The follower moves toward and away from the pivot of the scroll, and has a pushrod attached. Then, as the scroll rotates, the pushrod moves fore and aft. The rest of the system is like the two-line system. The control of a monoline system is much less precise than a two-line system because the line itself tends to twist up before it moves the scroll, leading to a somewhat vague control response with considerable lag. It does however have the advantage of not requiring as much line tension to move the controls, and the single line has less drag than the two slightly smaller lines used in conventional two-line control.

Other control methods were devised early on to avoid having to pay royalties on the "U-Control" patent, including systems with the lines connected directly to the elevator with pulleys to change the pitch, methods that connected the lines directly to the pushrod through screw eyes, but most worked very poorly compared to conventional 2-line control.

== Power ==
Control-Line airplanes usually have a power plant of 0.049 cubic inches (0.80 cm^{3}) to 0.60 cubic inches (9.8 cm^{3}), although engines can be as large as .90, or may have electric power. Two-stroke glow engines are most common, but almost any form of model engine has been used, including pulse jet engines and turbojets. Control-line models tend to have very high power-to-weight ratios compared to R/C models or full-scale aircraft. The size of the engines and the models are significantly limited by the maximum line length of 70 feet (21 m) used for competition, although very long lines (as much as 150 feet) have been used on rare occasions.

The competition categories that need high power output and speed can turn at very high rotational speeds for a reciprocating engine. A 0.15 in^{3} (2.5 cm^{3}) engine used in the FAI Speed event may produce as much as 3 hp (2.2 kW) at rotational speeds in the range of 45000 rpm - faster than some full-scale turbojets. The specific output is around 1200 hp/liter which is far in excess of racing motorcycle engines or Formula 1 auto racing engines. Many breakthroughs in two-stroke engine design (both model and motorcycle) can be traced back to C/L speed models, as the small size makes it easy to experiment with new designs at low cost.

Control line models tend to run a varying mix of fuel however 10% nitromethane, 20% castor oil and 70% methanol is common. Castor oil is sometimes replaced by synthetics, however as control line aircraft typically run at high throttle settings for the entire flight, castor oil generally provides better lubrication and cooling and is thus considered safer for the engine. It is however somewhat viscous and the resulting oil drag can rob some power compared to synthetic oil, and can also lead to "varnishing" of the cylinder. Some older-technology engines commonly used for control line can be very quickly damaged with typical R/C fuels because of low oil content.

Pulse jet models use gasoline, a variety of flammable liquids like acetone, methyl-ethyl-ketone, and other similar fluids. Pulse-jet models are started by applying a continuous spark device (e.g. a "buzzer coil" as used on a Fordson tractor) to a spark plug in the side of the combustion chamber, and then using a bicycle pump or pressurized air to blow air across the fuel injector and into the engine. When a flammable mixture is present in the engine, it will detonate, sending a shock wave down the tail pipe and creating suction at the intake end of the engine, sucking in more fuel/air, and creates another explosion. Once started, the engine becomes hot very quickly and no longer requires the spark. The spark box and air source are disconnected and then model launched as quickly as possible to prevent the heat generated by the engine from causing the airplane to catch fire. The engine is extremely loud in operation and cannot be muffled, and can be heard for miles under the right conditions.

The propellers used for control-line models are commonly made of wood (usually maple), fiberglass-reinforced plastic (GRP), or graphite/kevlar/fiberglass and epoxy. The propeller pitch and diameter are chosen based on the engine size, type of performance desired, and cost. A typical .61-sized piped engine uses a 3-bladed propeller around 12-13" in diameter and around 4" of pitch, and is usually made of graphite/epoxy. A .20-sized sport model might use an inexpensive 8" diameter, 4" pitch propeller made of fiberglass-reinforced plastic. The graphite stunt propellers are usually made in small production runs or even by hand, and can cost as much as $50. Small GRP sport propellers are made by injection molding and may cost as little as $2.

The fuel for the engine is usually held in a metal or plastic fuel tank, shaped so that fuel is drawn from the outside edge of the tank, as the fuel tends to be thrown to the side by centrifugal force as the airplane travels in a circle. A "clunk tank" as used in R/C is satisfactory, but dedicated tanks with wedge-shaped cross-sections are frequently used and tend to have better characteristics as the fuel runs out. A tank with a vent on the inner edge, or multiple vents, is usually called a 'suction' tank. The pressure of fuel delivery with a suction tank changes as the fuel runs out, causing the engine mixture ratio to become leaner as the flight proceeds. Tanks vented to only permit air to enter at the outside edge ("uniflow" tanks) provide constant fuel pressure over the duration of the flight and a constant mixture ratio.

Combat and some speed models use rubber tubing ("bladder" tank), baby pacifiers, or fountain pen ink bladders, inflated with fuel from a large syringe, to hold the fuel under fairly high pressure. The fuel line is pinched off to prevent fuel loss until the engine is started. The high pressure of fuel delivery permits the use of a larger intake on the engine, allowing more air flow than would otherwise be possible, and thus more power. This type of fuel delivery is by far the most steady until the fuel finally runs out.

The carburetion on most control-line engines is a simple fixed-size orifice (venturi) with only a mixture ratio adjustment. The engine can be run over a very wide range of mixtures and adjusting the needle valve can be used to adjust the engine speed over a small range. Once released, the engine runs at a more-or-less constant speed until the fuel runs out, or, if equipped, the fuel-shutoff is activated. Altering the size of the venturi used can be used to adjust the gross power. Two-stroke glow motors can be made to run in a 4-stroke mode where the engine mis-fires on every other stroke, and changes mode of firing based on load of the propeller. A tremendous degree of control over how the engine runs in flight is possible by altering the fuel contents, propeller size, pitch, and pitch distribution, venturi size, compression ratio of the engine, and the length of the tuned exhaust, if used.

== Landing gear ==
The landing gear/undercarriage on control line aircraft can vary from basic piano wire and wheels to competition models with spring-loaded shock absorption and wheel pants. Retractable landing gear is common on scale models and is occasionally used in stunt. Most speed and combat models omit the landing gear in the interest of drag and weight reduction, and are launched from hand or a "dolly".

Navy carrier models have a reinforced hook to help them catch an arresting cable on a simulated carrier deck.

== Competitions ==
Competitions for control line aircraft are held in various classes. These include speed, precision aerobatics (AKA stunt), team racing, combat, naval carrier, and scale.

For competition the lines are tested before flight with a "pull test" that varies with the model weight and category to verify that the lines and control system (primarily the bellcrank and its attachment to the rest of the model) will withstand the line tension during flight.

=== Speed (F2A) ===
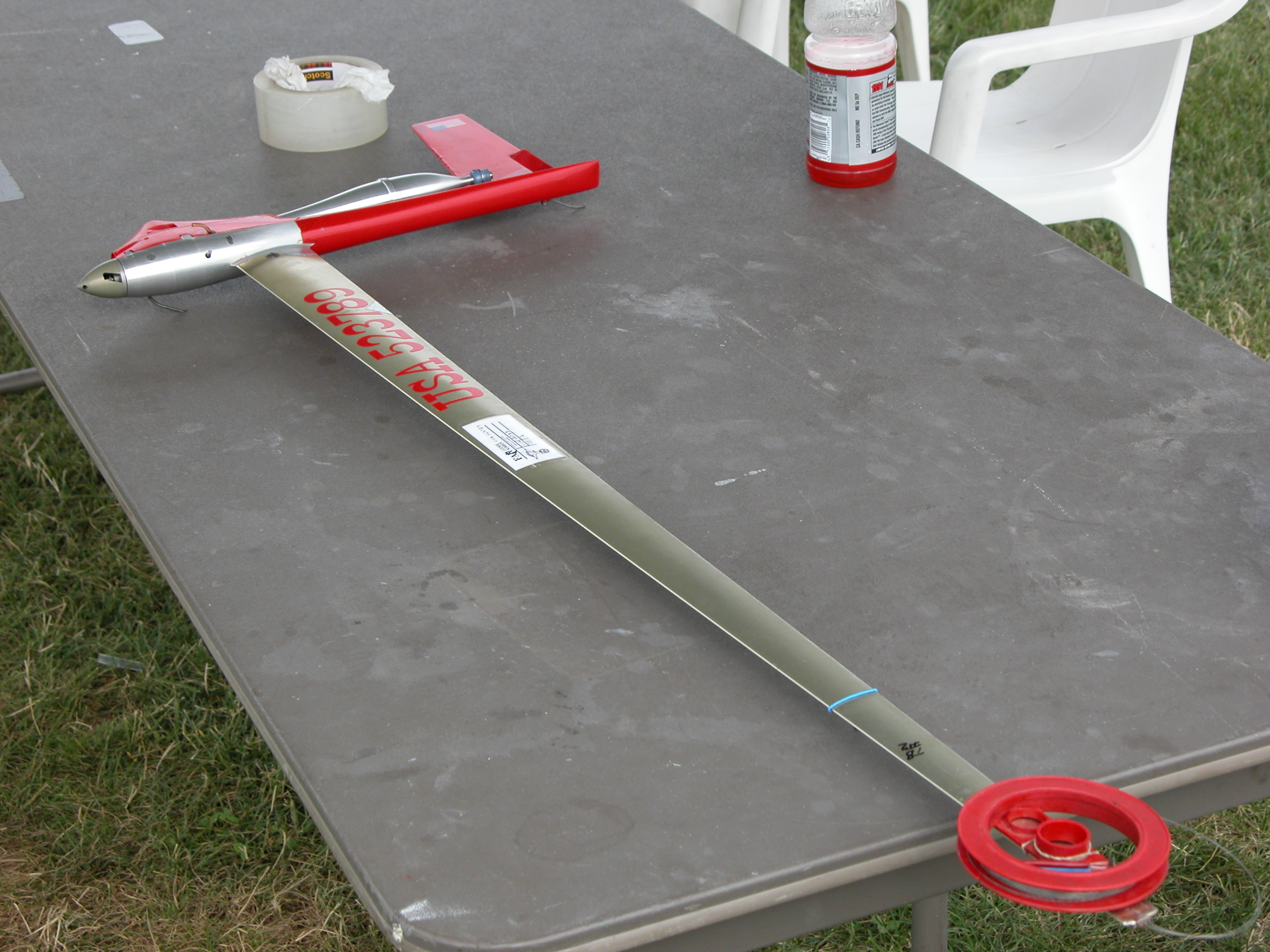
A typical FAI 0.15 cubic inches (2.5 cm^{3}) speed model - with control lines stored on reel between flights. The very long inboard wing acts as a fairing for the control lines, greatly reducing aerodynamic drag

Speed is divided up into different engine capacity classes and a Jet class (using pulse jet engines). As the name suggests, the idea is to have the model go as fast as possible. The model is timed over a number of laps, and the pilot must hold the handle controlling his model in a yoke on top of a pole in the center of the circle. This is in order to stop the pilot from assisting the model to go faster by increasing the line tension and leading the model (known as whipping). Monoline control systems are common in the US, but international classes require the use of two-line control. Speeds of the fastest models - Class D 0.60 cubic inches (9.8 cm^{3}) and Jet - have in the past exceeded 220 mph (350 km/h). Current US rules limit the speeds to <200 mph (320 km/h) by requiring the use of larger lines if 200 mph (320 km/h) is exceeded. Speed models are usually launched from a "dolly" - a cart that permits a lengthy ground roll for takeoff, but drops away in the air to reduce drag. The airplane lands on a skid or belly pan.

=== Precision aerobatics (F2B) ===
Precision aerobatics consists of flying a fixed sequence of maneuvers which are judged by a panel of judges for accuracy and precision. The event was originally dubbed "stunt" and current participants refer to it that way informally. Factors such as height of the maneuver bottoms, shapes, corner radius, and other factors are considered. The judges at large competitions are typically trained for several days on how to assess the maneuvers and apply a score. Judging well is generally considered at least as difficult as flying in competition.

Stunt models tend to be among the larger control line models, wings usually spanning from around 45–60 inches (1.1–1.5 m). Top competition models have been traditionally powered by a two-stroke engine in the 0.35 cubic inches (5.7 cm^{3}) to 0.60 cubic inches (9.8 cm^{3}) range, with four-stroke model engines and electric power also becoming popular as power sources. The airplanes, while possessing high thrust-to-weight ratios by full-scale standards (usually at least 1:1), are intended to fly quite slowly to enhance pilot control, typically around 55–60 mph (89–97 km/h), with a single lap of the circle taking around 5.5 seconds.

Engines are commonly set to increase their power output when under load. This permits low speeds but increased stability, increasing climb performance as well. The original scheme used was to take advantage of the tendency of a nominally two-stroke glow engine to change from running in a four-stroke when set with extremely rich mixtures, to running in a two-stroke when the load increases. This is called a "4-2 break". More recently, tuned exhausts have been used to provide regulation of the speed in flight. Combined with propellers of relatively low pitch, this has permitted much more control over the engine's speed and power response to maneuvering. Electric system contain feedback control system that govern the RPM of the motor to a constant value regardless of load.

Most competitive aircraft are fitted with flaps on the wings, which work in conjunction with the elevator to increase the pitch maneuverability. When up-elevator is applied, the flaps on the wings go down, and vice versa. This results in the wing, which is otherwise of a symmetrical section, to be cambered in the direction needed to enhance maneuvering. Aircraft without flaps can be flown successfully and are typically simpler, but flapped models typically fly more smoothly and can be heavier. Some of the simpler stunt models make excellent control-line trainers, as the predictable control response, low speed, and strong line tension make them easy to fly successfully.

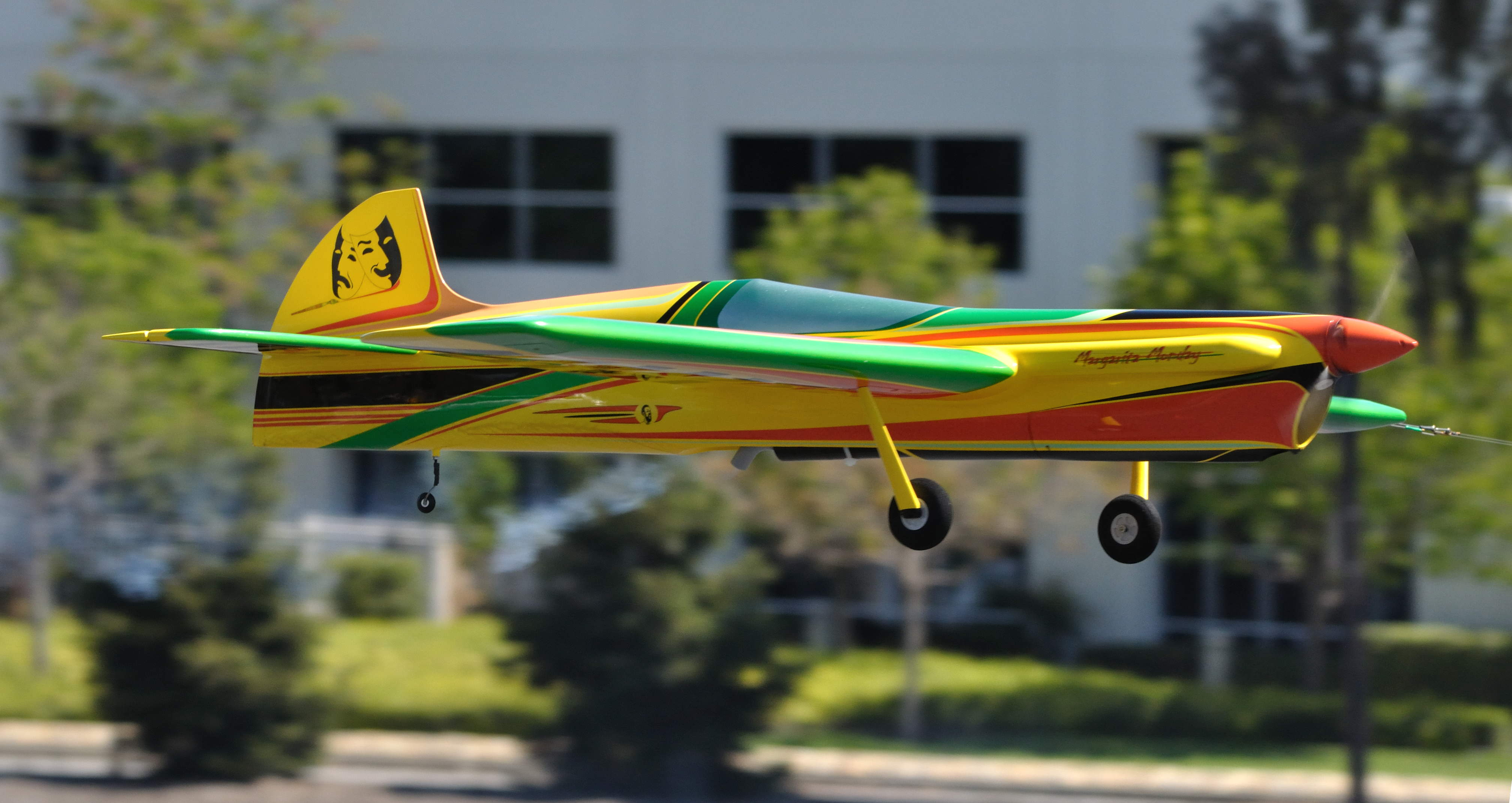
2008 Concours d'Elegance winner - Phil Granderson's "Zealot". The model received a perfect score in appearance judging.

Stunt models are often painted decoratively. Stunt rules include the appearance of the model in the score, and creating the most perfectly finished and attractive models is a competition in and of itself. A "Concours d'Elegance" award is voted on by the pilots at the Academy of Model Aeronautics' US Nationals in Muncie, Indiana for the plane with the best appearance.

Stunt is flown in many countries, with World Championships being held on alternate years. These are open for any flier who makes his or her respective national team. Competition at the highest levels (National or World Championships) can take many years or decades of practice to master the intricacies of designing, building, finishing, adjusting, and controlling the power of the airplanes, in addition to the high piloting skills. Many top competitive pilots have coaches.

Many competitions separate pilots into 4 different skill levels (beginner, intermediate, advanced and expert) allowing pilots to compete against other pilots of similar skill levels.

=== "Old time" stunt ===
Much like the "old timer" vintage design movement in free flight aeromodeling, several specialized classes of Stunt include "Old Time Stunt" where simpler maneuvers are performed with a model that was designed before a specific date (Pre 1953 per US rules) and "Classic" stunt which uses the current stunt "pattern" of maneuvers and airplanes designed prior to 1970.

=== Racing (F2C) ===
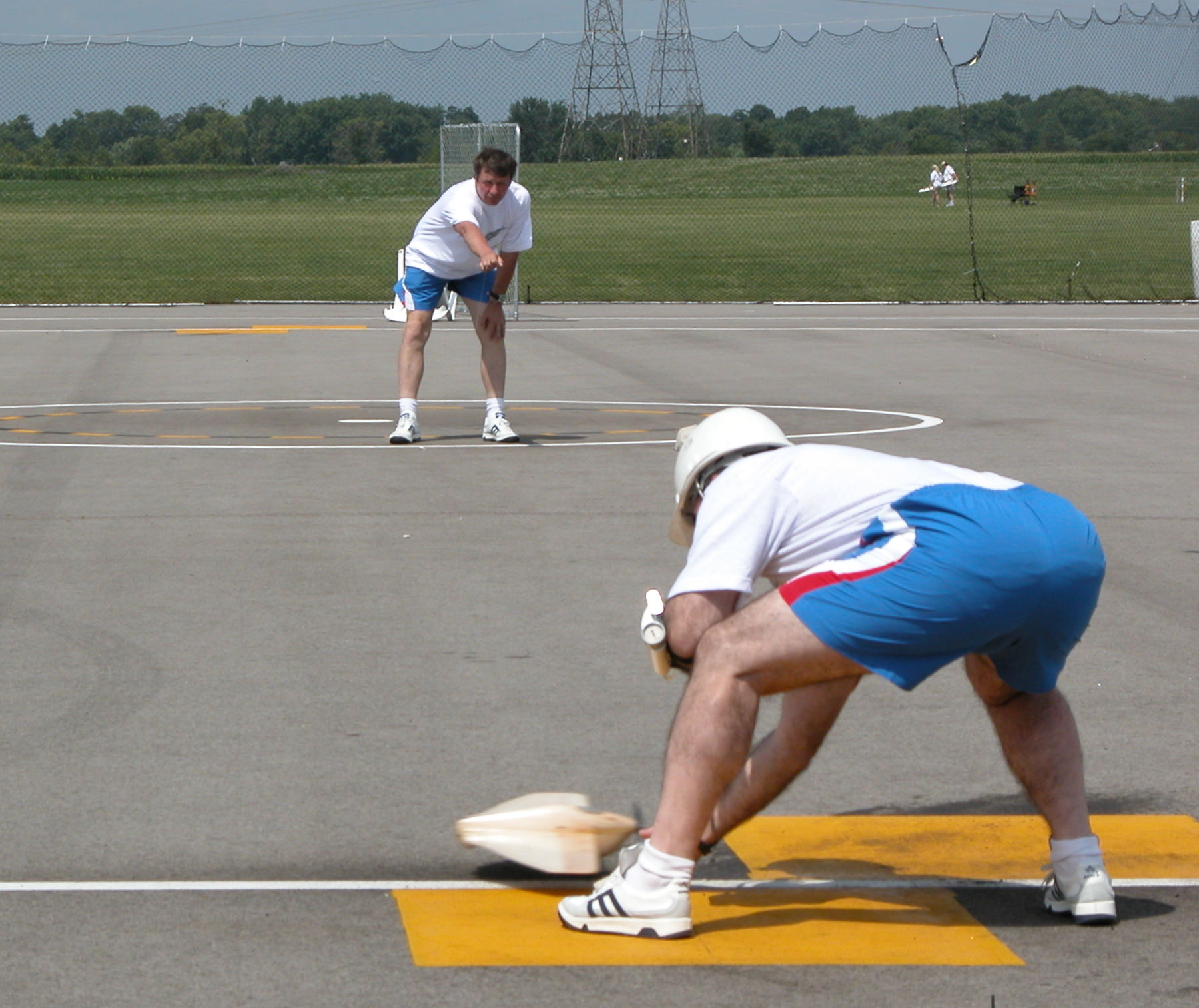
FAI Team Race model about to be caught by pit man during pit stop practice at the 2004 World Championships in Muncie, IN. Pressurized fueling tank with pressure gauge can be seen on the pitman's left arm.

Racing is an event for two-person teams—the pilot and the pit crew. There are various racing classes of various levels of difficulty: F2C (the class flown internationally and at World Championships), Goodyear (semi-scale models of 'Goodyear era' full-size racers), Vintage classes and so on.

The basic idea of all the events is that a number of models (up to three) fly together, aiming to complete a given number of laps before any of the others. The model is also required to make multiple pit stops during the race, where it is refueled, the engine restarted, and the model re-launched. This is the job of the pit crew. There are rules describing how the pilots must walk around each other, and how to pass (harder than one might think, as each model is on the end of a pair of control lines and travelling as fast as 140 mph). Pit stops require that the model be refueled and restarted - which can be a problem with a very hot racing engines. The best FAI Team Race pit stops take around 2–3 seconds for the pilot to cut the motor and land, allowing the pit-man to catch the model which only moments ago was flying at 140 mph (230 km/h), fill the tank with 7cc of model fuel from a pressurized tank, adjust the engine mixture and compression if needed, restart, and relaunch the model.

=== Combat (F2D) ===
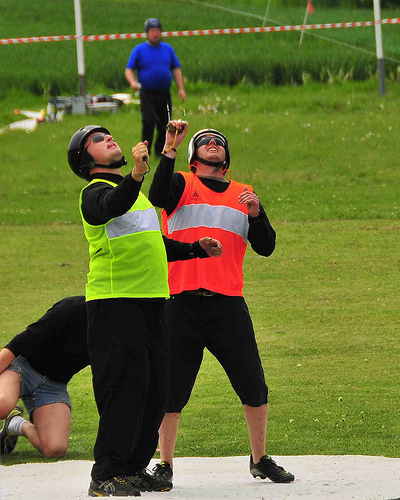
Denmark versus Australia at the Danish Combat World Cup 2008

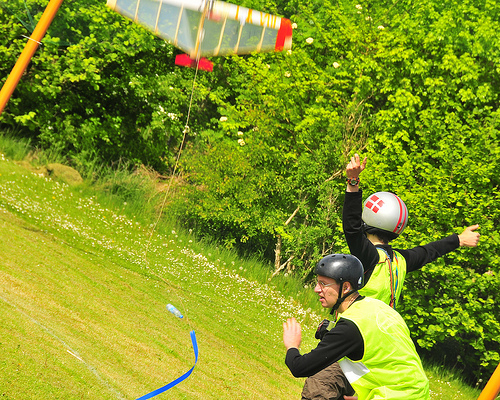
Mechanics launch an F2D combat model

Combat is an event where two pilots "dogfight" for cuts on their opponent's streamer, for a prescribed amount of time called the "Match". Models are fast and highly maneuverable typically of flying-wing types, which chase each other around the sky at speeds in excess of 100 mph (160 km/h). Despite deliberate mid-airs being banned, the carnage rate is high, and pilots commonly bring 10 or more models to a competition.

In the US there are three A.M.A. Events, which are Fast Combat (up to a .36 c.i.d. engine is allowed), Speed Limit Combat and 1/2A (up to a .051 c.i.d. engine is allowed) Combat which can be flown high or low performance. In any event where the model exceeds 75 mph, the model must be equipped with a fuel shut-off, which shuts the engine off, when the control lines are cut. Combat may be held as a kill event, or a no-kill event. A kill is scored when one competitor cuts the string that holds the streamer (of his opponent), to the plane, and is an instant win of the match. Cutting the streamer however results in an award of points. In No-Kill combat cutting the string is the same as cutting the streamer and only points are awarded. There are a lot of unofficial events held throughout the US, such as Northwest 80 mph Combat, WWII combat, Formula GX Combat, 15 Fast and the like. Combat requires perhaps the fastest reflexes of any CL event, and pilots skilled at combat typically compete well in other events like Stunt or Racing. Combat has been described as a team sport, with the pilot relying on up to a two-person pit crew. As may be imagined, with two pilots not cooperating with each other, line tangles can happen suddenly, and crash landings are common. Despite the high speed of the models, most combat models are made to be quite robust, and when time allows may hit the ground and suffer little damage and be relaunched. Although for the Speed limit events up to a .40 c.i.d. engine may be used, for the AMA fast event, there is only one manufacture of a high performance .36, that being Henry Nelson. A well-tuned and fueled Nelson 36 may achieve 25,000 r.p.m. while statically running on the ground and gain significant r.p.m. in the air. Current 1/2A engines in use are all from former soviet republics and include the Fora and Cyclon, both of which will run well above 33,000 r.p.m. In all the AMA events pressure fed fuel systems are allowed and virtually every combat plane is equipped with a fuel "Bladder". The Fuel Bladder gives the most consistent fuel feed while the aircraft is undergoing sudden and violent maneuvers, typical of flying in a match.

F2D combat - the international class for combat - is most popular in Russia and Europe, where some countries have professional or semi-professional teams. Russia and the former Soviet countries are currently the main producers of world-class equipment for this sport, including engines. Their combination of the latest engineering and design, with exotic metallurgy and experience, results in combat engines which reliably turn 32,000 rpm, and can be restarted easily in the event of a crash. Requiring lightning-fast reflexes, combat has frequently been used as a training-ground and/or hobby for many commercial and military pilots.

=== Diesel (F2E/F2F) ===
F2E diesel combat -

F2F diesel team -

=== Navy carrier ===
Navy carrier is an event where semi-scale models of real naval aircraft are flown. The event replicates the requirements of full-scale carrier aircraft, which need high speed for combat performance, and low speeds and toughness for safe carrier landings. Takeoff and landing are from a simulated aircraft carrier deck, with arrestor wires.

The aim of the flight is to complete a number of fast laps, flown as quickly as possible, followed by a number of slow laps, flown as slowly as possible. This is followed by the carrier deck landing, attempting to snag the arrestor wire. The score depends on the difference of the high and low speed, and the arrested landing. Carrier models usually have a third control line, worked by a finger trigger in the handle. This line allows the throttle setting of the engine to be controlled and the arrestor hook to be dropped. Often, a carrier model will have flaps. Unlike a stunt model, however these flaps are worked separately from the elevator. A large amount of flap is usually applied during the slow laps, and a large amount of line sweep is added to yaw the model out of the circle to maintain line tension at the very low ground speeds. Low speeds are frequently no faster than a fast walk, and when aimed into a light breeze forward motion may stop completely with the model hanging at a very high angle of attack from the propeller.

=== Scale ===
Scale is an event where an accurate scale model of a real aircraft is flown. Scoring is based on static judging of how closely the aircraft resembles the full-size prototype and on the flight performance. Extra points are often awarded for "working" features of the model, such as a retractable landing gear, droppable bombs, and other functions or operations. The number of features used to be limited by the number of lines that could be practically used to mechanically control them.

Some complex scale models use a fly-by-wire approach to allow a multitude of extra working features. A radio-control transmitter's encoder unit can be adapted, with no RF signal board present, to send its control signals along insulated control lines, instead of broadcasting them using radio frequencies. If signals are sent down the lines, the normal serial multiplexing of the control signals by such an adapted RC transmitter's encoder unit, solely sending those signals along the usual duo or trio of control lines, gets picked up by decoding gear in the model - usually adapted from an RC receiver, without an RF "front end" section - and permits many functions to be controlled without the use of additional lines. Standard servos can then be used in the model. From 2013, in the USA, the radio control "over the airwaves" of any moveable feature of control-line Scale or Carrier models (except the elevator) is permitted - this may spread to Europe and beyond in time.

== Safety ==
Control-line flying is generally quite safe when all prescribed safety measures are followed. The airplane is constrained to fly in a circle, which is generally marked. A pilots' circle is also provided, so as long as the pilot stays in the pilot's circle and everyone else is outside the outer circle, the flying model can hit no one. In most competition categories, a "safety thong" connecting the control handle to the pilot's wrist is also required, so if the pilot inadvertently releases the handle, the airplane cannot fly outside the circle (and, frequently crashes, safely for others if not the airplane, when control is lost). The lines, handle, and control system are subjected to a "pull test" before flight to ensure that they are in good shape with some significant margin. For example, the pull test is around 40 lb (18 kg) for a 4 lb (1.8 kg) Stunt model (a 10G load), and the in-flight pull is around 10 lb (4.5 kg). This provides a 2x margin of safety even if one line should fail. One failed line immediately moves the elevator to the extreme of its movement, which almost always results in a crash, safely in the circle. Other categories of model are tested in a similar way, with the loads set to correspond to the expected speeds with a safety margin around a factor of 4.

Combat models, albeit very rarely, may have their lines cut or otherwise broken by the other airplane, and can fly outside the circle. Most combat competition today requires that the airplane be equipped with a device that shuts off fuel to the engine if the lines are cut. This can work by either using the centripetal acceleration to keep the shutoff from pinching the line, or by using the line tension to hold the pinch-off device open. This way, the engine is not running and tends to decelerate very quickly instead of accelerating quickly as it would otherwise (since the drag of the lines is removed). This technique has proved to be very effective in practice. Many combat events also require the engine to be attached to the bellcrank with a cable, so that a mid-air collision will not result in the engine flying off and into the spectators. Competitors in some forms of combat competition are also required to wear helmets.

Another potential safety issue is overhead power lines. Contact with power lines, or approaching high-tension power lines, is potentially fatal and must be avoided. The use of non-metallic lines may reduce the risk of electrocution, but still a margin of 150 from the plane to power lines, is mandated in the AMA safety code.

Sometimes models with landing gear are flown by using a "stooge" that holds the airplane until released by the pilot from the center, usually with a spring-loaded pin pulled with a string. This allows a pilot to practice with no helper, and is common with stunt fliers trying to practice extensively. This has the potential to be dangerous if the pilot fails to properly reset the stooge, the wire connecting the stooge to the airplane (usually attached to the tail wheel) breaks, the stooge moves under the thrust/vibration of the engines, or the pilot's feet get tangled in the stooge release line.

The other safety issues are common with other powered model categories. Hand-starting very powerful engines, with very sharp propellers, can be quite hazardous. An electric starter can be used, but can have negative effects on the engines due to engines not being designed to take that kind of force pushing the crank shaft back. One such method is the "back-bump" method, where the engine is choked and flipped through with no battery attached to create favorable starting conditions. Once prepared, all that is necessary is to rock the engine backwards so that it coasts up to compression, and if done correctly, starts forwards. This provides time to move the hand out of the way and the fingers are not in contact with the propeller or spinner when the engine starts. Care must be taken even choking the engine as modern engines with their accurate piston/cylinder fit can "bump" or even start without the battery attached. Once the propeller is rotating, extreme care must be taken when preparing for flight and adjusting the engine. A starting accident frequently results in a small cut to the finger, but once the engine is at full speed any injury that is encountered is likely to be quite severe.

Pulse jet engines get extremely hot once started, and use very volatile fuels like gasoline or methyl-ethyl-ketone (as contrasted to relatively benign, although flammable, glow engine fuel). Contact of any type with the tailpipe of the engine is certain to result in severe burns, as the engine reaches red-hot temperatures in seconds. The airplane itself needs some sort of insulation to prevent catching fire on the ground before forward motion provides cooling air, and fully enclosed engines can set the airplane on fire after landing. The airplane should be launched as soon as possible after the engine starts to prevent heat buildup. The spark unit used for starting can also deliver a substantial electrical shock. A fire extinguisher should be at hand at all times when operating the engine. The engine is exceptionally loud when operating and should be operated with hearing protection to prevent damage.

== See also ==
- Fédération Aéronautique Internationale
- Model aircraft
- Round-the-pole flying
- Tether cars
- Cox Models
- Cox model engine
