= Model engine classes =

In the world of model aircraft there are several competition classes to signify engine displacement.

Class	Cubic Inches	Cubic Centimeters
1/2A	0.000 - 0.050	0.000 - 0.819
A	0.051 - 0.1525	0.835 - 2.499
B	0.1526 - 0.300	2.500 - 4.916
C	0.301 - 0.650	4.932 - 10.65
FAI	max 1.526	max 25
Jet		
