= Paper plane =

Toy aircraft made of folded paper

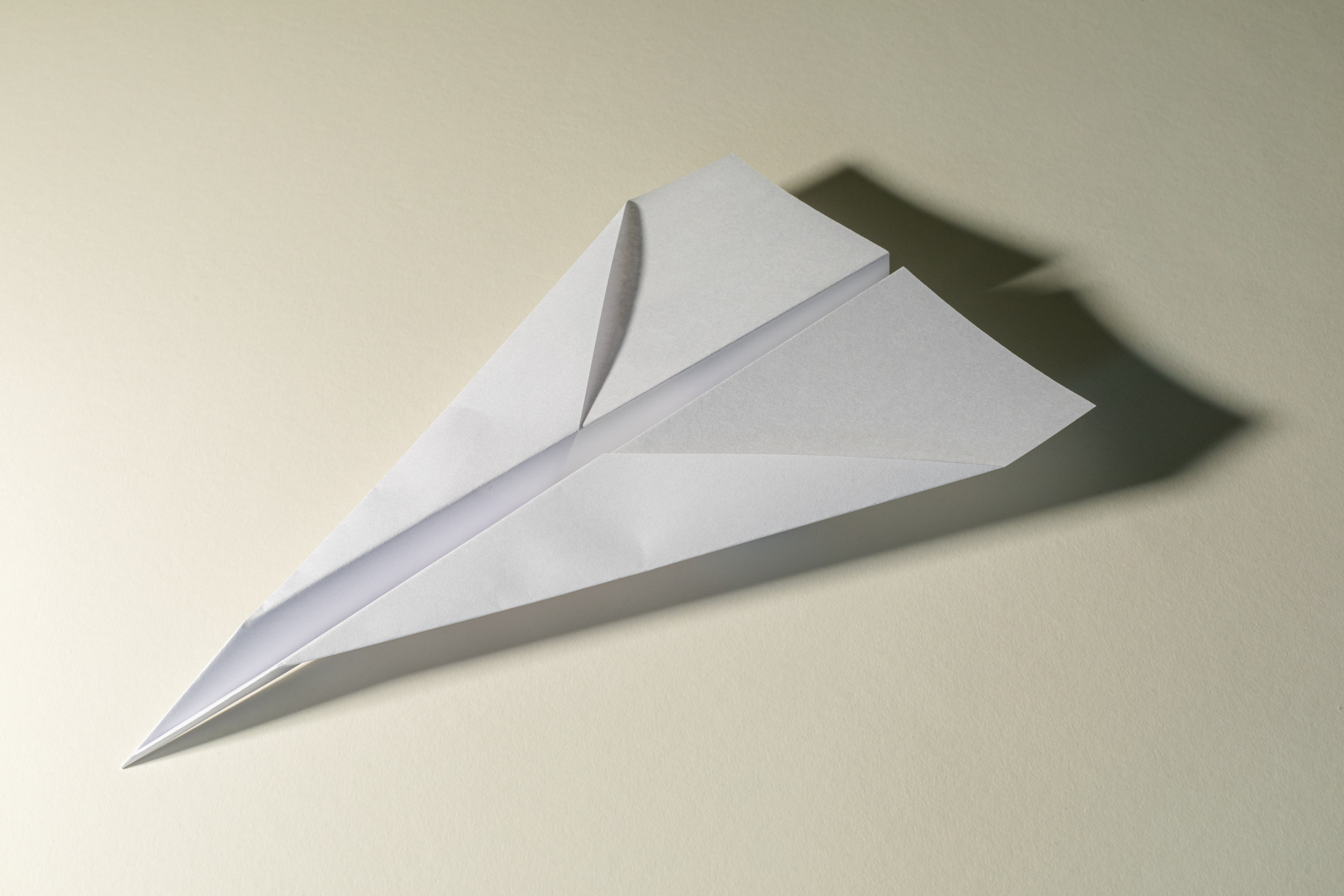
A simple folded paper plane

A paper plane (also known as a paper airplane or paper dart in American English, or paper aeroplane in British English) is a toy aircraft, usually a glider, made out of a single folded sheet of paper or paperboard. It typically takes the form of a simple nose-heavy triangle thrown like a dart.

== History ==
Paper airplanes are known to have been made as far back as the mid 19th century, based on an American children's book describing their construction from 1864.

The construction of a paper airplane, by Ludwig Prandtl at the 1924 banquet of the International Union of Theoretical and Applied Mechanics, was dismissed as an artless exercise by Theodore von Kármán:

Prandtl was also somewhat impulsive. I recall that on one occasion at a rather dignified dinner meeting following a conference in Delft, Holland, my sister [Josephine], who sat next to him at the table, asked him a question on the mechanics of flight. He started to explain; in the course of it he picked up a paper menu and fashioned a small model airplane, without thinking where he was. It landed on the shirtfront of the French Minister of Education, much to the embarrassment of my sister and others at the banquet.

Over time, paper model aircraft have gained design improvements in velocity, lift, propulsion, style, and fashion.

== Advanced paper gliders ==
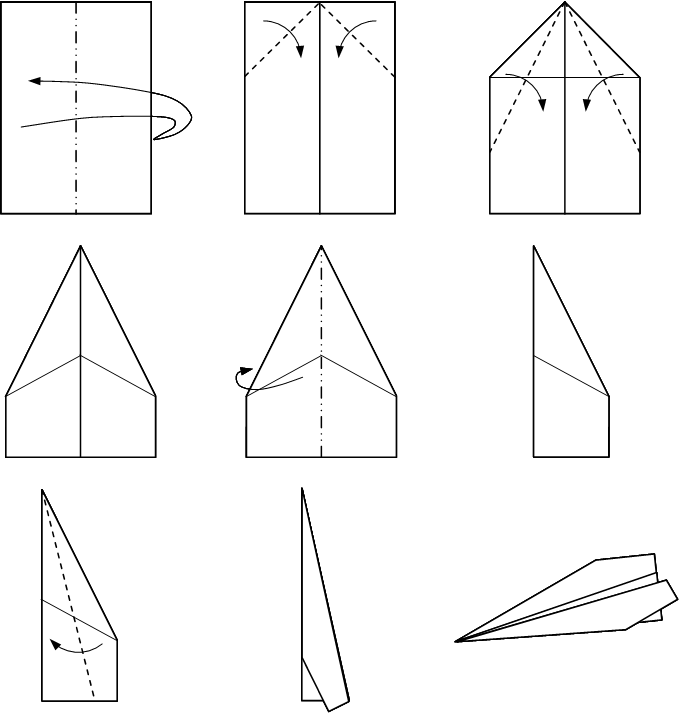
Folding instructions for a traditional classic dart

=== Developments ===
Paper gliders have experienced three forms of development in the period 1930–1988:

- High flight performance
- Scale modeling
- Use of CAD software

Ongoing development of folded/origami gliders over the same period has seen similar sophistication, including the addition of the following construction refinements

- Increased fold-count, sometimes of an intricate nature
- Explicit kirigami (cutting of paper) as a component of design
- Requirements for additional ballast to ensure flight performance

=== Technological introductions ===
Technology responsible for the proliferation of advanced paper plane construction:

- Inexpensive CAD software for 2D part design
- Widespread manufacture, and inexpensive nature of acetal air-annealed glues, e.g. Bostik Clear-bond.
- Inexpensive ink and laser computer printers, for accurate aircraft part reproduction
- The advent of the Internet, and widespread information sharing

=== Material considerations ===
Compared to balsa wood — another material commonly used to fabricate model planes — paper's density is higher; consequentially, conventional origami paper gliders (see above) suffer from higher drag, as well as imperfectly aerodynamic wing chords.

However, unlike balsa gliders, paper gliders have a far higher strength-to-thickness ratio: a sheet of office-quality 80 g/m^{2} photocopier/laser printer paper, for example, has approximate in-scale strength of aircraft-grade aluminium sheet metal, while card stock approximates the properties of steel at the scale of paper model aircraft.

=== Directions in advanced paper aircraft design ===
Unmodified origami paper aircraft have very poor glide ratios, often not better than 7.5:1 depending on construction and materials. Modification of origami paper gliders can lead to marked improvements in flight performance, at the cost of weight and often with the inclusion of aerodynamic and/or structural compromises. Often, increases in wing loading can encourage breakdown of laminar flow over a wing with a hybrid of origami and glued and taped construction.

Professors Ninomiya and Mathews developed more directed design strategies in the late 1960s and the 1980s. Previously, paper model aircraft had been designed without an emphasis on performance in flight. By using aerodynamic design, and fluid dynamics, both professors were able to design models that exceeded previous flight performance criteria by a very wide margin. Ranges of flight increased from the typical 10+ meters to 85+ meters, depending on energy input into the gliders on launch.

At present, the work of the two professors remains the last research work on improving the flight performance of paper model gliders. Collaborative work by enthusiasts through online forums and personal websites are mostly developments of these original glider types.

In the field of scale model design, there are at present many possibilities for advanced design. Profile gliders encounter a limitation for improvement of flight performance based on their wing types, which are typically curved-plate aerofoils. In addition, fuselages are either balsa-paper or paper laminates, prone to warping or breakage over a very short time. Improvement in performance is possible through modelling three-dimensional fuselages which encourage laminar flow, and in internally braced wings which can then have high-lift aerofoil profiles, such as the Clark Y or NACA 4 or 6 series, for high lift.

=== White Wings ===
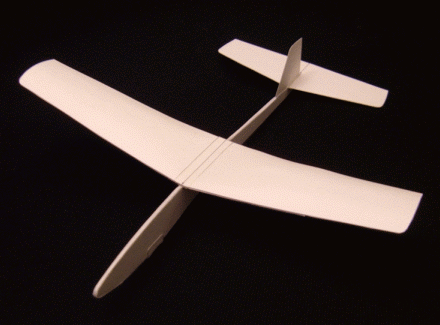
Ninomiya's "N-424" design from Jet Age Jamboree (1966). The glider fuselage is constructed from several laminations of paper glued together. The wings are of two laminations, and the tailplane and tailfin of a single lamination.

In Japan in the late 1960s, Professor Yasuaki Ninomiya designed an advanced type of paper aircraft, which were published in two books, Jet Age Jamboree (1966) and Airborne All-Stars (1967). Designs from these books were later sold as the 'White Wings' Series of paper glider packs from the 1970s to the present day.

White Wings are a stark departure from conventional paper aircraft, in that their fuselages and wings are paper templates cut and glued together. They were designed with the aid of low-speed aerodynamic engineering design principles. Construction of the models is of Kent paper, a grade of cartridge paper sold in Japan.

The early models were explicitly hand drawn, but by the 1980s these had their parts drafted with the use of CAD software.

Ninomiya's designs also included, for the first time in any paper model, working propellers driven by airflow, in particular for his profile scale models of the Cessna Skymaster and Piaggio P.136 of 1967. Noteworthy as well was the careful design of gliders so that they could fly without ballast – his F-4 Phantom II model is able to be flown immediately without recourse to paperclips, etc.

The high performance gliders have fuselages that are kept rigid by the use of a balsa fuselage profile bonded to the paper components. The paper used is quite heavy, approximately twice the weight of standard drawing cartridge paper, but lighter than lightweight cardboard. Original White Wings were entirely paper, requiring patience and skill. Later however, balsa-wood fuselages were used, and White Wings were sold "pre-cut", making construction easier. The aerofoil used is a Göttingen 801 (curved plate), and a pattern is supplied as a cutout part of each kit.

=== Paper Pilot ===
In 1984, Professor E.H. Mathews, lecturer in Thermodynamics at the University of the Witwatersrand, South Africa published his first compendium of high-performance model aircraft. This book was Paper Pilot (Struik, 1984). This book was very successful, leading to additional volumes, Paper Pilot 2 (1988), Paper Pilot 3 (1991), 12 Planes for the Paper Pilot (1993) and Ju 52, a stand-alone book featuring a scale model. Unpublished models include an Airbus A320 scale model much like the Ju 52, seen on the Tekkies youth program in 1996.

The books featured patterns of parts printed on lightweight cardstock, to give the aircraft good flight penetration performance for long-distance flight.

Public interest in the gliders, and their publishing success, allowed some of the development to be broadcast on South African television during 1988 on the first book's release, and again 1993, to coincide with a national paper aeroplane competition tied to Paper Pilot 3's release. Aerodynamic design of the gliders was achieved making use of an optimised small wind tunnel - the flat-glider Britten Norman Trislander was filmed in this facility, with weight balances being used to demonstrate the optimisation of flight. The design of parts of the gliders was achieved using Autodesk AutoCAD R12, then the most advanced version of this CAD software, and one of the first publicly available paper model aeroplanes designed using this technology.

Construction of the gliders closely parallels that used in the White Wings series of gliders of Dr. Ninomiya for flat gliders. Later gliders with three-dimensional fuselages use a lightweight construction optimised for flight performance. Innovations include functional wheeled undercarriage which does not contribute to the drag budget while permitting good landings.

Paper pilot gliders make use a curved-plate aerofoil shape for best performance. Their design, like the White Wings gliders, is very sensitive to trim, and in fact have the capacity to make indoor flights in confined spaces under average conditions. Most in initial editions are equipped with catapult hook patterns, and demonstrate an ability to fly the length of a Rugby pitch when so launched.

Later editions and gliders were equipped with a bungee hook, the construction of which was included in Paper Pilot 3 and 12 Planes for the Paper Pilot. The bungee system publish parallels, at a smaller scale, the practice used in radio controlled and full-size sailplane launches, at a fraction of the cost and complexity. To date, this is the only known example of such a launch system applied to a paper model aeroplane type published in book form. Flight performance on bungee is very good - one glider in particular, a scale model U-2 (in the last book of the series) had demonstrated flight performance in excess of 120 meters, on bungee hook launch.

=== Paper helicopters (autogyros) ===
The world's first known published paper autogyro (engineless helicopter) by Richard K Neu appeared in "The Great International Paper Airplane Book" published in 1967. Its wings fly in a circle around a central ballast shaft as it descends vertically. This basic design has been published several times and is widely known.

The world's first known published forward-gliding paper autogyro with forward-pointing body lifted by spinning blades was built by James Zongker. It appears on page 53 of "The Paper Airplane Book: The Official Book of the Second Great International Paper Airplane Contest" published in 1985 by Science Magazine. Its twin contra-rotating blades automatically spin on paper axles upon launch to provide lift.

E.H. Mathews developed a flight-stable paper model helicopter known as the Papercopter. This has a ring wing, and flaps for adjusting for flight for stability, positioned on the inboard edge of the ring. While not an autogyro per se, this paper model aircraft class falls within the general design of a paper model helicopter, and does possess a rotational flight element producing lift during forward flight. Papercopters, as Professor Mathews labeled them, are unique among paper model rotorcraft in having a range and velocity far in excess of all other classes, able to fly quite quickly, and with a range of between 10 and 15 m. The longest flight time is 27.9 seconds.

=== World records ===
There are multiple goals for a flight:

- Distance (javelin throwing).
- Time aloft (javelin throwing straight up with subsequent metamorphosis into a sailplane).
- Aerobatic.
- Stable flight to understand flight mechanics of a good plane.

For every goal there is a typical plane and sometimes a world record.

A contest-winning paper glider

There have been many attempts over the years to break the barriers of throwing a paper plane for the longest time aloft and distance.

==== Time aloft ====
Ken Blackburn held this Guinness World Record for 13 years (1983–1996) and had regained the record in October 1998 by keeping his paper plane aloft for 27.6 seconds (indoors). This was confirmed by Guinness officials and a CNN report. The paper plane that Blackburn used in this record breaking attempt was a "glider". As of October 2026, the world record for most airtime a paper plane has is held by Rao Chongyi, Wang Chenghao, Tang Shuai, Liu Liwen, Yang Shian, Jia Siyi, and Pan Zichened on 11 February 2026 in Kunshan, China. keeping their paper plane aloft for 31.2 seconds. The current distance record, as of February 2023, is 88.318 m (298 ft 9 in) achieved by Dillon Ruble (USA), with the support of Nathaniel Erickson and Garrett Jensen (both USA) in Crown Point, Indiana, USA, on 2 December 2022.

==== Distance ====
Stephen Kreiger held the record for distance from 2003 with a throw of 207 feet 4 inches (63.20 m). After more than nine years, the record was broken in 2012 by Joe Ayoob, who threw a paper airplane 226 feet 10 inches (69.14 m). The aircraft was designed by John Collins, known as "Paper Airplane Guy". The record stood for over ten years until Kim Kyu Tae set a new record of 252 feet 7 inches (76.99 m) in 2022 with an aircraft designed by Shin Moo Joon and Chee Yie Jian (Julian). On 28 December 2025, the record was broken again when Liu Liwen threw a paper airplane 98.43 metres (322.9 feet) indoors in Shanghai, China, using an aircraft developed after more than six months of testing and refinement.

==== Rules ====
The rules for the Guinness world record for paper air planes are:

- A4 paper
- Max density of 100 g/m squared
- 25mm×30mm of tape allowed

== Aerodynamics ==
=== General aerodynamics ===
Paper aircraft are a class of model plane, and so do not experience aerodynamic forces differently from other types of flying model. However, their construction material produces a number of dissimilar effects on flight performance in comparison with aircraft built from different materials.

In general, there are four aerodynamic forces that act on the paper aircraft while it is in flight:

- Thrust, which keeps the plane moving forward;
- Aerodynamic lift, acting on horizontal surface areas that lifts the plane upward;
- Weight, which counteracts lift and pulls the plane downward; and
- Air drag, which counteracts thrust and reduces the plane's forward speed.

Altogether, the aerodynamic forces co-interact, creating turbulence that amplifies small changes in the surface of the paper aircraft. Modifications can be made to most paper airplanes by bending, curving or making small cuts in the trailing edges of wings and in the airplane's tail, if it has one.

The most common adjustments, modelled after glider aircraft, are dihedral angle, ailerons, elevators, and rudders.

==== Critical Re ====
The Reynolds number (Re) range of the paper model aircraft is reasonably wide:

- 2,000–12,000 for Origami aircraft
- 4,000–16,900 for Compound Origami (involving adhesives and aerodynamic refinements)
- 9,000–39,000 for Profile Performance (White Wings, Paper Pilot, et al.)
- 19,200–56,000 for Scale Performance (White Wings, Paper Pilot, et al.)
- 22,000–93,000 for Scale Models (complex structures)

These ranges are indicative. As noted above the mass: density ratio of paper prevents performance from reaching those of balsa models in terms of expressions of power to weight, but for models with wingspans of between 250 mm and 1,200 mm, the critical Re is very similar to balsa model gliders of similar dimensions.

Paper models typically have a wing aspect ratio that is very high (model sailplanes) or very low (the classic paper dart), and therefore are in almost all cases flying at velocities far below their wing planform and aerofoil critical Re, where flow would break down from laminar to turbulent.

Most origami paper darts tend to be flying within turbulent air in any case, and as such, are important to research into turbulent flow as are low-Re lifting surfaces found in nature such as leaves of trees and plants as well as the wings of insects.

High performance profile and scale models do approach their wing section's critical Re in flight, which is a noteworthy achievement in terms of paper model design. Performance is derived of the fact that these gliders are in fact performing as well as it is possible for them to perform, given their material limitations.

Experiments in different material finishes in recent years have revealed some interesting relationships in Re and paper models. Performance of origami and compound origami structures improves markedly with the introduction of smooth paper, though this is also aided by the paper's higher mass and consequently better penetration.

More marginal performance and scale types generally do not benefit from heavier, shinier surfaces. Performance profile-fuselage types do experience somewhat improved performance if shiny, slippery paper is used in construction, but although there is a velocity improvement, this is offset very often by a poorer life-to-drag ratio. Scale types have experience negative performance at the addition of heavy shiny papers in their construction.

==== Aerofoils ====
Wing profile sections in models vary, depending on type:

- Origami : Göttingen flat-plate, or Jedelsky-form for folded leading edges.
- Compound Origami: Identical with origami, though often with sealed edges – 45% improvement in Cd.
- Profile Performance: Göttingen curved-plate, with profile similar to Göttingen 801.
- Scale Performance: Göttingen 801 or any other wing aerofoil
- Scale Models: This varies on model type (see below)

Camber of profiles varies, too. In general, the lower the Re, the greater the camber. Origami types will have 'ludicrous' or very high cambers in comparison with more marginally performing scale types, whose escalating masses demand higher flying speeds and so lower induced drag from high camber, though this will vary depending on type being modelled.

In the case of scale performance and scale models, the modellers intent will define the type of aerofoil section chosen. WWI biplanes, if designed for flight performance, will often have curved-plate aerofoils, as these produce a highly cambered surfaces and Coefficient of Lift (Cl) for low gliding airspeeds. WWII monoplanes will often have very scale-like sections, though with increased trailing edge droop to improve camber in comparison with scale counterparts.

Similarly, size, airspeed and mass will have very big impacts on choice of aerofoil, though this is a universal consideration in model plane design, no matter the material.

==== Origami Flying Wings ====
The former Guinness world record holder Tim Richardson disagrees with the decision to put a 'tail' on the paper plane. His explanation of paper plane aerodynamics on his website mentions that the tail is not needed. He uses the real-life B-2 Spirit flying wing bomber as an example, stating that the weights along the wing should be put forward in order to stabilize the plane. (Note: paper planes do not need a tail primarily because they typically have a large, thin fuselage, which acts to prevent yaw, and wings along the entire length, which prevents pitch.)

Independently, Edmond Hui invented a Stealth Bomber-like paper plane called the Paperang in 1977, based on hang glider aerodynamics. Uniquely, it has properly controlled airfoil sections, high-aspect-ratio wings, and a construction method designed to allow the builder to vary every aspect of its shape. It was the subject of a book, "Amazing Paper Airplanes" in 1987, and a number of newspaper articles in 1992. It is ineligible for most paper plane competitions due to the use of a staple, but it has extremely high gliding performance exceeding glide ratios of 12 to 1 with good stability.

In 1975, origami artist Michael LaFosse designed a pure origami (one sheet; no cutting, glue or staples...) flying wing, which he named the "Art Deco Wing".Though its aerodynamic form mimics some hang glider and supersonic airfoils, its invention evolved from exploring the beauty of folded paper first. Its glide ratio and stability are on a par with many of the best paper wing constructions that use glue, tape or staples. This design was first published in 1984 in the book "Wings and Things", by Stephen Weiss, St. Martin's Press.

Although it is a common view that light paper planes go farther than heavy ones, this is considered to be untrue by Blackburn. Blackburn's record-breaking 20-year-old paper plane was based on his belief that the best planes had short wings and are "heavy" at the point of the launch phase in which the thrower throws the paper plane into the air, and at the same time longer wings and a "lighter" weight would allow the paper plane to have better flight times but this cannot be thrown hard with much pressure into the air as a "heavy" weighted launch phase. According to Blackburn, "For maximum height and for a good transition to gliding flight, the throw must be within 10 degrees of vertical" — which shows that a speed of at least 60 miles per hour (97 kilometres per hour) is the amount needed to throw the paper plane successfully.

After the folding there are still gaps between different layers of folded paper (tearoff edge). These and the kinks transversal to the airflow may have a detrimental effect on aerodynamics, especially on the upper side of the wing. In some models the surfaces are not aligned to the direction of flow acting as airbrakes. Typically the center of mass is at 1/81 and the center of area is at 1/2 of the plane length. Two methods exist to shift the center of mass to the front. One rolls up the leading edge which then stays unswept. The other uses a swept wing or axial folding to produce something like a fuselage extending out of leading edge of the wing.

==== Other designs ====
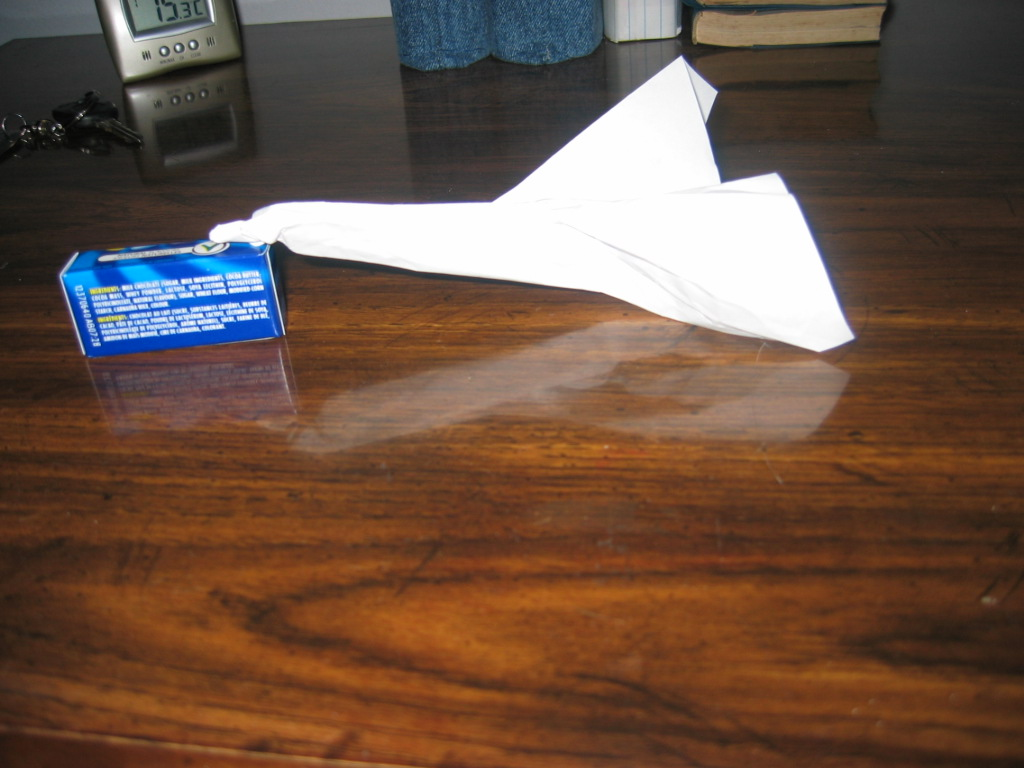
An example of an asymmetrical custom paper airplane, which exhibits large torque due to unbalanced forces on the wings. The flight path assumes a somewhat parabolic shape, before descending in a rapid counter-clockwise spiral, as viewed from behind.

It is possible to create freestyle versions of paper aircraft, which often exhibit an unusual flight path compared to more traditional paper darts, jets and gliders. Another propulsion technique, creating high launch velocities, involves the use of elastic bands for "catapults". Walkalong gliding involves the continuous propulsion of paper airplane designs (such as the tumblewing, follow foil and paper airplane surfer) by soaring flight on the edge of a sheet of cardboard.

== Space flight ==
There may one day be a paper plane launched from space. A prototype passed a durability test in a wind tunnel in March 2008, and Japan's space agency JAXA considered a launch from the International Space Station. However, the plane developers, Takuo Toda (see World Records above) and fellow enthusiast Shinji Suzuki, an aeronautical engineer and professor at Tokyo University, postponed the attempt after acknowledging it would be all but impossible to track them during the planes' week-long journey to Earth, assuming any of them survived the searing descent. The developers were hoping that China or Russia will back further efforts on the project.

In February 2011, 200 planes were launched from a net underneath a weather balloon 23 miles (37 km) above Germany. The planes were designed to maintain stable flight even in gusts up to 100 mph (160 km/h). The planes were equipped with memory chips from which data could be uploaded, and were reported as having been found in other places in Europe, as well as Canada, India, South Africa and Australia. A spokesman for the project said he was "bit suspicious" of reports from the southern hemisphere, but said that planes reaching America was possible given the "substantial" winds encountered by the planes, and the fact that a well-built paper plane "travels 12 feet across the ground for every foot it drops".

On 24 June 2015, a club from Kesgrave High School in Suffolk, United Kingdom, achieved the world record for the highest altitude paper plane launch, reaching an altitude of 35,043 metres (114,970 ft).

== See also ==
- Card throwing
- FPG-9 glider made from a styrofoam plate
- Kline Fogleman airfoil
- Model aircraft
- National Paper Airplane Day
- OSU PG-I, a full-sized paper airplane
- Paper Aircraft Released Into Space
- Paper Planes (2015 film)
- Red Bull Paper Wings
- Tumblewing
- Walkalong glider
- Sypaq Corvo Precision Payload Delivery System

== Notable books ==
- Jet Age Jamboree, Dr. Yasuaki Ninomiya, 1966.
- The Great International Paper Airplane Book, by Jerry Mander, George Dippel and Howard Gossage; 1967,1988
- Airborne All-Stars, Dr. Yasuaki Ninomiya, 1967.
- Whitewings: Excellent Paper Airplanes, by Dr. Yasuaki Ninomiya; AGCO Ltd., Osako, Japan, 1980.
- Advanced Paper Aircraft, by Campbell Morris; Angus & Robertson (Harper Collins), Sydney, Australia, 1983.
- The Ultimate Paper Airplane, by Richard Kline; Fireside Book, New York, 1985.
- Paper Pilot, by E.H. Mathews, Struik, Johannesburg, 1987
- Paper Pilot 2, by E.H. Mathews, Struik, Johannesburg, 1990
- Paper Pilot 3, by E.H. Mathews, Struik, Johannesburg, 1992
- 12 Planes for the Paper Pilot, by E.H. Mathews, Struik, Johannesburg, 1995
- Paper Airplanes, by Richard Slade, 1972 (Scale Model Aircraft)
- The Know How Book of Paper Aeroplanes, Know How Series, Usborne Books, London, 1979
- The Gliding Flight, by John M. Collins, Ten Speed Press, 1989
- Fantastic Flight, by John M. Collins, Ten Speed Press, 2004
- Super Simple Paper Airplanes, by Nick Robinson, Sterling, 2005
- The Biggest Ever Book of Paper Planes, by Nick Robinson, Ivy Press, 2009
- Amazing Paper Airplanes, by Kyong Hwa Lee, UNM Press, 2016
