= Ken Blackburn =

Ken Blackburn may refer to:

- Ken Blackburn (aeronautical engineer) (born 1963), American paper airplane pioneer
- Ken Blackburn (actor) (born 1935), New Zealand actor and writer
- Ken Blackburn (footballer) (born 1951), English football forward (Brighton & Hove Albion)
