= Paper Wings =

Paper Wings may refer to:

== Music ==
- Paper Wings, a 2005 album by Cauterize, a band that included Chuck Coles
- Paper Wings, a composition by Jake Heggie from The Faces of Love: The Songs of Jake Heggie, 1999
- "Paper Wings", a song by Barclay James Harvest from Everyone Is Everybody Else, 1974
- "Paper Wings", a song by Gillian Welch from Revival, 1996
- "Paper Wings", a song by Little Auk from the film North Sea Texas, 2011
- "Paper Wings", a song by Rise Against from Siren Song of the Counter Culture, 2004
- "Paper Wings", a song by Staind from Staind, 2011

== Other uses ==
- Paper Wings, a 2014 poetry collection by Maureen Duffy
- Paper Wings (Différence d'altitude), a short film by Vincent Toi
- Red Bull Paper Wings, the official paper plane world championship which is held by Red Bull under the rules developed by the Paper Aircraft Association.
