= Paper planes launched from space =

Several projects have been planned and undertaken to launch paper planes from the stratosphere or higher.

The Guinness World Record for the highest altitude paper plane launch is 35,043 metres (114,970 ft).

== 2008 Japanese project ==
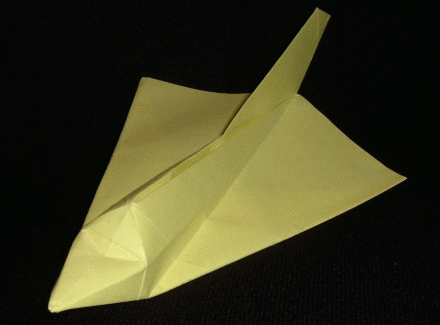
Origami paper plane designed by Takuo Toda

Japanese scientists and origami masters considered in 2008 launching a flotilla of paper planes from space. The launch was tentatively slated for 2009 from the International Space Station 250 miles above Earth. However, the planes' developers, Takuo Toda (see paper plane world records) and fellow enthusiast Shinji Suzuki, an aeronautical engineer and professor at Tokyo University, postponed the attempt after acknowledging it would be all but impossible to track the planes during their week-long journey to Earth, assuming any of them survived the searing descent. The developers continued through 2009, with hopes that China or Russia would back further efforts on the project.

Some 30 to 100 planes had been considered to make the descent, each gliding downward over what was expected to be the course of a week to several months. If one of the planes survived to Earth it would have made the longest flight ever by a paper plane, traversing the 250 miles (400 km) vertical descent. In a test in Japan in February 2008, a prototype about 7 centimetres (2.8 in) long and 5 centimetres (2.0 in) wide (reported by other sources as 30 centimetres (12 in)) survived Mach 7 speeds and temperatures reported to be 230 °C (446 °F) in a hypersonic wind tunnel for 10 seconds. Materials designed for use in conventional reentry vehicles, including ceramic composites, withstand temperatures on the order of 2,200 °C (3,990 °F). The planes were to have been made from heat-resistant paper treated with silicon.

As the Japanese/JAXA project was outlined, scientists would have had no way to track the airplanes or to predict where they might land; and as 70% of the Earth's surface is covered in water, the craft would have anticipated a wet reunion with the planet. Each plane, however, would have borne a request in several languages asking its finder to contact the Japanese team. Should one of the airplanes thus have made its way home, its journey would have helped to demonstrate the feasibility of slow-speed, low-friction atmospheric reentry. Critics have suggested that even a successful demonstration would lack probative impact beyond the realm of diminutive sheets of folded paper—they can only fall. Supporters countered that the broadening of knowledge was justification enough.

== PARIS project ==
On 28 October 2010, the PARIS (Paper Aircraft Released Into Space) project launched a paper plane at 90,000 ft (27,000 m) - 17 miles up - at a location about 120 miles (190 km) west of Madrid, Spain, setting a world record recognised by Guinness World Records. The work was undertaken by a team of British space enthusiasts working on behalf of the information technology web site The Register.

The use of the word "space" in the project's name refers to "near space", not "outer space", since it was not planned for the vehicle to ascend to an altitude above the Kármán line.

== Other projects ==
In February 2011, Project Space Planes launched 200 planes from a net underneath a weather balloon twenty-three miles above Germany. The planes were designed to maintain stable flight even in gusts up to 100 miles per hour (160 km/h). The planes were equipped with memory chips from which data could be uploaded. Planes were subsequently recovered from Europe, North America and Australia.

On 13 September 2014, a group of Civil Air Patrol cadets from Fox Valley Composite Squadron of the Illinois Wing announced that it had broken the Guinness World Record for the highest launch of a paper plane by releasing a substantial paper dart at 96,563 ft (29,432 m).

On 24 June 2015, a secondary school science club from Elsworth, Cambridgeshire, UK, achieved the world record for the highest altitude paper plane launch, reaching an altitude of 35,043 metres (114,970 ft).

On 27 July 2019, Japanese startup Interstellar Technologies Inc. launched sounding rocket MOMO-F4 with number of payloads including three origami paper planes made out of heat resistant paper. These paper planes by paper-plane enthusiast Takuo Toda were supposed to be released at the planned 100 km apogee, but due to anomalies the MOMO-F4 sounding rocket could only achieve 13 km altitude and crashed into the ocean.

On 5 September 2024, three paper planes, one of which was equipped with a radiosonde, were launched from Italy using a weather balloon. The launch reached an altitude of 41,889 meters. The telemetry plane landed in the sea after 1 hour and 59 minutes of flight. One of the other two paper planes was found a week later.

== See also ==
- Space debris
- Paper airplane
