= PFY (disambiguation) =

PFY may refer to:

- Pimply-Faced Youth, a character in the Bastard Operator From Hell series
- Poulton-le-Fylde railway station, England, station code
- Pel-Air airline, ICAO code
