= Tech tabloid =

A Tech tabloid is a type of news media that mainly concentrates on technology news: science, IT, semiconductors, telecoms and related issues, but also takes on a less formal and more humorous approach than traditional technology publications such as EE Times or EDN. They are professional in nature, though, rather than community-based technology news sites such as Digg or Slashdot.

== Tabloid nature ==
Tabloid newspapers traditionally aim for sensationalist stories, celebrity news and aim for a down-market reader. The tabloid tag does not apply to the paper format, as many of these publications are web-only, such as The Inquirer and The Register.

The sarcastic, iconoclastic and skeptic tones of these publications is often more akin to publication such as Private Eye, which would not usually be labelled a tabloid, than to the Page Three tabloid such as The Sun and the Daily Star.

The Inquirer even, in its 20000th article, refers to itself as "redtop tabloid rags like the INQUIRER", later in the same article calling itself "cheesy": determining the irony of this is left as an exercise to the reader. Both the Register and the Inquirer do generally have red banners at the top of their home pages.
