= Supersonic airfoils =

Type of aerodynamic surface

A supersonic airfoil is a cross-section geometry designed to generate lift efficiently at supersonic speeds. The need for such a design arises when an aircraft is required to operate consistently in the supersonic flight regime.

Supersonic airfoils generally have a thin section formed of either angled planes or opposed arcs (called "double wedge airfoils" and "biconvex airfoils" respectively), with very sharp leading and trailing edges. The sharp edges prevent the formation of a detached bow shock in front of the airfoil as it moves through the air. This shape is in contrast to subsonic airfoils, which often have rounded leading edges to reduce flow separation over a wide range of angle of attack. A rounded edge would behave as a blunt body in supersonic flight and thus would form a bow shock, which greatly increases wave drag. The airfoils' thickness, camber, and angle of attack are varied to achieve a design that will cause a slight deviation in the direction of the surrounding airflow.

== Drag ==
At supersonic conditions, aircraft drag is originated due to:

- Skin-friction drag due to shearing.
- The wave drag due to the thickness (or volume) or zero-lift wave drag
- Drag due to lift

Therefore, the Drag coefficient on a supersonic airfoil is described by the following expression:

C_{D}= C_{D,friction}+ C_{D,thickness}+ C_{D,lift}

Experimental data allow us to reduce this expression to:

C_{D}= C_{D,O} + KC_{L^{2}} Where C_{DO} is the sum of C_{(D,friction}) and C_{D,thickness}, and k for supersonic flow is a function of the Mach number. The skin-friction component is derived from the presence of a viscous boundary layer which is infinitely close to the surface of the aircraft body. At the boundary wall, the normal component of velocity is zero; therefore an infinitesimal area exists where there is no slip. The zero-lift wave drag component can be obtained based on the supersonic area rule which tells us that the wave-drag of an aircraft in a steady supersonic flow is identical to the average of a series of equivalent bodies of revolution. The bodies of revolution are defined by the cuts through the aircraft made by the tangent to the fore Mach cone from a distant point of the aircraft at an azimuthal angle. This average is over all azimuthal angles. The drag due-to lift component is calculated using lift-analysis programs. The wing design and the lift-analysis programs are separate lifting-surfaces methods that solve the direct or inverse problem of design and lift analysis.

== Supersonic wing design ==
Years of research and experience with the unusual conditions of supersonic flow have led to some interesting conclusions about airfoil design. Considering a rectangular wing, the pressure at a point P with coordinates (x,y) on the wing is defined only by the pressure disturbances originated at points within the upstream Mach cone emanating from point P. As result, the wing tips modify the flow within their own rearward Mach cones. The remaining area of the wing does not suffer any modification by the tips and can be analyzed with two-dimensional theory. For an arbitrary planform the supersonic leading and trailing are those portions of the wing edge where the components of the freestream velocity normal to the edge are supersonic. Similarly the subsonic leading and trailing are those portions of the wing edge where the components of the free stream velocity normal to the edge are subsonic.

Delta wings have supersonic leading and trailing edges; in contrast arrow wings have a subsonic leading edge and a supersonic trailing edge.

When designing a supersonic airfoil two factors that must be considered are shock and expansion waves. Whether a shock or expansion wave is generated at different locations along an airfoil depends on the local flow speed and direction along with the geometry of the airfoil.

== Summary ==
Aerodynamic efficiency for supersonic aircraft increases with thin section airfoils with sharp leading and trailing edges. Swept wings where the leading edge is subsonic have the advantage of reducing the wave drag component at supersonic speeds; however experiments show that the theoretical benefits are not always attained due to separation of the flow over the surface of the wing; however this can be corrected with design factors. Double-Wedge and Bi-convex airfoils are the most common airfoils used for supersonic aircraft.

== See also ==
- Area rule
- Mach number
- Sonic boom
- Sound barrier
- Stall (fluid mechanics)
- Supersonic aerodynamics
- Supersonic speed
