= Paper Aircraft Released Into Space =

The Paper Aircraft Released Into Space (PARIS) project was a privately organized endeavour undertaken by various staff members of the British information technology website The Register to design, build, test, and launch a lightweight aerospace vehicle, constructed mostly of paper and similar structural materials, into the mid-stratosphere and recover it intact.

On 28 October 2010, an aircraft was successfully launched at 90,000 ft (27,000 m)—17 miles up—setting a then world record for "highest altitude paper plane launch" recognised by Guinness World Records at a location about 120 miles (190 km) west of Madrid, Spain.

== Project ==
Staffers at The Register, inspired by the CU Spaceflight Nova 1 project, formally announced their intention to initiate a project of their own on 30 July 2009. The aircraft's name was selected by a poll of the readers of The Register. was subsequently named Vulture 1 (a reference to The Register's own nickname "Vulture Central").

The use of the word "space" in the project's name refers to "near space", not "outer space", since it was not planned for the vehicle to ascend to an altitude above the Kármán line (the boundary of outer space, defined by the Fédération Aéronautique Internationale as 100 km (62 mi) above the earth's surface); it is nevertheless a project that is closely related to the concept of private spaceflight.

Lester Haines, special projects editor ("Iberian Bureau") at The Register, as part of his reporting on CU Spaceflight's Nova 1 mission in 2006, and at the behest of Nova team member Carl Morland, mused that "El Reg might like to contribute something" as a payload to a future high-altitude balloon project, and invited the online magazine's readership to make suggestions as to what kind of payload package should be designed and built. After languishing for a few years in limbo, the balloon payload project was resurrected in July 2009 and called PARIS, as a backronym from Paper Aircraft Released Into Space after Paris Hilton, the payload type having been suggested by readers in 2006.

The paper plane was successfully launched on 28 October 2010.

== LOHAN ==
As of 2011, The Register was working on PARIS' successor, named LOHAN (short for "Low Orbit Helium Assisted Navigator"), a balloon-launched rocket-powered aircraft. However, Lester Haines died in 2016 of a heart attack while LOHAN was still awaiting FAA approval, and as of 2023 The Register has yet to publish anything more about it.

== See also ==
- Paper planes launched from space
