= Characteristic energy length scale =

The characteristic energy length scale $\chi$ in fracture mechanics describes the size of the region from which energy flows to a rapidly moving crack.

The length scale size decreases proportionally to the square of applied stress. If size decreases to the order of magnitude of a hyperelastic zone at the crack tip, local wave speeds can dominate crack dynamics. This can lead to supersonic fracture or to a reduction in fracture propagation speed, depending on whether the material undergoes hyperelastic stiffening or softening, respectively.
