= International Union of Theoretical and Applied Mechanics =

Scientific organization

- Abbreviation: IUTAM
- Formation: 1924; 102 years ago
- Type: INGO
- Region served: Worldwide
- Official language: English
- President: Jacques Magnaudet (France)
- Parent organization: International Science Council (ISC)
- Website: www.iutam.org

The International Union of Theoretical and Applied Mechanics (IUTAM) is an international non-governmental scientific organization whose primary mission is to promote theoretical and applied mechanics as a scientific discipline, especially by organizing international congresses, symposia and summer schools. A deed of incorporation was executed on November 4th 2022 to register IUTAM as an incorporated Association with full legal capacity, with a KVK registration number 88085457. IUTAM was established in 1946 in Paris but actually originates from the series of International Applied Mechanics Conferences (ICAM), the first of which was held in Delft in 1924. In 2022, IUTAM was registered as a Dutch association, domiciled in Amsterdam. IUTAM is a member of the International Science Council and thereby contributes to a global voice on science.

== History ==
IUTAM was organized in 1946 at the sixth International Congress of Applied Mechanics (ICAM) in Paris. The first ICAM was held in 1924 in Delft, Netherlands, under the guidance of Jan Burgers, with 214 participants from 21 countries.

The Delft congress was the first in a series of International Congresses of Applied Mechanics. The second was held in 1926 in Zurich. Afterwards these congresses were convened in four-year intervals: 1930 in Stockholm, 1934 in Cambridge, England, 1938 in Cambridge, USA. After the Second World War the tradition of these conferences was resumed under the umbrella of an official organization, the International Union for Theoretical and Applied Mechanics (IUTAM).

However, the spirit of international cooperation in mechanics was initiated two years before by Theodore and Josephine de Karman, natives of Hungary that worked in Germany before going to Caltech. The "zeroth" ICAM was organized for 1922 to discuss hydrodynamics and aerodynamics:

I managed to get together with Dr. Tullio Levi-Civita, a distinguished mathematician from the University of Rome, and we decided to call the first international conference on mechanics. We issued invitations to the French, British and Americans to meet with their former enemies, the Germans, Austrians and Hungarians, in Innsbruck, Austria. My sister and I paid the secretarial expenses out of our own pocket.

Von Kármán describes the revival of internationalism after World War II: [In 1946] we revived the International Congress of Applied Mechanics, which I had helped to create after World War I and which served as a forum for my scientific contest with Prandtl. In 1938, when the members voted to suspend further meetings, we also voted that if world conditions ever changed for the better, we would hold the next meeting in Paris. So eight years and a world war later we kept our word. The meeting was a great success in bringing together representatives of all nations. It was here that we formalized the congress into the International Union for Theoretical and Applied Mechanics (IUTAM).

=== List of ICAM and ICTAM meetings ===
ICAM: 1924 Delft (The Netherlands), 1926 Zurich (Switzerland), 1930 Stockholm (Sweden), 1934 Cambridge (UK), 1938 Cambridge (USA), 1946 Paris (France)

ICTAM: 1948 London (UK), 1952 Istanbul (Turkey), 1956 Brussels (Belgium), 1960 Stresa (Italy), 1964 Munich (Germany), 1968 Stanford (USA), 1972 Moscow (USSR, now Russia), 1976 Delft (The Netherlands), 1980 Toronto (Canada), 1984 Lyngby (Denmark), 1988 Grenoble (France), 1992 Haifa (Israel), 1996 Kyoto (Japan), 2000 Chicago (USA), 2004 Warsaw (Poland), 2008 Adelaide (Australia), 2012 Beijing (China), 2016 Montreal (Canada), 2020+1 Milan (Italy). Held virtually due to the Covid 19 pandemic, 2024 Daegu (Republic of Korea) 2028 Vienna (Austria)

== Committees and governance ==
The core members of IUTAM are Adhering Organisations (AO) that pay an annual fee, and nominate representatives with righting votes at the General Meeting of Members (GMM) which is the governing body of IUTAM. Forty-four AO, each of which represents a country, are currently affiliated to IUTAM. Twenty-one international organisations active in scientific fields closely related to that of IUTAM also have the statute of Affiliated Organisation and send observers to the GMM. The GMM meets virtually every odd year and physically every even year. An eight-person Board of Directors (BoD) is the top executive body of IUTAM. The BoD operates on a day-to-day basis. It meets physically once a year and holds frequent virtual meetings. IUTAM organizes every four years the International Congress of Theoretical and Applied Mechanics (ICTAM), informally known as the `Olympics’ of mechanics. A dedicated body with 33 members, the Congress Committee (CC), is in charge of the scientific programme, especially the selection of the plenary and semi-plenary lecturers, and of the selection of the venue for the next congress. An executive committee appointed from within its ranks is in charge of organizational aspects and meets physically once a year. IUTAM also endorses scientifically and sponsors financially Symposia and Summer Schools in both fluid and solid mechanics. The aim of these events, of which a dozen are organized every year, is to bring together a select group of active scientists within a well-defined field of mechanics to foster the development of that field. Two panels of five people each are in charge of evaluating proposals submitted for IUTAM Symposia and Summer Schools in fluid and solid mechanics, respectively. The final decision is taken by the GMM. Specific grants may be attributed to symposia and summer schools promoting or advancing Diversity, understood as the range of human differences, including but not limited to race, gender, age, subject of expertise and geographic representation.

== Awards ==
Since 2008 IUTAM awards the Batchelor Prize and the Rodney Hill Prize for outstanding research in fluid and solid mechanics, respectively. These two prizes are named after leading figures over the second half of the 20th century in their respective field. Each prize has a value of $25,000 and is awarded every four years at the ICTAM conference. Since 1988, an IUTAM Bureau Prize, renamed the IUTAM Directors Prize in 2024, is awarded to two or three outstanding young scientists for their papers and presentations at the ICTAM conference.

== Other sources ==
- Fons Alkemade (2010) Some of IUTAM's History from IUTAM.
