= National Paper Airplane Day =

Unofficial day of celebration

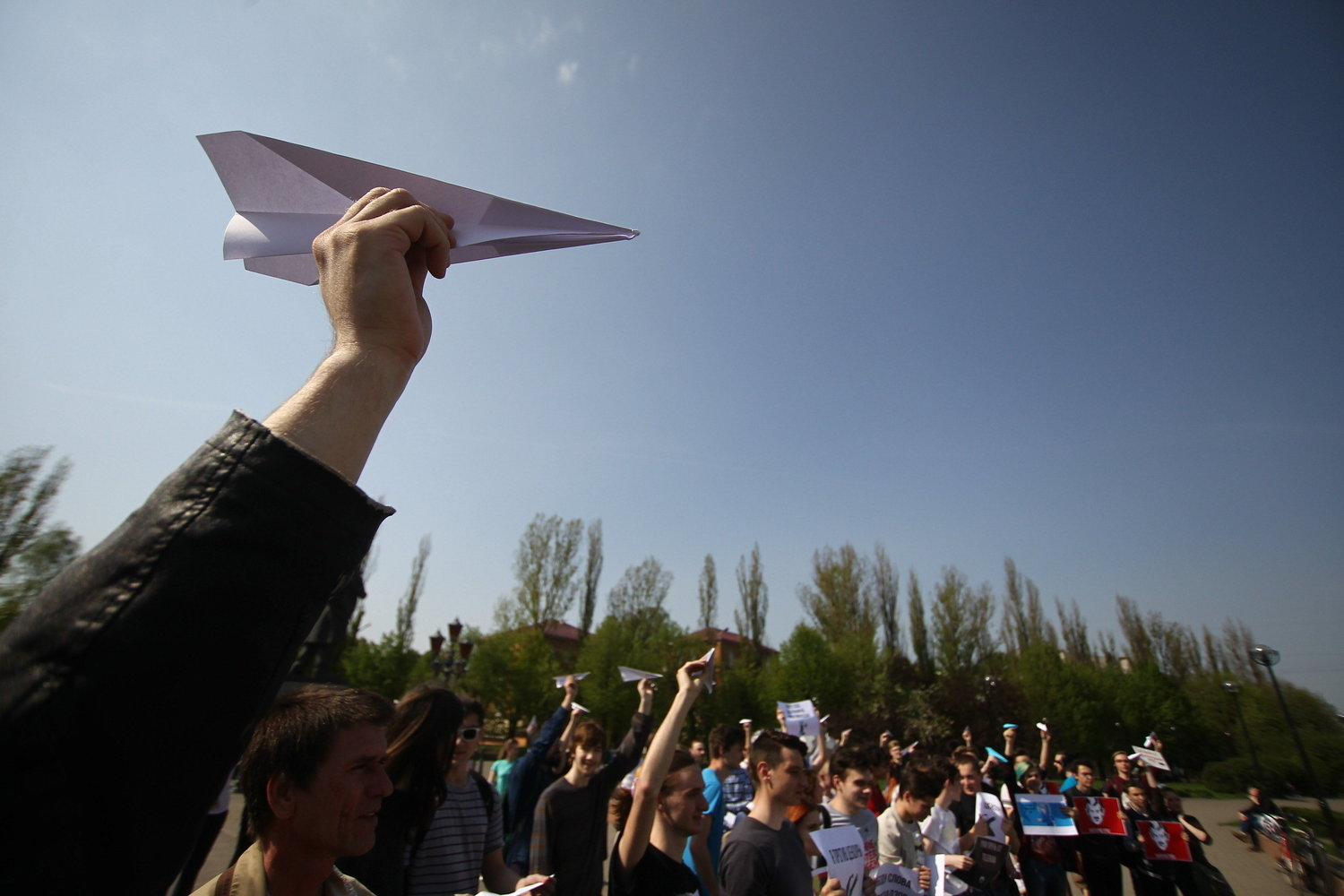
- A paper airplane held up at a rally in Kaliningrad
- Observances: Creating and flying paper airplanes; flight time and distance contests
- Date: May 26
- Next time: 26 May 2027
- Frequency: Annual

National Paper Airplane Day is an unofficial observance, celebrated on May 26 each year in the United States to commemorate the simple aeronautical toy. It has been celebrated annual since at least 2012 with the date chosen to roughly align with the end of the school year and start of summer for many children.

Paper airplane day celebrations typically include social gatherings at which participants create and fly paper airplanes. These events often feature contests in two basic flight categories: "distance" and "time in air". As of 2026, a team of students from China hold the world record for the longest time in air (31.2 seconds). The distance record (98.43 meters) was set by the same team in December 2025.
