= The Register =

British technology news and opinion website

- Screenshot of the website in December 2024
- Website type: Technology news
- Available in: English
- Headquarters: London, England
- Owner: Situation Publishing
- Creators: Mike Magee; John Lettice
- Website: www.theregister.com
- IPv6 support: No
- Commercial: Yes
- Registration: Optional
- Launched: 1994; 32 years ago
- Current status: Active

The Register (often also called El Reg) is a British technology news website co-founded in 1994 by Mike Magee and John Lettice. The masthead sublogo is a vulture "Biting the hand that feeds IT." The publication's primary focus is information technology news and opinions. In 2025, The Register was named the "BBC of cloud computing news" by the premiere cloud computing industry conference, CloudFest.

Situation Publishing Ltd is the site's publisher. Drew Cullen is an owner, and Linus Birtles is the managing director. Andrew Orlowski was the executive editor before leaving the website in May 2019.

== History ==
The Register was founded in London as an email newsletter called Chip Connection. In 1998, The Register became a daily online news source. Magee left in 2001 to start competing publications The Inquirer and later the IT Examiner and TechEye.

In 2002, The Register expanded to have a presence in London and San Francisco, creating The Register USA at theregus.com through a joint venture with Tom's Hardware. In 2003, that site moved to theregister.com. That content was later merged onto theregister.co.uk, but the entire site moved to theregister.com in 2023. The Register carries news and columns including Simon Travaglia's BOFH stories.

In 2010, The Register supported the successful launch of the Paper Aircraft Released into Space, a project they announced in 2009 that released a paper plane in the extreme upper atmosphere.

== Readership and content ==
In 2011, it was read daily by over 350,000 users according to the Audit Bureau of Circulations, rising to 468,000 daily and nearly 9.5 million monthly in 2013. In November 2011, the UK and US each accounted for approximately 42% and 34% of page impressions respectively, with Canada being the next most significant origin of page hits at 3%. In 2012, the UK and US accounted for approximately 41% and 28% of page impressions respectively, with Canada at 3.61%.

Channel Register covers computer business and trade news, which includes business press releases. News and articles for computer hardware and consumer electronics are covered by Reg Hardware. Reg Research is an in-depth resource on technologies and how they relate to business.

Their stories are cited by major news sources and also used for backup information. Stories in other periodicals were based on their exposés. For instance, InformationWeek ran a story about The Register's story, as used as the source for a New York Times article.

In September 2018, its Alexa ranking was #7,194.

The National Archives and Records Administration has archived part of the Web site.

== Writers ==
The Register has an editorial staff of about 20 writers and production experts around the world. Matt Rosoff is editor-in-chief. Paul Kunert is EMEA editor, Jude Karabus is EMEA deputy editor, Avram Piltch is US editor, and Simon Sharwood is Asia-Pacific editor. Columnists include Mark Pesce and Rupert Goodwins.

== Intel chips flaw investigation ==
On 6 February 2017, The Register linked a clock signal issue in Cisco hardware to a serious defect on Intel's Atom C2000 series processors.

Around 3 January 2018, The Register broke news about Google's long-ongoing investigation into Intel's processor design, which revealed that a serious flaw in the design of its chips would require Microsoft, Apple, and Linux developers to release patches for their operating systems.

== Criticism ==
On 12 October 2010, Martin Robbins of The Guardian accused The Register of misunderstanding climate science and misrepresenting a paper from the journal Nature in a manner that deliberately minimized the climate impact of human emissions. The Register published its "amusingly put-out 'response'" the same day.

== See also ==
- ZDNET
