= The Inquirer =

British technology tabloid website

- News, reviews, facts and friction
- Website type: Tech tabloid
- Available in: English
- Dissolved: 19 December 2019; 6 years ago
- Owner: Incisive Media Ltd.
- Creator: Mike Magee
- Editor: Carly Page
- Key people: Lee Bell; Roland Moore-Colyer; Dave Neal; Chris Merriman; Alan Martin
- Commercial: Yes
- Registration: No
- Launched: 2001; 25 years ago
- Current status: Ceased publishing

The Inquirer (stylized as TheINQUIRER) was a British technology tabloid website founded by Mike Magee after his departure from The Register (of which he was one of the founding members) in 2001. In 2006 the site was acquired by Dutch publisher Verenigde Nederlandse Uitgeverijen (VNU). Mike Magee later left The Inquirer in February 2008 to work on the IT Examiner.

Historically, the magazine was entirely Internet-based with its journalists living all over the world and filing copy online, though in recent years it has been edited from Incisive Media's offices in London.

Although traditionally a 'red top', under Incisive Media it has put more weight behind its journalism, reducing the number of jibes at companies, and moved instead towards sponsored online debates in association with high-profile organisations, most recently, Intel.

The Inquirer ceased publishing on 19 December 2019, partly due to declining digital advertising revenues.

== Scoops ==
=== Sony laptop battery scandal ===
In 2006 The Inquirer reported laptop battery problems that affected Dell, Sony and Apple as of September 2006, with rumours of problems at Toshiba and Lenovo. In June 2006, The Inquirer published photographs of a Dell notebook PC bursting into flames at a conference in Japan; The New York Times reprinted The Inquirer's photographs. The Inquirer was also the first publication to report Dell's subsequent decision to recall faulty batteries, according to BusinessWeek.

The Inquirer's successful reporting of the story relied on information supplied by readers and later by a confidential source at Dell. "I attribute being on top of the story to old-fashioned print journalism standards – cultivating, and, if you'll excuse the pun, not burning such contacts," The Inquirer's founder, Mike Magee, told BusinessWeek.

=== Rydermark ===
In July 2006, The Inquirer posted images to show cheating by Nvidia Windows device drivers in Rydermark 2006. The images were alleged to be fake by a number of sources. The Inquirer denied any wrongdoing and quoted the maker of Rydermark calling the allegations against them "irresponsible". About 8 months after the original Rydermark article, The Inquirer ran another article claiming that Rydermark was still being developed, but was near release. In response, one of its critics offered $1,000 to a charity of the Rydermark articles author's choosing if he could produce (breaching his NDA) a version of Rydermark that showed the alleged screenshots in full-motion video before a set deadline (which gave the author 10 and a half hours, beginning at 6:30PM UK time). No one produced the program before the deadline passed.

Independent verification that RyderMark was genuine, first appeared in TweakTown in May 2007. RyderMark developer Ajith Ram denied ever sending the Inquirer Nvidia cheating allegations.

=== ATI Intel front side bus license revocation ===
On 24 July 2006, The Inquirer wrote that, in response to AMD's announced intent to purchase ATI, "ATI had its chipset license pulled, or at least not renewed by Intel." ATI responded by stating that its license had not been revoked and that they continue to ship Intel chipsets under license. On 23 August 2006, ATI showed its chipset roadmap to motherboard vendors which showed that next-generation chipsets for the Intel platform are cancelled. On 1 March 2007, AMD said that they would continue developing chipsets for Intel platforms.

=== Windows 10 Technical Preview eavesdropping ===
On 3 October 2014, The Inquirer reported on the privacy policy for the Technical Preview the upcoming Microsoft Windows 10 operating system. In the report, it pointed out that the permissions included the ability for Microsoft to monitor individual keystrokes as well as file content from users. The story was picked up by news media around the world causing Microsoft to admit that monitoring was a necessary part of the process, but denying use of a keylogger.

Ed Bott, writing for ZDNet, accused the site of being "a tech tabloid known for its breathless headlines and factually challenged prose" and said of writer Chris Merriman, "there's little evidence that the author has enough background in computer science or security to tell a keylogger from a key lime pie."
