= Mike Magee (journalist) =

British journalist (1949–2024)

Michael Magee
- Born: 7 December 1949
- Died: 11 August 2024 (aged 74); Oxford, Oxfordshire, England, UK
- Occupations: Journalist and writer
- Known for: Technology journalism, occultism, and tantra
- Spouse: Jan Bailey (m. 1978, divorced)
- Children: Tamlin Magee
- Writing career
- Period: 1960s to 2024
- Subjects: Tantra and occultism
- Website: www.shivashakti.com

Michael Magee (7 December 1949 – 11 August 2024) was a British journalist. He is credited with introducing a tabloid-style approach to the coverage of technology news, as a founder of The Register and later The Inquirer. In 2009 the Daily Telegraph placed Magee 35 in its list of Top 50 most influential Britons in technology. Magee was also a prominent proponent of occultism and tantra.

== Technology journalism career ==
Magee worked for VNU Business Publications on PC Dealer before working at their IT news venture VNU Newswire. He left the Newswire and co-founded The Register, the UK's first Internet-based IT tabloid, with John Lettice in 1994. In the newsletter, Magee focused on computer chip reporting, and Lettice covered software.

The Register used the slogan "Biting the Hand That Feeds IT" to reflect its iconoclastic attitude, attracting a following among IT professionals and investors.

In December 2000, Magee suffered a heart attack. When he returned to work, he stated publicly that he disagreed with the editorial direction of The Register. He left to found The Inquirer to reflect the original editorial philosophy. Unlike The Register, which had substantial capital investment, The Inquirer received little financing, but still managed to make a profit. Magee was the only full-time employee. The entire magazine was based on freelance submissions, and staff and its advertising were outsourced.

In 2006 Magee met with VNU leaders over their alleged use of a web layout similar to that of The Inquirer. Magee sold The Inquirer to VNU later that year. Magee remained as editor of The Inquirer until February 2008, when he left to pursue other publishing ventures including TechEye.

In 2008, Magee, established the IT Examiner, an information technology news website based in Bangalore, India. It was financially backed by Chinese company Metaplume, with the aim of capitalising on the growth of India's burgeoning IT industry. In 2009, Metaplume terminated all the staff and the site was shut down.

He joined Fudzilla as Editor-at-Large in July 2016.

== Occultism and tantra ==
During the 1960s Magee experimented with the occult teachings of the Hermetic Order of the Golden Dawn and Kenneth Grant's "Typhonian" branch of the Ordo Templi Orientis. In 1971 he started a small occult magazine called Azoth, and in 1973 in conjunction with David Hall, and his girlfriend Janet Bailey, started a more ambitious six monthly magazine called SOTHiS. Around this time, he had a lucid dream involving the Indian goddess Kali while on holiday, which left him with a keen wish to learn more about the Indian traditions.

In 1978, he went to India and met with an English tantrik guru (and former student of Aleister Crowley) called HH Shri Gurudev Mahendranath (1911–1992) who was a guru of the Uttarakaula Tantric Order of northern India. Mahendranath gave Magee the title of a guru and a charter to form a group of students. Magee took the tantrik name of Lokanath. Later this was to become a nucleus for the "Arcane Magical Order of the Knights of Shambhala" (AMOOKOS). This group was highly influential, particularly in the way it brought Tantrik teachings to the West. In the UK it had about 500 members.

In 1990, Mahendranath claimed, despite some evidence to the contrary, that he had not ever given Magee the right to form AMOOKOS, and the group fragmented. From that point onwards, Magee concentrated on providing translations for Tantra website Shiva Shakti Mandalam.

== Personal life and death ==
Magee married Jan Bailey in a civil ceremony in 1978. They later separated, and he lived in Oxford until his death. His son, Tamlin Magee, has written for The Inquirer and as news editor on TechEye.

Magee died on 11 August 2024, at the age of 74.

== Published works ==
- Editor: The Cipher MSS of the Golden Dawn, Azoth Publishing 1973
- Tantrik Astrology, Mandrake Press, Oxford 1989 ISBN 1-869928-06-7
- Tantra Magick, Mandrake Press, Oxford 1990 ISBN 1-869928-11-3
- Yakṣiṇī Magic, Twisted Trunk Press, London 2020 ISBN 1-916236-6-18
- Kali Magic, Twisted Trunk Books, London 2022 ISBN 1-916236-6-26

Translations

- Kaulajnananirnya of the School of Matsyendranath, Prachya Prakashan, Varanasi 1986
- Vamakeshvarimatam, Prachya Prakashan, Varanasi 1986
- Matrikabhedatantram, Indological Book House, Delhi, 1986
- Kaulopanishad, Worldwide Tantra Series 1995
- Ganapati Upanishad, Worldwide Tantra Series 1995
- Dhvajadi Prasna, Worldwide Tantra Series 1995
- Magic of Kali, Worldwide Tantra Series 1995
