= Datamation =

American computer magazine

- February 1998, the final print edition of Datamation magazine
- Categories: Computer magazine
- Format: Online magazine
- Founded: 1957
- Final issue: February 1998; 28 years ago (print)
- Company: TechnologyAdvice
- Country: United States
- Language: English
- Website: datamation.com
- ISSN: 0011-6963

Datamation is a computer magazine that was published in print form in the United States between 1957 and 1998, and has since continued publication on the web. Datamation was previously owned by QuinStreet and acquired by TechnologyAdvice in 2020. Datamation is published as an online magazine at Datamation.com.

== History and profile ==
Its predecessor started as a trade/engineering magazine called Research & Engineering (1955–1957). In 1957 it was rebranded to The Magazine of Datamation (from the issue no. 7), and in 1959 the name was finally changed to Datamation (from the issue no. 3). (Note: The Datamation on the cover was exposed starting from 1957; Until the 1959 there were two names inside the magazine (The Magazine … and Research … on bottom of the pages).)

When Datamation as such was first launched in 1957, it was not clear there would be a significant market for a computer magazine given how few computers there were. The idea for the magazine came from Donald Prell who was Vice President of Application Engineering at Benson-Lehner Corporation, a Los Angeles computer input-output company. In 1957, the only place his company could advertise their products was in either Scientific American or Business Week. Prell had discussed the idea with John Diebold who started "Automation Data Processing Newsletter", and that was the inspiration for the name DATAMATION. F.D. Thompson Publishing, Inc., agreed to publish the magazine with its owner, Frank D. Thompson, as the New York City-based publisher, but with its editorial operations in Los Angeles.

After leaving Benson-Lehner, Prell served as the magazine's technical consultant and later, while based in London, its European editor. Sandy Lanzarotta served as the magazine's first editor, then Harold Bergstein moved from managing editor to editor when Lanzarotta joined IBM's marketing department. Robert B. Forest succeeded Bergstein as editor in 1963 and remained in that role for over a decade. The magazine was later acquired by Technical Publications, and subsequently that entity was acquired by Dun and Bradstreet.

In 1970, The New York Times referred to "12-year-old Datamation, the acknowledged leader in the field."

In 1995, after rival CMP Media Inc.'s 1994 launch of its TechWeb network of publications, Datamation worked in partnership with Bolt Beranek and Newman (BBN) and launched one of the first online publications, Datamation.com. In 1996, Datamation editors Bill Semich, Michael Lasell and April Blumenstiel, received the first-ever Jesse H. Neal Editorial Achievement Award for an online publication. The Neal Award is the highest award for business journalism in the U.S.

In 1998, when its publisher, Reed Business Information (who had earlier acquired Technical Publications in 1986), terminated print publication of Datamation 41 years after its first issue went to press, the online version, Datamation.com, became one of the first online-only magazines. In 2001, Internet.com (WebMediaBrands) acquired the still-profitable Datamation.com online publication. In 2009, Internet.com (and Datamation.com) were acquired by Quinstreet, Inc.

== Computer humor ==
Traditionally, an April issue of Datamation contained a number of spoof articles and humorous stories related to computers.

However, humor was not limited to April. For example, in a spoof Datamation article (December 1973), R. Lawrence Clark suggested that the GOTO statement could be replaced by the COMEFROM statement and provided some entertaining examples. This was actually implemented in the INTERCAL programming language, a language designed to make programs as obscure as possible.

Real Programmers Don't Use Pascal was a letter to the editor of Datamation, volume 29 number 7, July 1983, written by Ed Post, Tektronix, Wilsonville, Oregon, USA.

Much of the early humor was collected in 1966 in "Faith, Hope, and Parity".

Some of the BOFH stories were reprinted in Datamation.

The humor section was resurrected in 1996 by editor in chief Bill Semich with a two-page spread titled "Over the Edge" with material contributed by Annals of Improbable Research editor Marc Abrahams and MISinformation editor Chris Miksanek. Semich also commissioned BOFH author Simon Travaglia to write humor columns for the magazine. Later that year, Miksanek became the sole humor contributor (though in 1998 "Over the Edge" was augmented with an online weblinks companion by Miksanek's alter-ego "The Duke of URL"). The column was dropped from the magazine in 2001 when it was acquired by Internet.com.

A collection of "Over the Edge" columns was published in 2008 under the title "Esc: 400 Years of Computer Humor" (ISBN 1434892484).
