= Kline–Fogleman airfoil =

Airfoil design

Aircraft wing showing the KFm2 Step

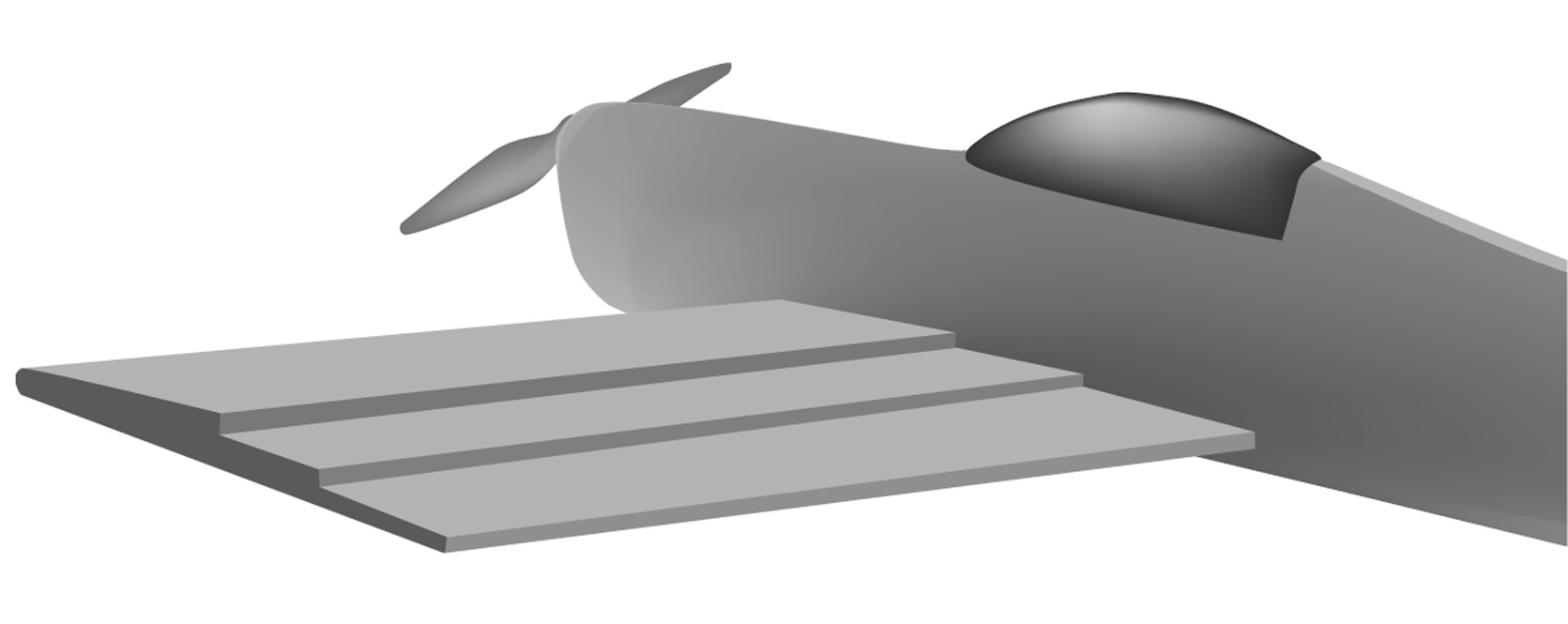
Aircraft wing showing the KFm3 Step

The Kline–Fogleman airfoil or KF airfoil is a simple airfoil design with single or multiple steps along the length of the wing. The purpose of the step, it is claimed, is to allow some of the displaced air to fall into a pocket behind the step and become part of the airfoil shape as a trapped vortex or vortex attachment. This purportedly prevents separation and maintains airflow over the surface of the airfoil.

The KF airfoil was originally devised in the 1960s for paper airplanes. In the 21st century it has found renewed interest among hobbyist builders of radio-controlled aircraft, due to its simplicity of construction. It has not been adopted for full-size aircraft capable of carrying a pilot, passengers, or other substantial payloads.

== History ==
The KF airfoil was designed by Richard Kline and Floyd Fogleman.

Aircraft wing showing the KFm4 Step

In the early 1960s, Richard Kline wanted to make a paper airplane that could handle strong winds, climb high, level off by itself, and then enter a long, downwards glide. After many experiments he was able to achieve this goal. He presented the paper airplane to Floyd Fogleman who saw it fly and resist stalling. The two men then filed for a patent on the stepped airfoil.

Further development resulted in two patents and a family of airfoils known as the KF airfoil and KFm airfoils (for Kline–Fogleman modified). The two patents, US Patents #3,706,430 and #4,046,338, refer to the introduction of a step on either the bottom (KFm1) or the top (KFm2) of an airfoil, or on both the top and bottom (KFm4). Variations include airfoils with two steps on the top (KFm3), or two steps on the top and one on the bottom (KFm7).

The purpose of the step, it is claimed, is to allow some of the displaced air to fall into a pocket behind the step and become part of the airfoil shape as a trapped vortex or vortex attachment. This purportedly prevents separation and maintains airflow over the surface of the airfoil.

== Reception ==
Time published an April 2, 1973 article, The Paper-Plane Caper, about the paper airplane and its Kline–Fogleman airfoil.

Also in 1973, CBS 60 Minutes did a 15-minute segment on the KF airfoil. CBS reran the show in 1976.

In 1985, Kline wrote a book entitled The Ultimate Paper Airplane. To publicize the book, Kline traveled to Kill Devil Hills, NC, the site where the Wright Brothers first had flown where their first manned powered flight, of 122 feet (37 m). A crew from Good Morning America filmed the event. The longest flight by Kline with his paper airplane traveled 401 feet 4 inches (122.33 m).

== Independent scientific testing ==
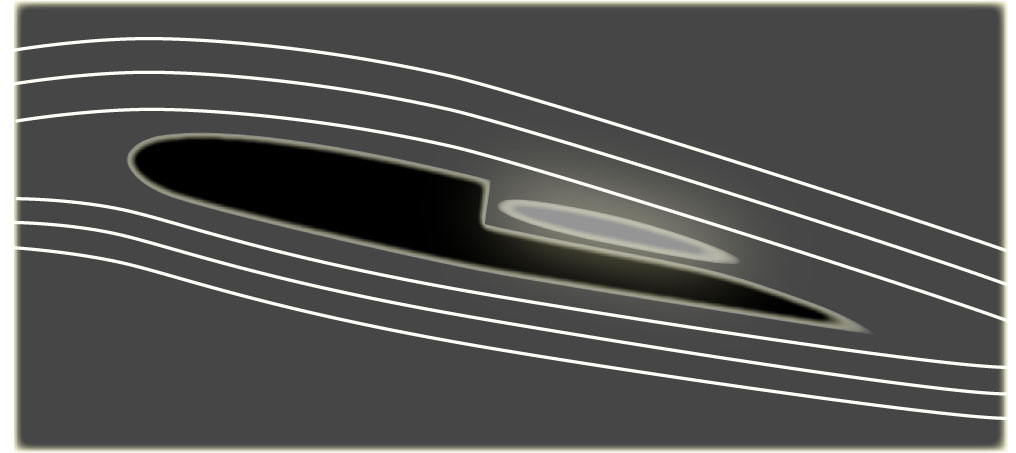
KFm2 airfoil showing purported laminar flow vortex

In 1974, a NASA-funded study prompted by Kline and Fogelman's claims and the resulting national coverage found the airfoil to have worse lift-to-drag ratio than a flat plate airfoil in wind tunnel tests.

In the 1990s, after the original patents expired, researchers returned to the topic of stepped wings. A 1998 study by Fathi Finaish and Stephen Witherspoon at the University of Missouri tested numerous step configurations in a wind tunnel. While many step configurations made wing performance worse, promising results were achieved with backward-facing steps on the lower surface of the wing, in some cases showing considerable enhancement in lift without a significant drag penalty. However, the researchers found that a single configuration could not be the best solution at every angle of attack and flight speed; instead, they concluded that "vastly different configurations may be needed during a single maneuver." The idea works, Finaish and Witherspoon concluded, but only with active automated reconfiguration of the shape of the steps during flight. A 2008 study by Fabrizio De Gregorio and Giuseppe Fraioli at CIRA and the University of Rome in Italy pursued this idea further. The model airfoils used in their wind tunnel tests were equipped with numerous small holes through which air could be blown or sucked in an active way. They concluded that the trapped vortex formed by a cavity or step could not be held in place without such active control. Merely relying passively on wing shape was not enough – the vortex would detach, possibly yielding worse characteristics than the original unstepped airfoil. But when active controls were used to keep the vortex stably in place, they found the results "really encouraging".

The case study conducted as a part of this research focused on the UAV RQ-2 Pioneer employed in a stepped-airfoil configuration by comparing its aerodynamic characteristics with the conventional NACA 4415 airfoil originally used on this aircraft. The main objective of the case study was to identify and outline a step schedule for the flight envelope of the UAV Pioneer using a stepped-airfoil configuration at the same time applying active flow control to obtain enhanced aerodynamic performance over conventional NACA 4415 airfoil originally used and hence improve the flight performance characteristics like range and endurance of the aircraft.

== Applications of the KF airfoil today ==
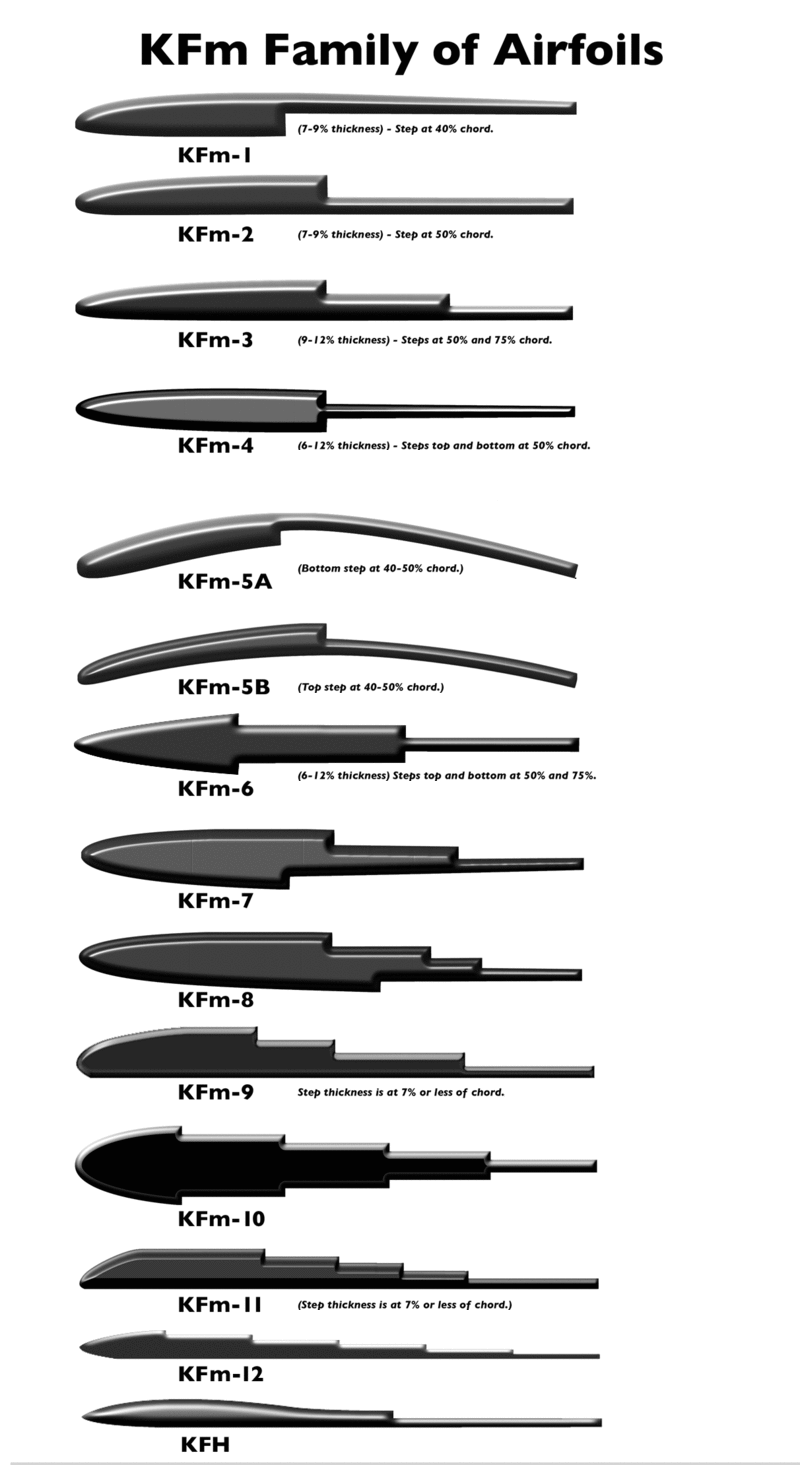
KFm Family of airfoils

Poor lift-to-drag ratio performance in wind tunnel testing has meant that, to date, the KF airfoil has not been used on any full-size aircraft. But the KF airfoil and derivative "stepped" airfoils have in recent years gained a following in the world of foam-constructed radio-controlled model aircraft. The low Reynolds numbers allow for the stepped airfoils to produce a significant amount of lift for the drag incurred, making them increasingly popular among RC hobbyists.

The simple KF airfoil shape lends itself well to construction in sheets of various plastic foams, typically expanded polystyrene (EPS) or expanded polypropylene (EPP). The resulting stepped wing can have improved performance and flying characteristics compared to the simpler "flat-plate" wing used in some radio-controlled models. The airfoils illustrated in this article are examples of those used in radio-control foam models.

The KF airfoil has been applied to the Darrieus wind turbine using a trapped vortex. Experiments have found the KF rotor demonstrates a higher static and dynamic torque with low-Reynolds applications and better performance for wind conditions lower than 0.8 m/s. It is seen a potential solution for self-starting in the Darrieus wind turbine.

The first man-carrying KF airfoil-based aircraft was successfully flown in 1987 by Richard Wood in Canada. (The Recreational Flyer Magazine November December 1991) Top speed was higher and stall was slower (The Recreational Flyer Magazine. November / December 1991). The airfoil was tested on a Vector 600 ultralight. This is the first and only known attempt of putting this airfoil on a full-sized aircraft. After discussion with the inventor Dick Kline, it was decided to have 2 notches per wing. This led to a beneficial side effect for the wing of keeping the airflow attached to the wing at high angles of attack. The Vector 600 Ultralight was covered in aircraft fabric and had the notches built in but covered over. First flights were conducted with the notches covered over to produce a regular air foil. Subsequent flights had the notches cut open and exposed. An increase in top speed and a lower stall speed were noted. Regular flight did not seem affected. https://www.youtube.com/watch?v=A1zy57S5DUQ

== Patents ==
- U.S. patent 3,706,430 AIRFOIL FOR AIRCRAFT, filed March 17, 1970, issued December 1972
- U.S. patent 4,046,338 Airfoil for aircraft having improved lift generating device, filed October 14, 1975, issued September 6, 1977

== See also ==
- Lift (force)
- Plasma actuator
- Radio-controlled glider
- Simple Plastic Airplane Design
- Wing
