= Supersonic fracture =

Supersonic fractures are fractures where the fracture propagation velocity is higher than the speed of sound in the material. This phenomenon was first discovered by scientists from the Max Planck Institute for Metals Research in Stuttgart (Markus J. Buehler and Huajian Gao) and IBM Almaden Research Center in San Jose, California (Farid F. Abraham).

The issues of intersonic and supersonic fracture become the frontier of dynamic fracture mechanics. The work of Burridge initiated the exploration for intersonic crack growth (when the crack tip velocity V is between the shear in wave speed C^8 and the longitudinal wave speed C^1.

Supersonic fracture was a phenomenon totally unexplained by the classical theories of fracture. Molecular dynamics simulations by the group around Abraham and Gao have shown the existence of intersonic mode I and supersonic mode II cracks. This motivated a continuum mechanics analysis of supersonic mode III cracks by Yang. Recent progress in the theoretical understanding of hyperelasticity in dynamic fracture has shown that supersonic crack propagation can only be understood by introducing a new length scale, called χ; which governs the process of energy transport near a crack tip. The crack dynamics is completely dominated by material properties inside a zone surrounding the crack tip with characteristic size equal to χ. When the material inside this characteristic zone is stiffened due to hyperelastic properties, cracks propagate faster than the longitudinal wave speed. The research group of Gao has used this concept to simulate the Broberg problem of crack propagation inside a stiff strip embedded in a soft elastic matrix. These simulations confirmed the existence of an energy characteristic length. This study also had implications for dynamic crack propagation in composite materials. If the characteristic size of the composite microstructure is larger than the energy characteristic length, χ; models that homogenize the materials into an effective continuum would be in significant error. The challenge arises of designing experiments and interpretative simulations to verify the energy characteristic length. Confirmation of the concept must be sought in the comparison of experiments on supersonic cracks and the predictions of the simulations and analysis. While much excitement rightly centres on the relatively new activity related to intersonic cracking, an old but interesting possibility remains to be incorporated in the modern work: for an interface between elastically dissimilar materials, crack propagation that is subsonic but exceeds the Rayleigh wave speed has been predicted for at least some combinations of the elastic properties of the two materials.

== See also ==
- Characteristic energy length scale
