= Yasuaki Ninomiya =

Japanese engineer

Yasuaki Ninomiya is a Japanese aircraft designer. He is the creator of the "WhiteWings" line of paperboard aircraft, described as "the Ferraris of paper airplanes" by a curator of the National Air and Space Museum.

== Early life ==
Ninomiya started creating paper airplanes when he was a child, and on Christmas Eve, 1966 learned that he could enter his designs in the First Great International Paper Airplane Contest. Pan American Airways offered to fly designs of paper airplanes that originated in Japan to the contest. He entered and, out of 12,000 entries from 28 countries, won in two categories: duration and distance.

== Career ==
Ninomiya’s designs have sold millions throughout Japan and the world. He is the author of a multi-volume work on high-performance paper aircraft.

He has a number of patents on aircraft design.
