= Red Bull Paper Wings =

Paper airplane contest

Red Bull Paper Wings is a world paper airplane championship which is held by Red Bull under the rules developed by the Paper Aircraft Association. From the late winter through spring, a series of qualifiers occur. The results of these qualifiers determine who will represent the national team in the world finals in May. The competition was first held in 2006. Contestants from over 99 countries from around the world qualified for the 2009 competition. The third Red Bull Paper Wings world finals took place on May 4–5, 2012. The final round of the competition takes place in Red Bull's Hangar 7 in Salzburg, Austria, and is monitored by Guinness Book of World Records officials.

The competition crowns champions in three categories: distance, hangtime, and aerobatics.

The two-time defending champion of the Paper Wings Distance competition is Ronin Ivan from Split, Croatia.

Until the most recent competition in 2022, the United States has had 15 representatives (5 in each of the 3 disciplines: time aloft, distance, and aerobatics). In 2022, this number was reduced to 7 (3 in distance, 3 in time aloft, and 1 in aerobatics). In the United States, there are multiple local qualifiers which correspond to 1 of 3 regions: east, west, and south. Winners of local qualifiers will compete in a national final. The top qualifier for distance and time aloft from each national final will represent the United States in the world finals. As for aerobatics, participants are judged from a submitted online video. The participant with the most votes will represent the United States in the aerobatics category.

The next Red Bull Paper Wings championship will likely take place in 2025.

== Event results ==
=== 2019 result ===
Event	1st place	2nd place
Distance	(United States) Jake Hardy	(Serbia) Lazar Krstić
Hangtime	(Australia) Cameron Clark	(Germany) Vince Scholl
Aerobatics	(Ukraine) Kateryna Ahafonova	(Taiwan) Seng Fatt Beh

=== 2022 result ===
Event	1st place	2nd place	3rd place
Distance	(Serbia) Lazar Krstić	(United Kingdom) Yicheng Sun	(Uzbekistan) Abduaziz Omonillaev
Hangtime	(Pakistan) Rana Muhammad Usman Saeed	(Chile) Esteban Neira	(Moldova) Dmitri Dimitrev
Aerobatics	(South Korea) Seunghoon Lee	(Taiwan) Seng Fatt Beh	(Japan) Taiga Kimura
