= TechEye =

British technology news website

- Available in: English
- Creators: Mike Magee, James Crowley, and Allan Rutherford
- Editor: Mike Magee
- Website: https://www.techeye.net/
- Commercial: Yes
- Launched: January 2010; 16 years ago

TechEye is a British technology news and opinion website. It was founded by Mike Magee, James Crowley, and Allan Rutherford in January 2010.
