= Ken Blackburn (aeronautical engineer) =

American aerospace engineer

- Born: March 24, 1963 (age 63)
- Education: North Carolina State University

Ken Blackburn (born March 24, 1963) is the former Guinness World Record holder for paper airplanes (time aloft). His first set the record in 1983 (16.89 seconds), resetting it in 1987 (17.2 sec), 1994 (18.8 sec) lost the record in 1996 and set the record of 27.6 seconds on 10/8/98 in the Georgia Dome.

He currently lives with his wife in Kodak, Tennessee and works for The Technology Service Corporation as an aeronautical engineer doing research on drones. He is married with no children, and has two dogs. He was born in Oxnard, California on March 24, 1963. His family moved around the country for a few years as dad worked for Western Electric. When he was about 4 years old, they settled in Kernersville, North Carolina on a 56-acre farm with horses, cows, chickens. He attended North Carolina State University from 1981 to 1985 when he graduated second in his class with his BS in Aeronautical Engineering. Then he accepted is job with McDonnell Douglas in St. Louis, Missouri working in fighter aircraft fuel system research. Two years later he switched to the aerodynamics department, where he has since worked on the YF-23, F/A-18, AV-8B, T-45, and research in the Phantom Works. The company merged with Boeing in 1997, so along the way he became a Boeing employee. In 2004 he left his job at Boeing to work for Jacobs Engineering at Eglin Air Force Base performing research on small unmanned air vehicles. In 2009 he performed the same duties working as a civil servant for the Air Force. In 2023 he began work for TSC on large drones.
