= FPG-9 =

Foam glider for flight modelling

The FPG-9 Foam Plate Glider is a simple, hand-launched glider made from a 9 inch (23 cm) foam dinner plate, featuring a moveable rudder and elevons, allowing for an inexpensive way to teach basic flight mechanics.

The model was created by Jack Reynolds, a volunteer at the Academy of Model Aeronautics' (AMA) National Model Aviation Museum. Originally the model was used as a hands-on activity for museum visitors and museum outreach. In 2004, the AMA incorporated the model into Aerolab, an instructional program developed for middle school physical science and math programs, that uses simple flying model aircraft as tools to teach Force and Motion.

Today, besides the AMA, numerous other groups are now using the FPG-9. It may be built and flown to satisfy an elective activity for the Boy Scouts of America Aviation merit badge. The Children's Museum of Indianapolis uses it as part of their CSI: Flight Adventures Project, an educational program highlighting the use of model aircraft as scientific tools for research for grades 3 - 5. The National Museum of the United States Air Force also uses the model as part of their educational programming to include Project Soar (Science in Ohio through Aerospace Resources).
