= Ken Blackburn (footballer) =

English footballer

Personal information
- Full name: Kenneth Alan Blackburn
- Date of birth: 13 May 1951 (age 75)
- Place of birth: Wembley, England
- Position: Centre forward

Youth career
- Cheltenham Town
- 1968–1969: Brighton & Hove Albion

Senior career*
Years	Team	Apps	(Gls)
1969–1970	Brighton & Hove Albion	1	(1)
1970–19??	Dover		
- Gloucester City
- * Club domestic league appearances and goals

Kenneth Alan Blackburn (born 13 May 1951) is an English former professional footballer who played as a centre forward in the Football League for Brighton & Hove Albion.

Born in Wembley, Middlesex, and raised in the west of England, Blackburn played both rugby and football to representative level as a schoolboy. He played for Cheltenham Town as a youngster, joined Brighton & Hove Albion as an apprentice, and made his debut on 3 March 1969 in the Third Division, scoring the last-minute winner away to Shrewsbury Town. That was his only first-team appearance. He turned professional in May 1969, but was released at the end of the following season and went on to play non-league football for clubs including Dover and Gloucester City. He took up coaching, and spent 19 years as head of youth football at Gloucester City before taking up a similar role at Tuffley Rovers in 2018.
