= Josephine de Karman =

Sister of Theodore von Kármán, benefactor of art foundation

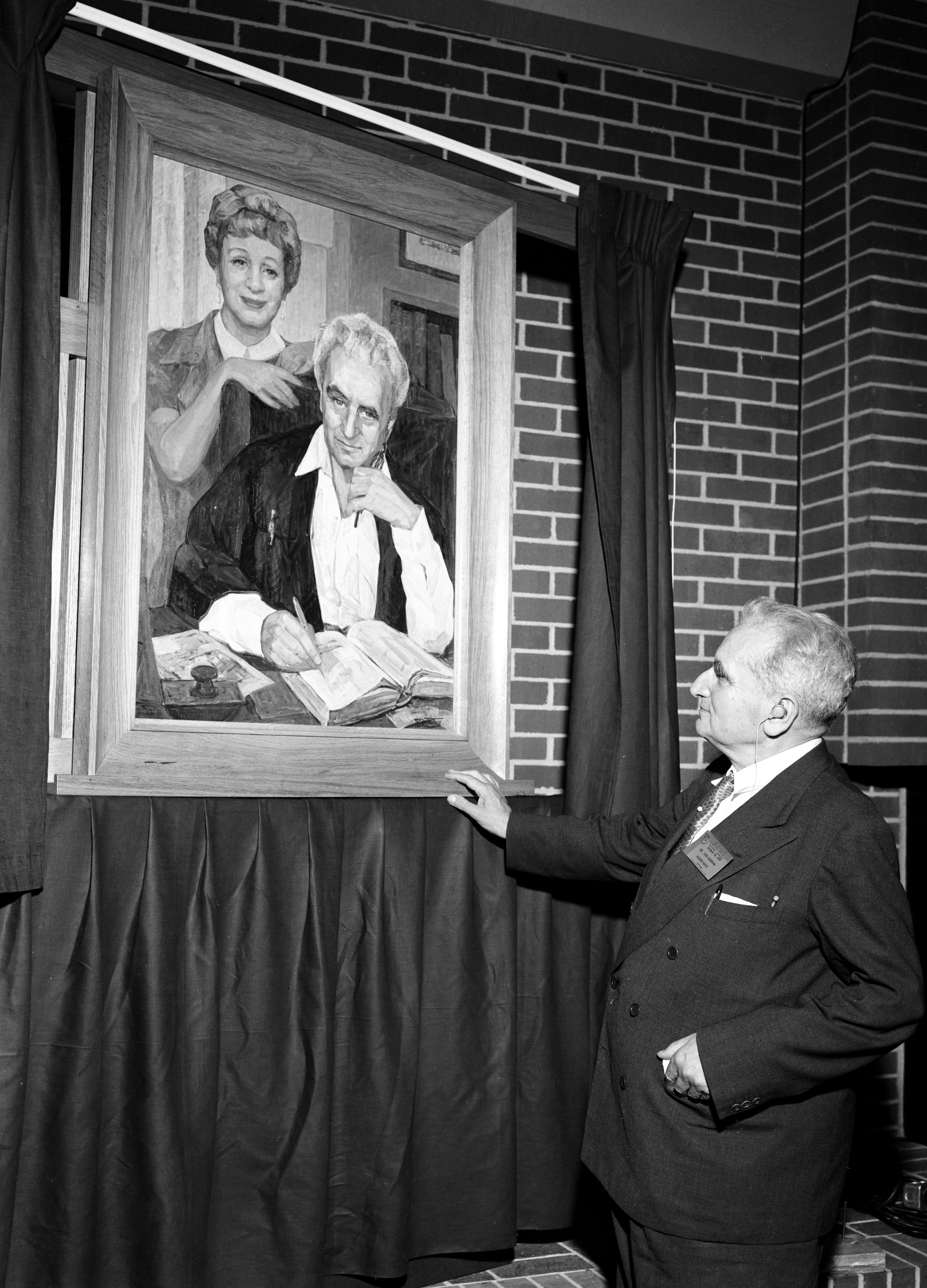
Theodore von Kármán looks at a painting of himself and his sister Josephine de Kármán

Josephine (Pipö) de Karman was the sister and life-partner of Theodore von Kármán. She is remembered as the benefactor of a foundation for art students.

Born in Budapest, Josephine was the younger sister of four brothers: Elemer, Feri, Tódor, and Miklos. She and her mother joined Theodore when he became director of the aerodynamics laboratory in Aachen, Germany. In 1925, they moved to their new home at Maastrichterlaan 11, in nearby Vaals, the Netherlands.

Our home in Vaals was similar to my father’s home in Buda. It had a huge high-ceilinged salon, a library, and numerous guest rooms. It was big, comfortable and altogether amiable. We eventually hired a Hungarian cook who became our most prized possession. My mother and my sister easily took over the organization of my social life, leaving me free for intellectual pursuits. … On weekends we threw open our home to students, assistants and visitors. My mother and my sister had made it a rule always to be prepared for unexpected guests, with coffee, cake, and slivovitz. In a short time, our home became a gemütlich meeting ground for a thousand ideas expressed, I must admit, at a high noise level in French, Italian, Hungarian, Dutch, English, and of course German. ... These sorties in internationalism were so successful that my sister suggested one day that we ought to do something to maintain regular contact with scientists in other countries ... because of the influence of our father who taught us to have a world view.

With the help of Tullio Levi-Civita of the University of Rome they organized for 1922 the "world’s first international conference in mechanics" in Innsbruck, Austria. Theodore recalled, "My sister and I paid the secretarial expenses out of our own pockets."

My sister, I must mention, was ideally equipped for international conferences. For one thing, she was blessed with a remarkable linguistic talent and not only spoke Hungarian, German, French, English, and Spanish fluently, but she had great facility in picking up new and strange tongues as well. I recall that on a Mediterranean cruise some years ago she found herself at home with Turkish ship’s personnel and was soon talking Turkish although she had never heard the language before.

When Theodore was recruited to direct the aerodynamics laboratory at Caltech in the US, the whole family moved:

Our home life in Pasadena was a continuation of life in Aachen. My mother and sister had found a sprawling Spanish-style home on Marengo Avenue, with a huge dining room and living room and two wings where we could live independently of one another but find a common meeting place around a large oak dining-room table. In a few months we threw open our doors to students and other visitors and thereby continued in Pasadena the international gemütlichkeit we had enjoyed so much in Aachen. ... My sister Pipö was fond of the movie colony and our guests included writers, producers and actors … Among other guests generally collected by my sister were spiritualists, magicians and other odd characters whom we found in great abundance in Southern California.

When Enrico Fermi was visiting Pasadena, he asked Theodore whether it would be possible to visit a movie studio. "Since my friends and those of my sister included a number of Hollywood personalities, notably the Hungarian actors Paul Lukas and Bela Lugosi, I had no difficulty arranging a luncheon for Fermi at the studios."

In 1951 Theodore and Pipö travelled to the dedication of the Arnold Engineering Center at Tullahoma, Tennessee. After the dedication, while travelling to New York, she had a heart attack. She died in Pasadena on 2 July 1951. It was then that Theodore realized who he had lost:

Little Pipö was not only my last family link to the past. She was also the organizer of the day-to-day details of my life, the sharer of my innermost feelings. She knew with an uncanny instinct when to keep me free from interruption when I was immersed in scientific work, and when to open the gate to entertainment and gaiety. I never realized until she was gone how close we were to each other and how much I depended on her.

Theodore was a founding partner of Aerojet corporation which grew rapidly. Unable to fund the growing operations, the founders were pressured to sell their stock in the company:

I continued to hold out for a number of months, but after some negotiation General Tire finally made a concession I could not resist. The firm promised to contribute over $50,000 to a foundation for worthy art students set up in the name of my sister Pipö, if I would sell my Aerojet holdings ... touched by the pleasing corporate nod to the memory of my dear sister, I relinquished my remaining shares in 1953.
