= Freestream =

The freestream is the air far upstream of an aerodynamic body, that is, before the body has a chance to deflect, slow down or compress the air. Freestream conditions are usually denoted with a $\infty$ symbol, e.g. $V_\infty$, meaning the freestream velocity.
