= Model aircraft =

Physical model of an aircraft for display, research, or amusement

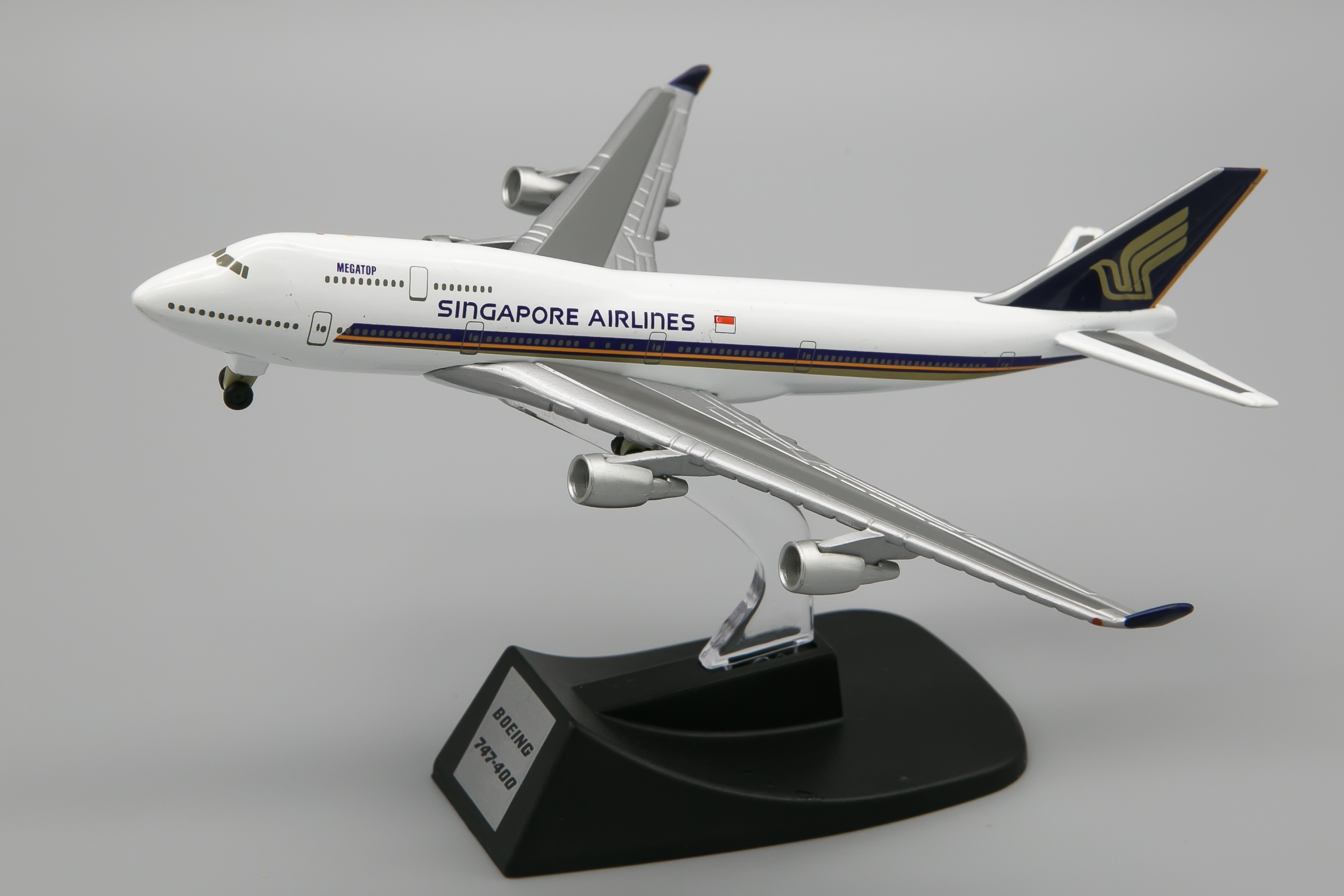
Singapore Airlines Boeing 747-400 scale display model

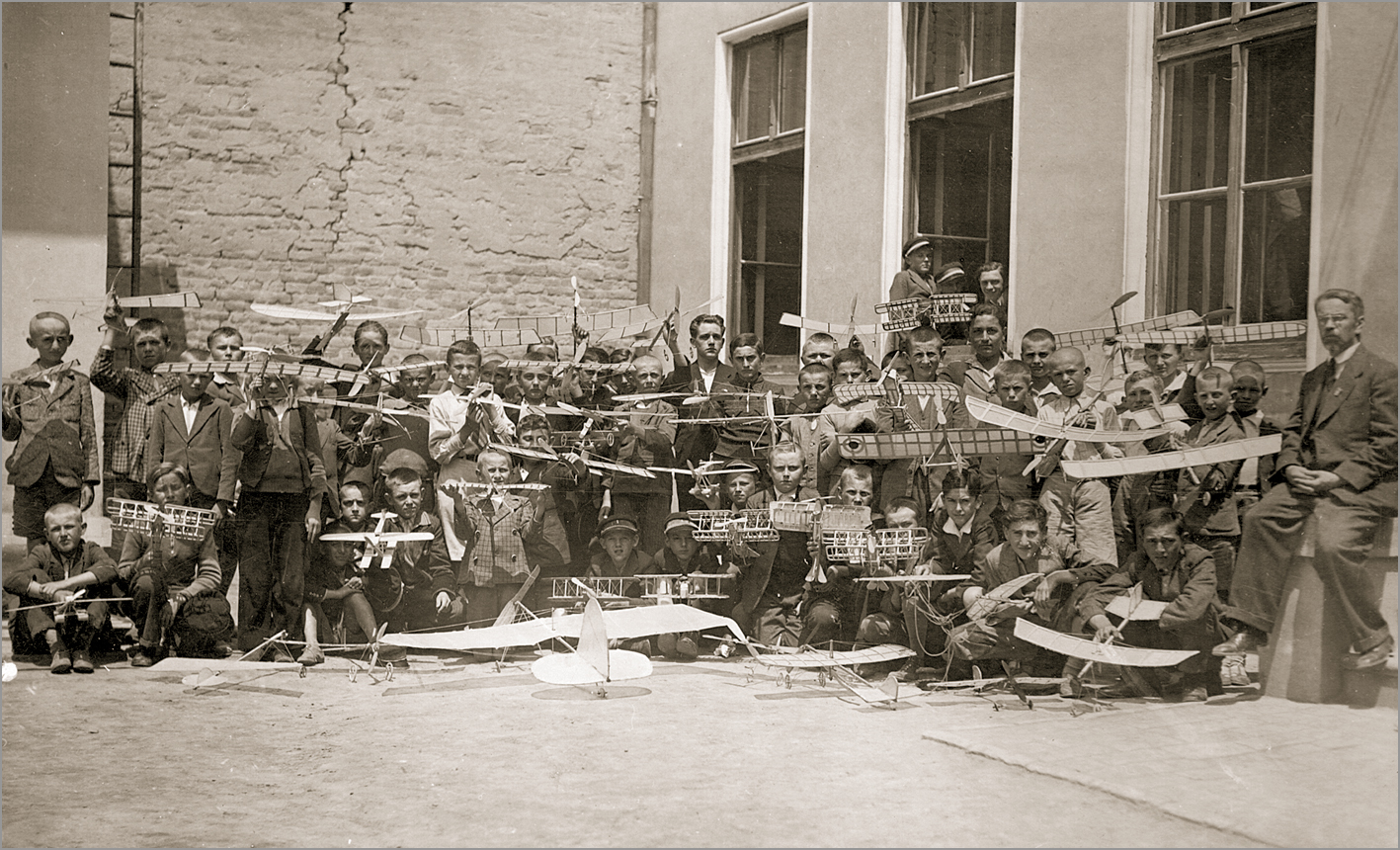
Group of students with their wooden model airplanes in Sonta, Serbia, 1936.

A model aircraft is a physical model of an existing or imagined aircraft, and is built typically for display, research, or amusement. Model aircraft are divided into two basic groups: flying and non-flying. Non-flying models are also termed static, display, or shelf models.

Aircraft manufacturers and researchers make wind tunnel models for testing aerodynamic properties, for basic research, or for the development of new designs. Sometimes only part of the aircraft is modelled.

Static models range from mass-produced toys in white metal or plastic to highly accurate and detailed models produced for museum display and requiring thousands of hours of work. Many are available in kits, typically made of injection-molded polystyrene or resin.

Flying models range from simple toy gliders made of sheets of paper, balsa, card stock or foam polystyrene to powered scale models built up from balsa, bamboo sticks, plastic, (including both molded or sheet polystyrene, and styrofoam), metal, synthetic resin, either alone or with carbon fiber or fiberglass, and skinned with either tissue paper, mylar and other materials. Some can be large, especially when used to research the flight properties of a proposed full scale aircraft.

== Aerodynamic research and mock-ups ==
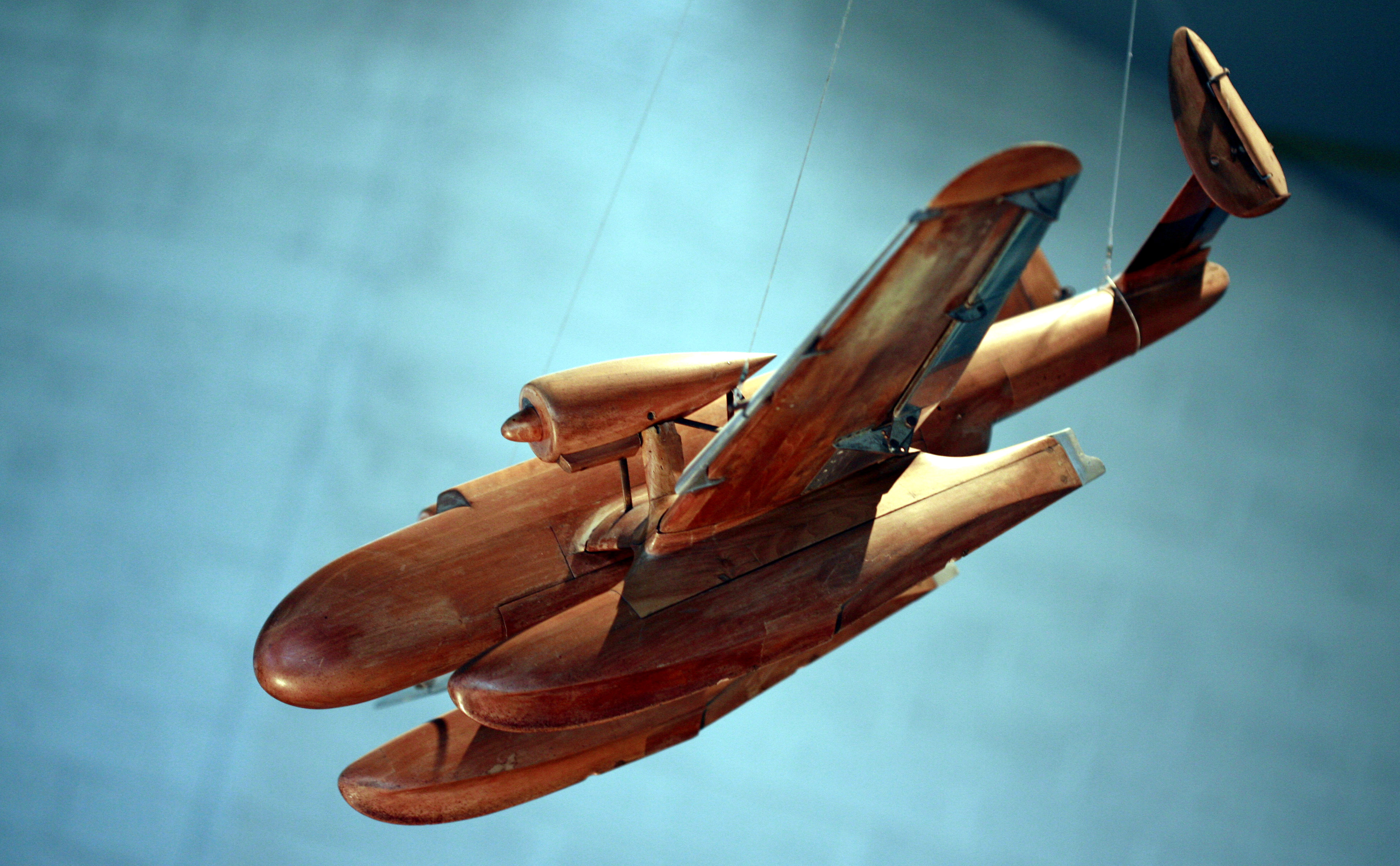
Wind tunnel model of a Loire-Nieuport LN-10 floatplane

Model aircraft are made for wind tunnel and free-flight research tests and often contain components that can be swapped to compare various fittings and configurations, or have features such as controls that can be repositioned to reflect various in flight configurations. They are also often fitted with sensors for spot measurements and are usually mounted on a structure that ensures the correct alignment with the airflow, and which provides additional measurements. For wind tunnel research, it is sometimes necessary only to make part of the proposed aircraft.

Full-scale static engineering models are also constructed for production development, often made of different materials from the proposed design. Again, often only part of the aircraft is modeled.

== Static display models ==
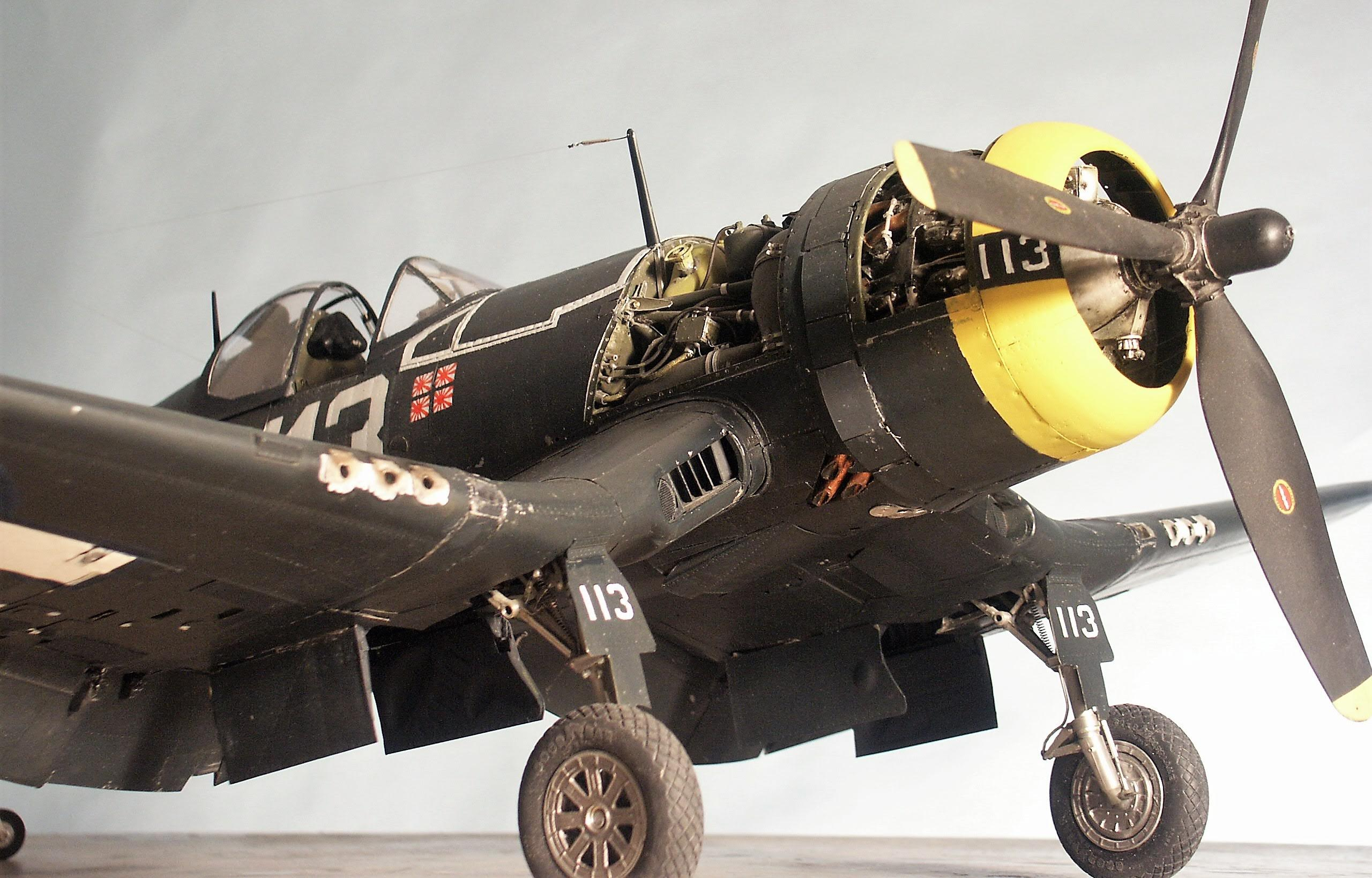
Vought F4U Corsair scratch-built aluminum model plane by Guillermo Rojas Bazan

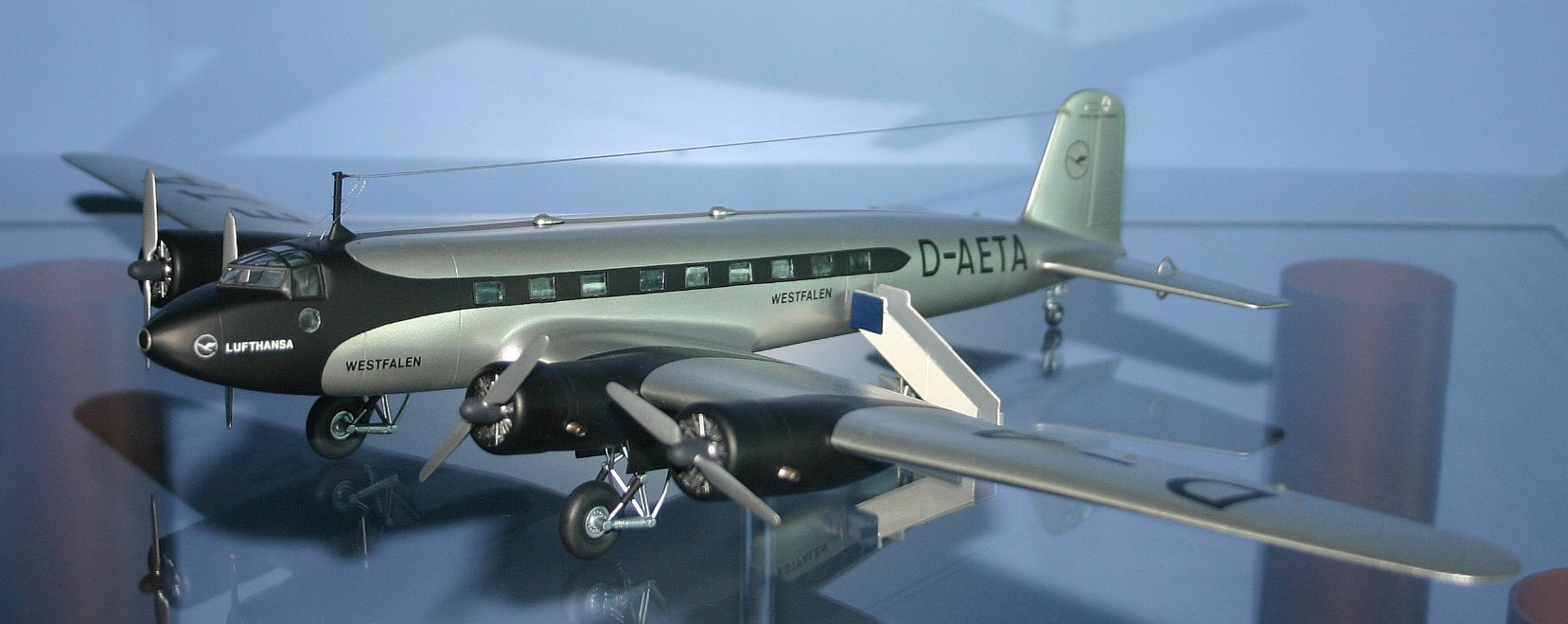
Lufthansa Focke-Wulf Fw 200 Condor model on display

Static model aircraft cannot fly, and are used for display, education and are used in wind tunnels to collect data for the design of full scale aircraft. They may be built using any suitable material, which often includes plastic, wood, metal, paper and fiberglass and may be built to a specific scale, so that the size of the original may be compared to that of other aircraft. Models may come finished, or may require painting or assembly, with glue, screws, or by clipping together, or both.

Many of the world's airlines allow their aircraft to be modelled for publicity. Airlines used to order large scale models of their aircraft to supply them to travel agencies as a promotional item. Desktop model airplanes may be given to airport, airline and government officials to promote an airline or celebrate a new route or an achievement.

=== Scale ===
Static model aircraft are primarily available commercially in a variety of scales from as large as 1:18 scale to as small as 1:1250 scale. Plastic model kits requiring assembly and painting are primarily available in 1:144, 1:72, 1:48, 1:32, and 1:24 scale. Die-cast metal models (pre-assembled and factory painted) are available in scales ranging from 1:48 to 1:600.

Scales are not random, but are generally based on divisions of either the Imperial system, or the Metric system. For example, 1:48 scale is 1/4" to 1-foot (or 1" to 4 feet) and 1:72 is 1" to 6 feet, while in metric scales such as 1:100th, 1 centimeter equals 1 meter. 1:72 scale was introduced with Skybirds wood and metal model aircraft kits in 1932 and were followed closely by Frog, which used the same scale from 1936 with their "Frog Penguin" brand. 1:72 was popularized in the US during the Second World War by the US War Department after it requested models of commonly encountered single engine aircraft at that scale, and multi-engine aircraft in 1:144th scale. They hoped to improve aircraft recognition skills and these scales compromised between size and detail. After WWII, manufacturers continued with these scales, however kits are also added in other divisions of the imperial system. 1:50th and 1:100th are common in Japan and France, which both use Metric. Promotional models for airlines are produced in scales ranging from 1:200 to 1:1200.

Some manufacturers made 1:18th scale aircraft to go with cars of the same scale. Aircraft models, military vehicles, figures, cars, and trains all have different common scales but there is some crossover. There is a substantial amount of duplication of more famous subjects in different scales, which can be useful for forced perspective box dioramas.

Older models often did not conform to an established scale as they were sized to fit the box, and are referred to as being to "Box Scale".

=== Materials ===
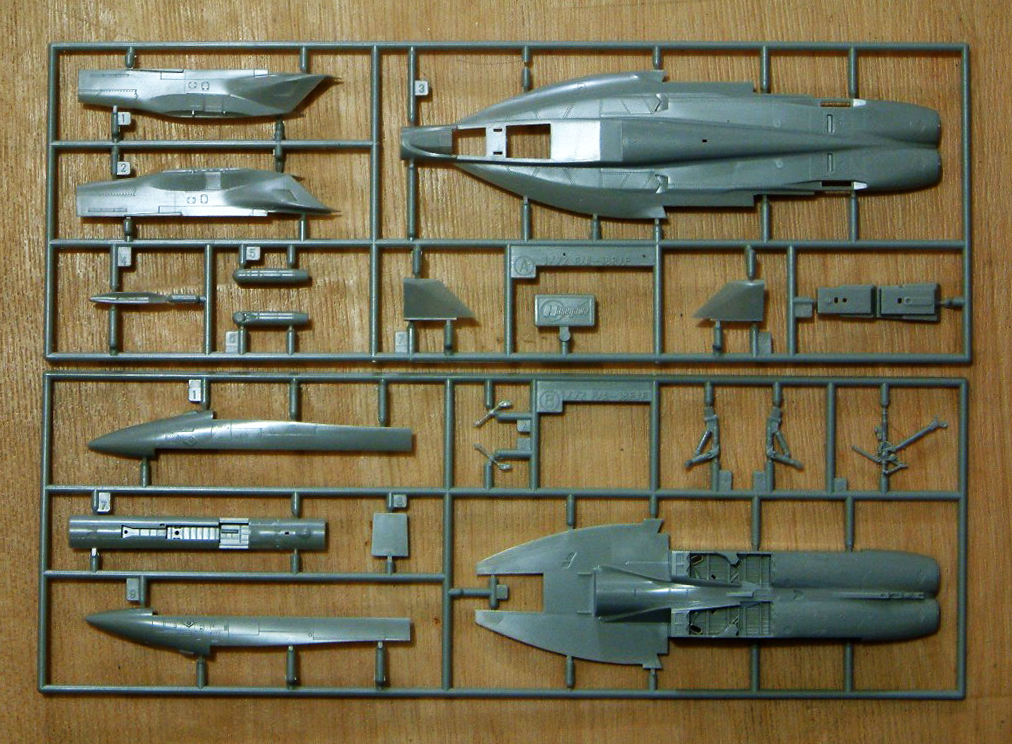
Parts for a plastic model airplane still on their injection molding tree

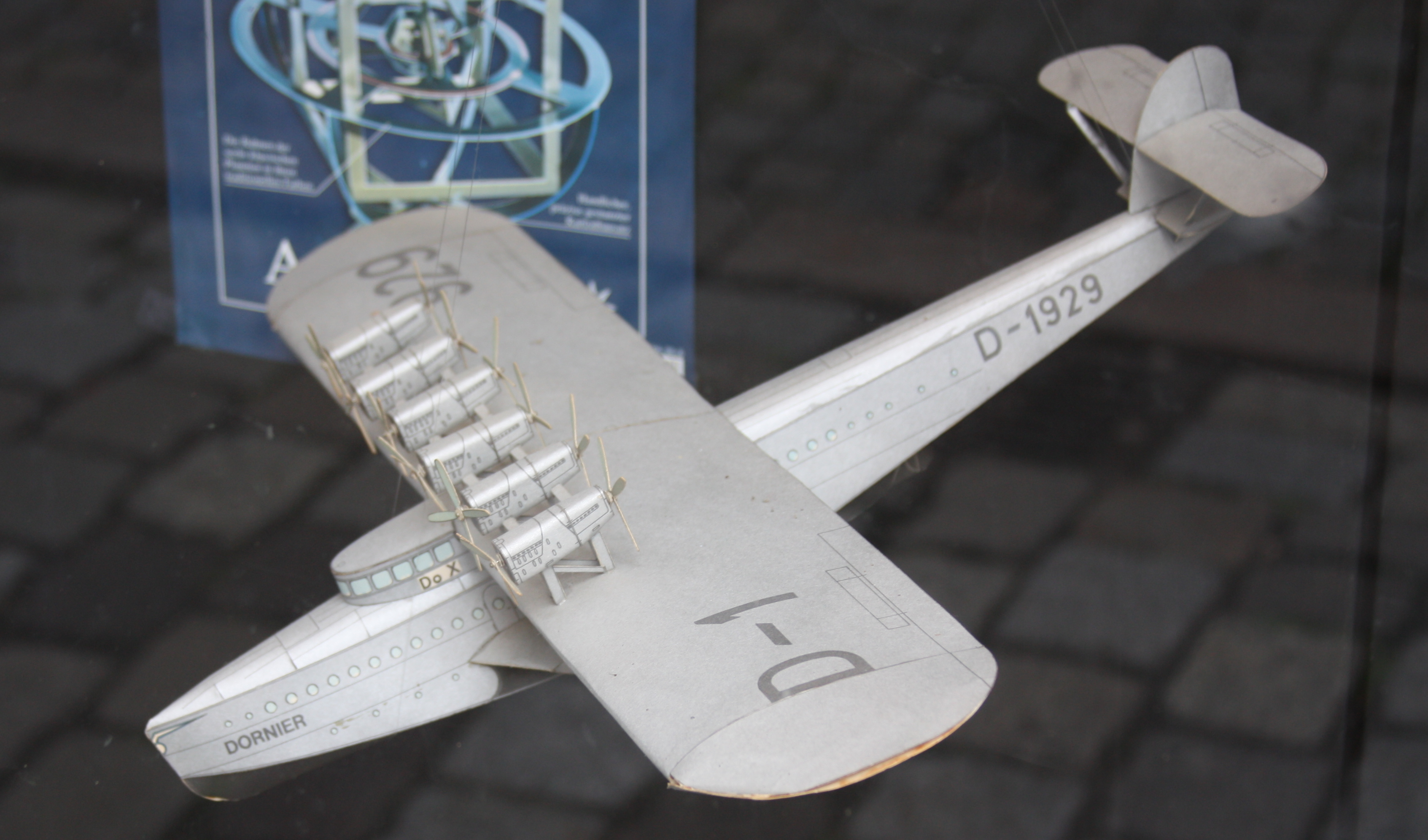
Paper model of Dornier X flying boat

The most common form of manufacture for kits is injection molded polystyrene plastic, formed in steel forms. Plastic pellets are heated into a liquid and forced into the mold under high pressure through trees that hold all the parts, and ensure plastic flows to every part of the mold. This allows a greater degree of automation than other manufacturing processes but molds require large production runs to cover the cost of making them. Today, this takes place mostly in Asia and Eastern Europe. Smaller runs are possible with copper molds, and some companies use resin or rubber molds, but while the cost is lower for the mold, the durability is also lower and labor costs can be much higher.

Resin kits are made in forms similar to those used for limited run plastic kits, but these molds are usually not as durable, which limits them to smaller production runs, and prices for the finished product are higher.

Vacuum forming is another common alternative but requires more skill, and details must be supplied by the modeller. There is a handful of photo etched metal kits that allow a high level of detail and they are unable to replicate compound curves.

Scale models can also be made from paper or card stock. Commercial models are mainly printed by publishers in Germany or Eastern Europe but can be distributed through the internet, some of which are offered this way for free.

From World War I through the 1950s, static model airplanes were also built from light weight bamboo or balsa wood and covered with tissue paper in the same manner as with flying models. This was a time-consuming process that mirrored the actual construction of airplanes through the beginning of World War II. Many model makers would create models from drawings of the actual aircraft.

Ready-made desk-top models include those produced in fiberglass for travel agents and aircraft manufacturers, as well as collectors models made from die-cast metal, mahogany, resin and plastic.

Carbon fibers and fiberglass have become increasingly common in model aircraft kits. In model helicopters, main frames and rotor blades are often made from carbon fiber, along with ribs and spars in fixed-wing aircraft wings.

== Flying models ==
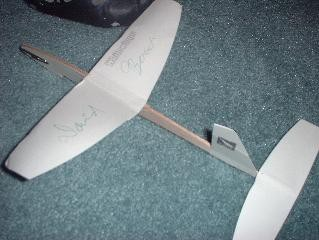
A free-flight hand-launched glider

Aeromodelling is the building and operation of flying model aircraft. Some flying models resemble scaled down versions of full scale aircraft, while others are built with no intention of looking like real aircraft. There are also models of birds, bats and pterosaurs (usually ornithopters). The reduced size affects the model's Reynolds number, which determines how the air reacts when flowing past the model, and compared to a full sized aircraft the size of control surfaces needed, the stability and the effectiveness of specific airfoil sections may differ considerably requiring changes to the design.

=== Control ===
Flying model aircraft are generally controlled through one of three methods

- Free flight (F/F) model aircraft are uncontrolled other than by control surfaces that must be preset before flight, and must have a high degree of natural stability. Most free flying models are either unpowered gliders or rubber powered. These pre-date manned flight.
- Control line (C/L) model aircraft use strings or wires to tether the model to a central pivot, either held by hand or to a pole. The aircraft then flies in circles around that point, secured by one cable, while a second provides pitch control through a connection to the elevator. Some use a third cable to control a throttle. There are many competition categories. Speed flying is divided into classes based on engine displacement. Class 'D' 60 size speed planes can easily reach speeds well in excess of 150 mph (240 km/h).
- Radio-controlled aircraft have a controller who operates a transmitter that sends signals to a receiver in the model to actuate servos that adjust the model's flight controls similarly to a full sized aircraft. Traditionally, the radio signal directly controlled servos, however, modern examples often use flight control computers to stabilize the model or even to fly it autonomously. This is particularly the case with quadcopters. Rudimentary flight controllers were first introduced in model helicopters, with standalone electronic gyroscopes used stabilize the tail rotor control. Much like quadcopters, this has now extended to all flight controls.

=== Construction ===
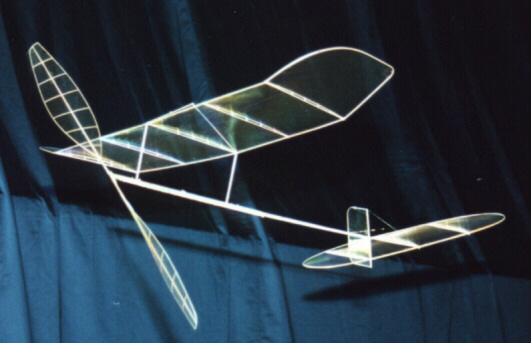
Extremely light F1D-class indoor-flight model with microfilm covering

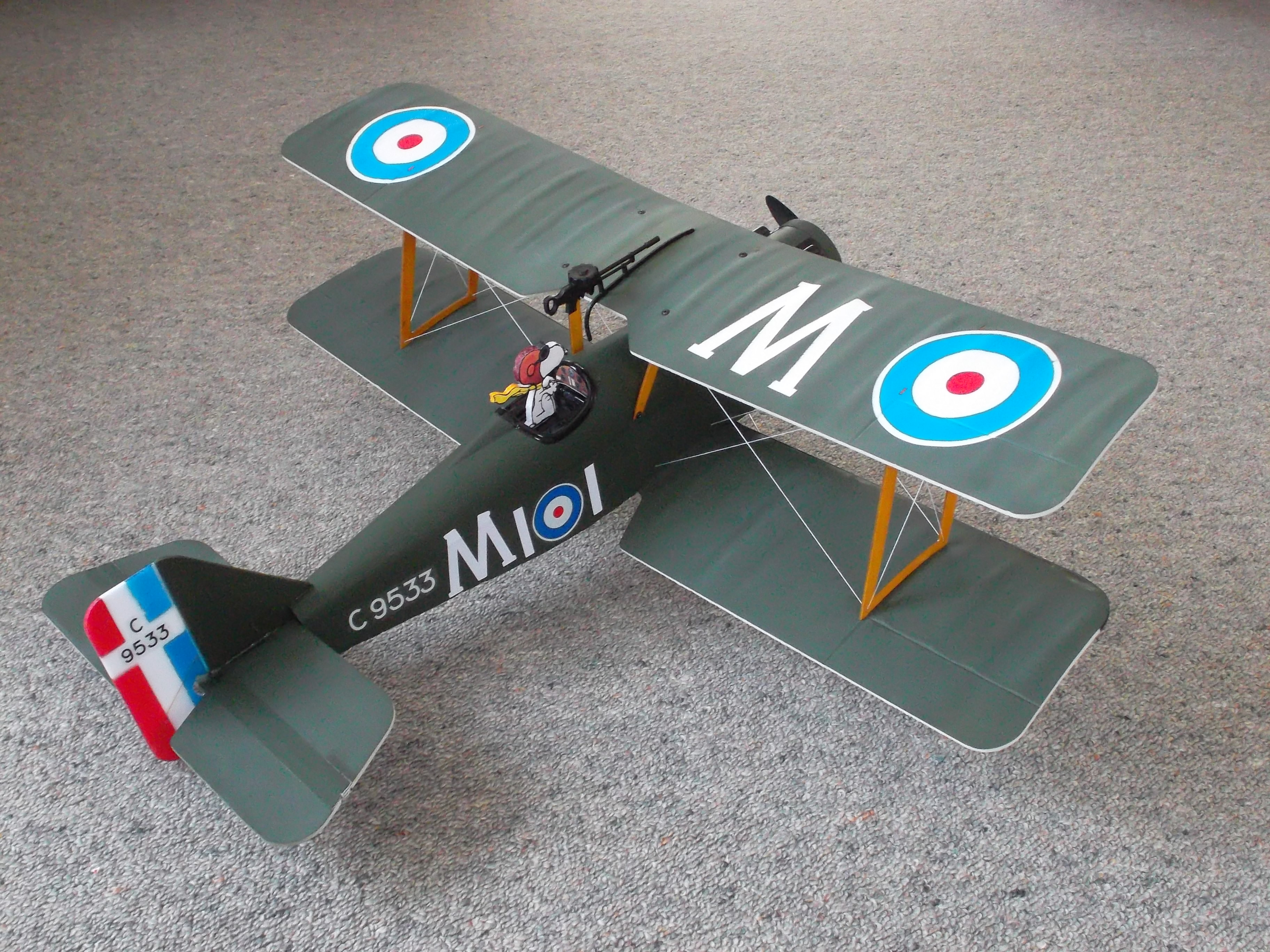
Flying model of a WW1 Royal Aircraft Factory S.E.5a with foam flying surfaces, from a kit. With added Snoopy figure

Flying models construction may differ from that of static models as both weight and strength are major considerations.

Flying models borrow construction techniques from full-sized aircraft although the use of metal is limited. These might consist of forming a frame using thin planks of a light wood such as balsa to duplicate the formers, longerons, spars, and ribs of a vintage full-size aircraft, or, on larger (usually powered) models where weight is less of a factor, sheets of wood, expanded polystyrene, and wood veneers may be employed. It is then given a smooth sealed surface, usually with aircraft dope. For light models, tissue paper is used. For larger models (usually powered and radio controlled) heat-curing or heat shrink covering plastic films or heat-shrinkable synthetic fabrics are applied to the model. Microfilm covering is used for the lightest models and is made by spreading few drops of lacquer out over several square feet of water, and lifting a wire loop through it, which creates a thin plastic film. Flying models can be assembled from kits, built from plans, or made completely from scratch. A kit contains the necessary raw material, typically die- or laser-cut wood parts, some molded parts, plans, assembly instructions and may have been flight tested. Plans are intended for the more experienced modeller, since the builder must make or find the materials themselves. Scratch builders may draw their own plans, and source all the materials themselves. Any method may be labor-intensive, depending on the model in question.

To increase the hobby's accessibility, some vendors offer Almost Ready to Fly (ARF) models that minimize the skills required, and reduce build time to under 4 hours, versus 10–40 or more for a traditional kit. Ready To Fly (RTF) radio control aircraft are also available, however model building remains integral to the hobby for many. For a more mass market approach, foamies, injection-molded from lightweight foam (sometimes reinforced) have made indoor flight more accessible and many require little more than attaching the wing and landing gear.

=== Gliders ===
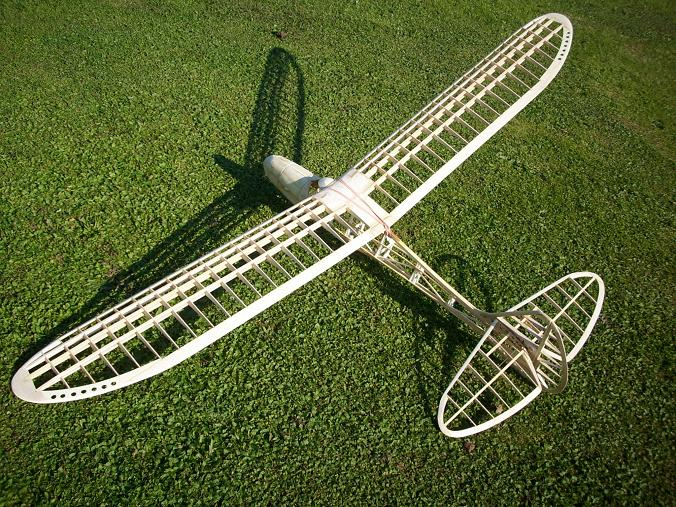
model glider showing typical internal structure

Gliders do not have an attached powerplant. Larger outdoor model gliders are usually radio-controlled gliders and hand-winched against the wind by a line attached to a hook under the fuselage with a ring, so that the line drops when the model is overhead. Other methods include catapult-launching, using an elastic bungee cord. The newer "discus" style of wingtip hand-launching has largely supplanted the earlier "javelin" type of launch. Also using ground-based power winches, hand-towing, and towing aloft using a second powered aircraft.

Gliders sustain flight through exploitation of the wind in the environment. A hill or slope often produces updrafts of air that sustain the flight of a glider. This is called slope soaring, and radio controlled gliders can remain airborne for as long as the updraft remains. Another means of attaining height in a glider is exploitation of thermals, which are columns of warm rising air created by differences of temperature on the ground such as between an asphalt parking lot and a lake. Heated air rises, carrying the glider with it. As with a powered aircraft, lift is obtained by the action of the wings as the aircraft moves through the air, but in a glider, height is gained by flying through air that is rising faster than the aircraft is sinking.

Walkalong gliders are lightweight model airplanes flown in the ridge lift produced by the pilot following in close proximity. In other words, the glider is slope soaring in the updraft of the moving pilot (see also Controllable slope soaring).

=== Power sources ===
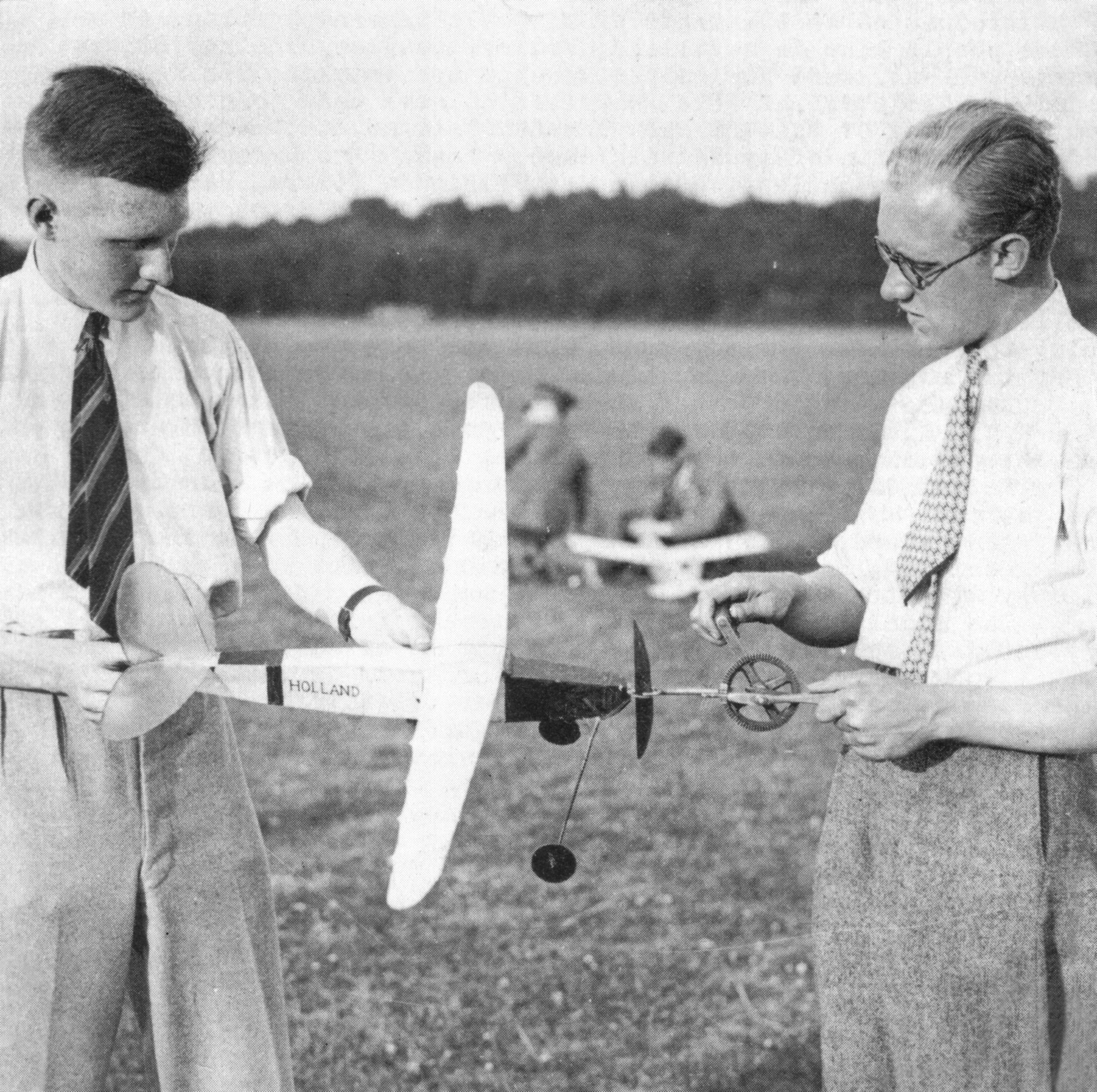
Typical rubber powered model having the rubber band (hidden in the fuselage) tightened by turning the propeller backward, here being done with a handcrank

Powered models contain an onboard powerplant, a mechanism powering propulsion of the aircraft through the air. Electric motors and internal combustion engines are the most common propulsion systems, but other types include rocket, small turbine, pulsejet, compressed gas, and tension-loaded (twisted) rubber band devices.

==== Rubber ====
The oldest method of powering free flight models is Alphonse Pénaud's elastic motor (or extensible motor) of 1871, essentially a long rubber band that is twisted to add tension, prior to flight. It is the most widely used powerplant, found on everything from children's toys to competition models. The elastic offers simplicity and durability, but has a short running time, and the initial high torque of a fully wound motor drops sharply before plateauing to a steady output, until the final turns unwind and power drops off completely. Using it efficiently is one of the challenges of competitive free-flight rubber flying, and variable-pitch propellers, differential wing and tailplane incidence and rudder settings, controlled by timers, can help to manage the torque. There are also usually motor weight restrictions in contest classes. Even so, models have achieved flights of nearly 1 hour.

==== Compressed gases ====
Stored compressed gas, typically carbon dioxide (CO_{2}), can power simple models in a manner similar to filling a balloon and then releasing it. Compressed CO_{2} may also be used to power an expansion engine to turn a propeller. These engines can incorporate speed controls and multiple cylinders, and are capable of powering lightweight scale radio-controlled aircraft. Gasparin and Modela are two recent makers of CO_{2} engines. CO_{2}, like rubber, is known as "cold" power because it generates no heat.

Steam is even older than rubber power, and like rubber, contributed much to aviation history, but is now rarely used. In 1848, John Stringfellow flew a steam-powered model, in Chard, Somerset, England. Samuel Pierpont Langley built both steam- and internal-combustion-powered models that made long flights.

Baronet Sir George Cayley built, and flew, internal and external combustion gunpowder-fueled model aircraft engines in 1807, 1819, and 1850. These had no crank, working ornithopter-like flappers instead of a propeller. He speculated that the fuel might be too dangerous for manned aircraft.

==== Internal combustion ====
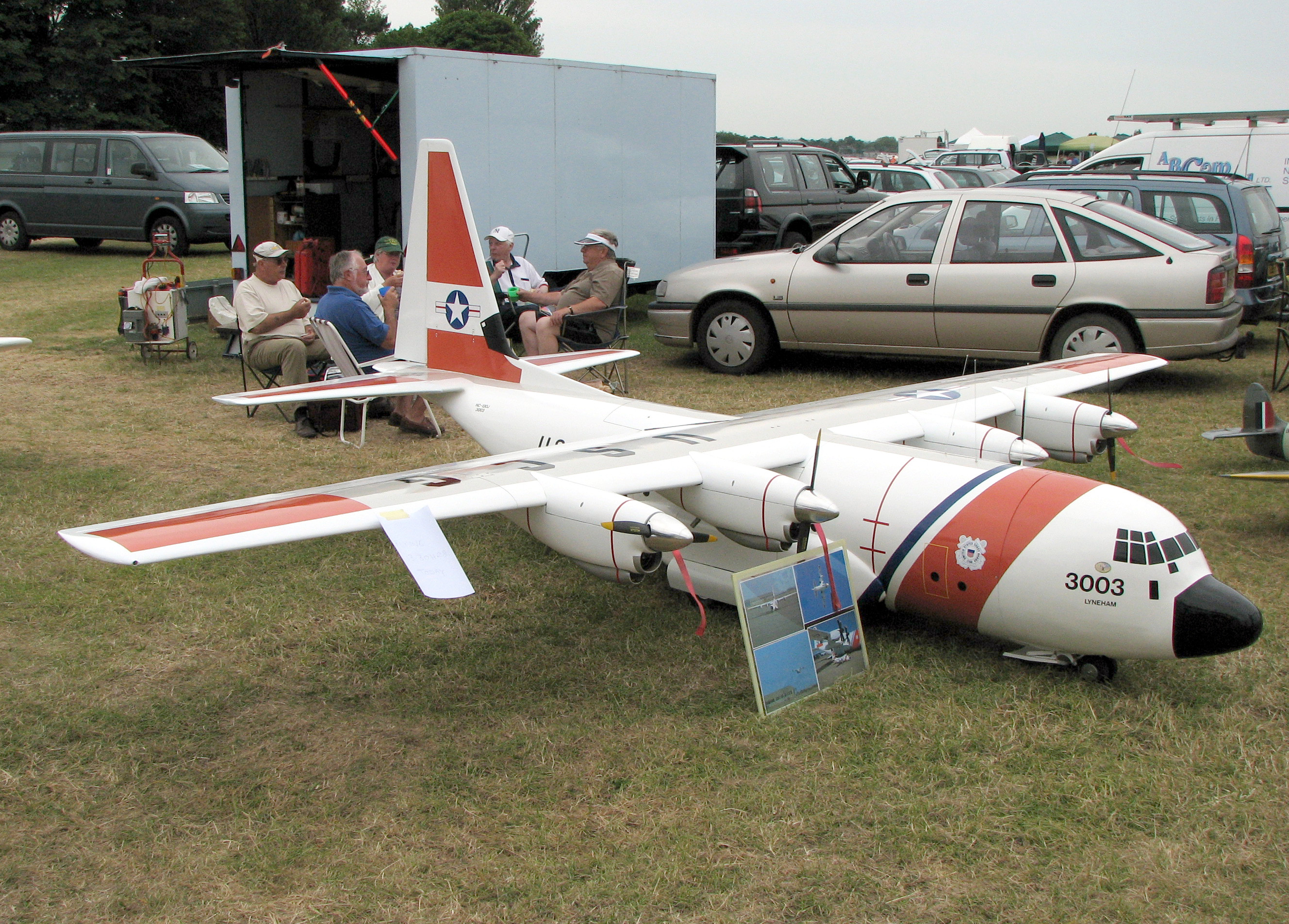
"Giant scale" 18 feet 6 inches (5.64 m) wingspan Lockheed C-130 Hercules radio control flying model powered with four internal combustion engines. A crew of five fly and maintain it.

For larger and heavier models, the most popular powerplant is the glow plug engine. Glow engines are fueled by a mixture of slow burning methanol, nitromethane, and lubricant (castor oil or synthetic oil), which is sold pre-mixed as glow-fuel. Glow-engines require an external starting mechanism; the glow plug must be heated until it is hot enough to ignite fuel to start. Reciprocating cylinders apply torque to a rotating crankshaft, which is the engine's primary power-output. Some power is lost from converting linear motion to rotary and in lost heat and unburned fuel, so efficiency is low.

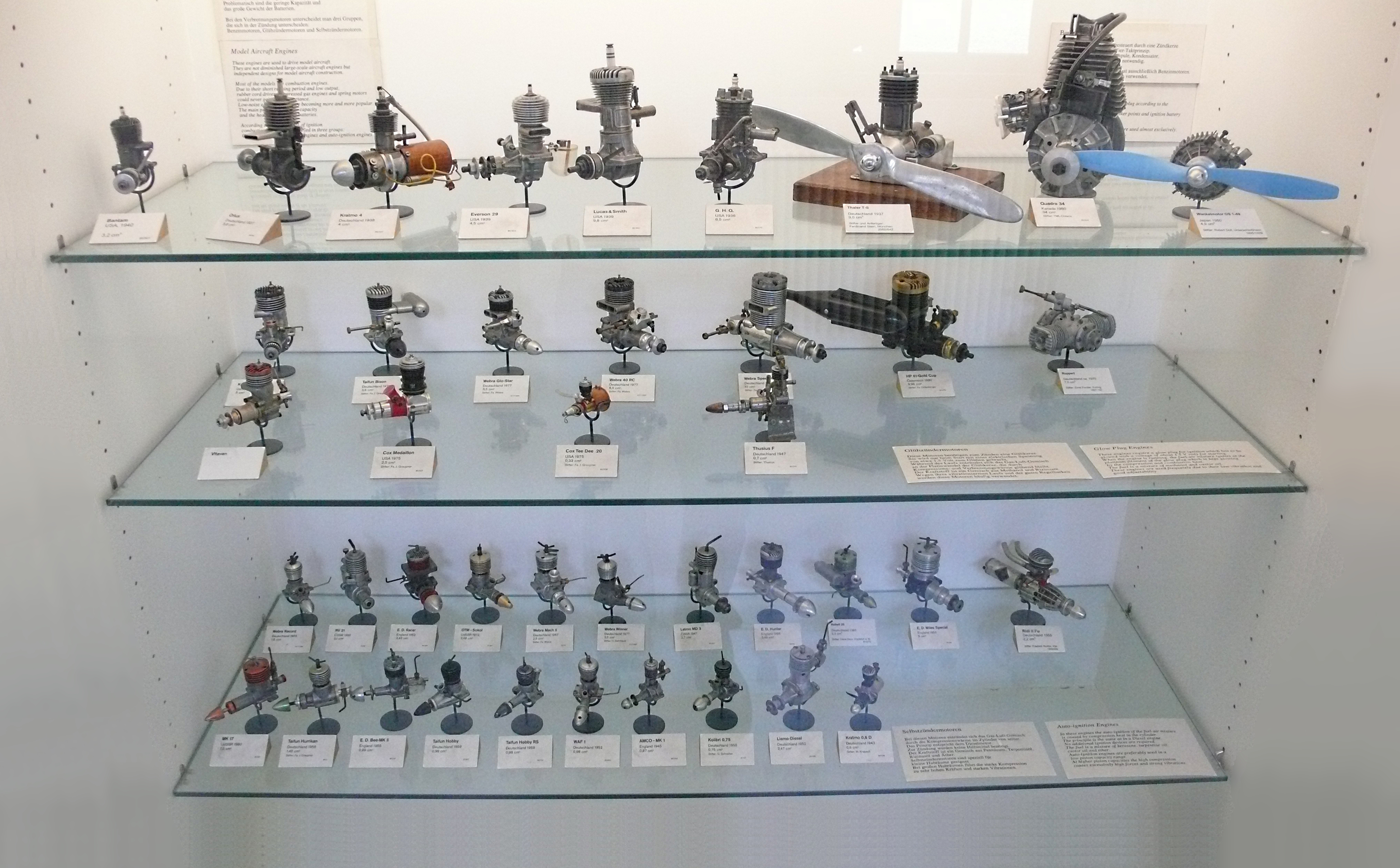
Model Aircraft Engines

These are rated by engine displacement and range from 0.01 cu in (0.16 cc) to over 1.0 cu in (16 cc). The smallest engines can spin a 3.5 inches (8.9 cm) propeller to over 30,000 rpm, while the larger engines turn at 10–14,000 rpm.

The simplest glow-engines use the two-stroke cycle. These engines are inexpensive, and offer the highest power-to-weight ratio of all glow-engines, but are noisy and require substantial expansion chamber mufflers, which may be tuned. four-stroke cycle glow engines, whether using poppet valves or more rarely rotary valves are more fuel-efficient, but deliver less power than similar two-stroke engines. The power they deliver is more suited to turning larger diameter propellers for lighter weight, higher drag airframes such as with in biplanes. Four-stroke engines are now popular as they are quieter than two-stroke engines, and are available in horizontally opposed twins and radial engine configurations. Variations include engines with multiple-cylinders, spark-ignition gasoline operation, carbureted diesel operation and variable compression-ratio engines. Diesels are preferred for endurance and have higher torque, and for a given capacity, can "swing" a larger propeller than a glow engine. Home manufacture of model aircraft engines is a hobby in its own right.

==== Jets and rockets ====
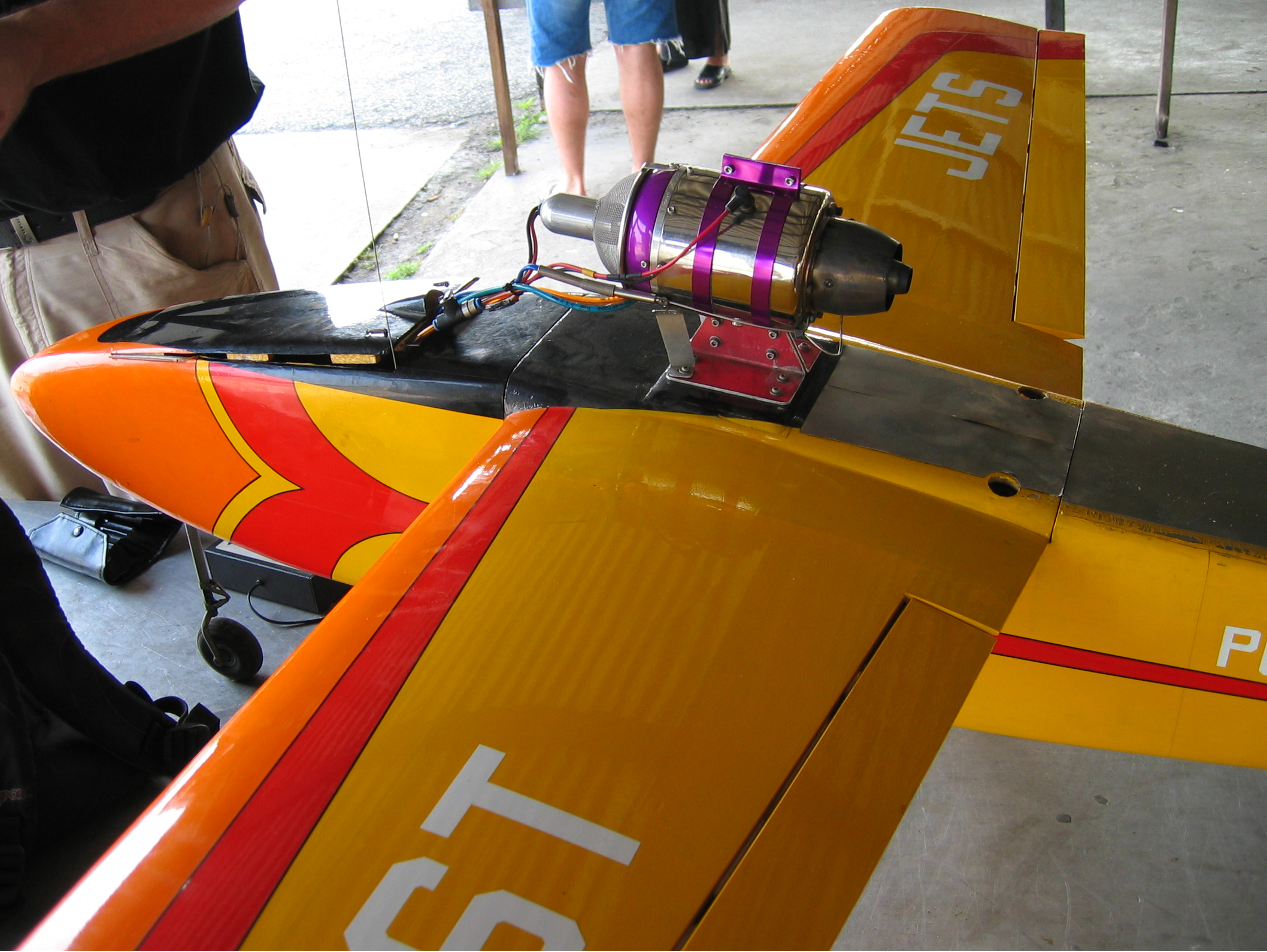
Miniature jet turbine

Early "jet" style model aircraft used a multi-blade propeller ducted fan, inside ductwork, usually in the fuselage. The fans were generally powered by 2 stroke engines at high RPM. They generally had 0.40 to 0.90 cu in (6.6 to 14.7 cc) displacements, but some were as small as 0.049 cu in (0.80 cc). This fan-in-tube design has been adopted successfully for electric-powered jets while glow engine powered ducted-fan aircraft are now rare. Small jet turbine engines are now used in hobbyist models that resemble simplified versions of the turbojet engines found on commercial aircraft, but are not scaled-down as Reynolds numbers come into play. The first hobbyist-developed turbine was developed and flown in the 1980s but recently have commercial examples become readily available. Turbines require specialized design and precision-manufacturing, and some have been built from car engine turbocharger units. Owning or operating a turbine-powered aircraft is prohibitively expensive and many national clubs (as with the USA's Academy of Model Aeronautics) require members to be certified to safely use them. V-1 flying bomb type Pulsejet engines have also been used as they offer more thrust in a smaller package than a traditional glow-engine, but are not widely used due to the extremely high noise levels they produce, and are illegal in some countries.

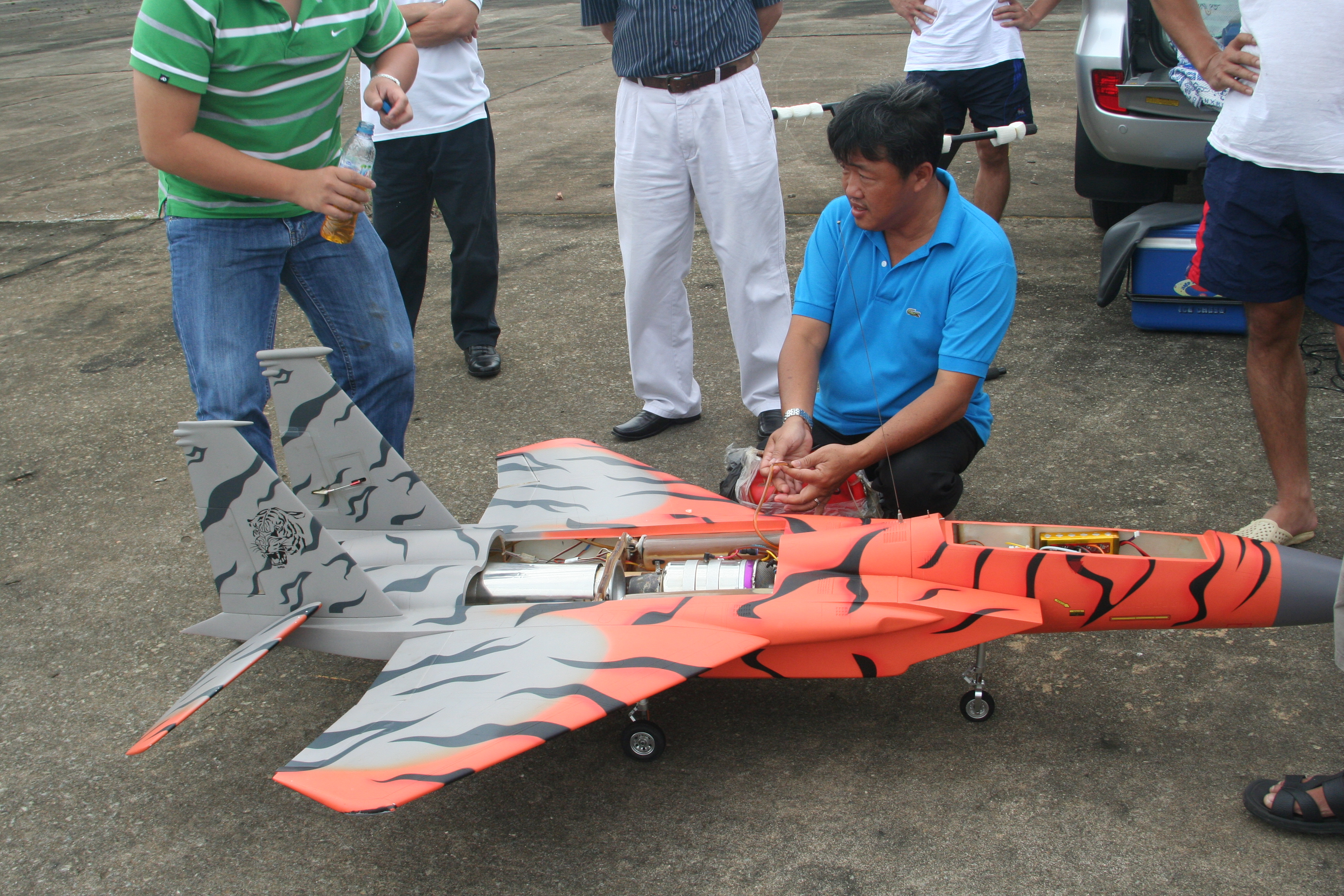
A Vietnamese pilot prepares his model jet (Bien Hoa Air Base, Vietnam)

Rocket engines are sometimes used to boost gliders and sailplanes. The earliest purpose-built rocket motor dates back to the 1950s, with the introduction of the Jetex motor, which used solid fuel pellets, ignited by a wick fuse, in a reusable casing. Flyers can now also use single-use model rocket engines to provide a short, under 10 second burst of power. Government restrictions in some countries made rocket-propulsion rare but these were being eased in many places and their use was expanding, however a reclassification from "smoke producing devices" to "fireworks" has made them difficult to obtain again.

==== Electric power ====
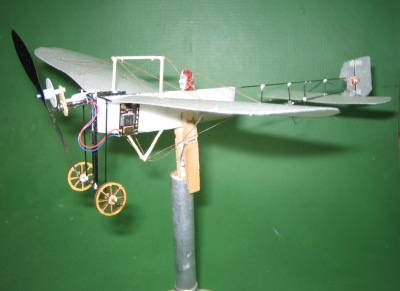
Small electric powered model of a pre-WW1 era Bleriot XI

Electric-powered models use an electric motor powered by a source of electricity - usually a battery. Electrical power began being used on models in the 1970s, but the cost delayed widespread use until the early 1990s, when more efficient battery technologies, and brushless motors became available, while the costs of motors, batteries and control systems dropped dramatically. Electric power now predominated with park-flyer and 3D-flyer models, both of which are small and light, where electric-power offers greater efficiency and reliability, less maintenance and mess, quieter flight and near-instantaneous throttle response compared to internal combustion engines.

The first electric models used brushed DC motors and nickel cadmium (NiCad) rechargeable cells that gave flight times of 5 to 10 minutes, while a comparable glow-engine provided double the flight-time. Later electric systems used more-efficient brushless DC motors and higher-capacity nickel metal hydride (NiMh) batteries, yielding considerably improved flight times. Cobalt and lithium polymer batteries (LiPoly or LiPo) permit electric flight-times to surpass those of glow-engines, while the more rugged and durable, cobalt-free lithium iron phosphate batteries are also becoming popular. Solar power has also become practical for R/C hobbyists, and in June 2005 a record flight of 48 hours and 16 minutes was set in California. It is now possible to power most models under 20 lb (9.1 kg) with electric power for a cost equivalent to or lower than traditional power sources.

Recent developments have resulted in the use of brushless three-phase motors in model aviation. Brushless motors are more powerful and offer greater torque and efficiency. The design of brushless motors also means less internal friction, as there is no requirement for brushes to be in contact with any rotating parts. This increase in efficiency results in longer flight times.

=== Propulsion types ===
Most powered model-aircraft, including electric, internal-combustion, and rubber-band powered models, generate thrust by spinning an airscrew. The propeller is the most commonly used device. Propellers generate thrust due to lift generated by the wing-like sections of the blades, which forces air backward.

==== Propellers ====
A large diameter and low-pitch propeller offers greater thrust and acceleration at low airspeed, while a small diameter and higher-pitch propeller sacrifices acceleration for higher maximum speeds. The builder can choose from a selection of propellers to match the model but a mismatched propeller can compromise performance, and if too heavy, cause undue wear on the powerplant. Model aircraft propellers are usually specified as diameter × pitch, in inches. For example, a 5 x 3 propeller has a diameter of 5 inches (130 mm), and a pitch of 3 inches (76 mm). The pitch is the distance that the propeller would advance if turned through one revolution in a solid medium. Two and three bladed propellers are the most common.

Three methods are used to transfer energy to the propeller:

- Direct-drive systems have the propeller attached directly to the engine's crankshaft or driveshaft. This arrangement is preferred when the propeller and powerplant both operate near peak efficiency at similar rpms. Direct-drive is most common with fuel-powered engines. Rarely, some electric motors are designed with a sufficiently high torque and low enough speed and can utilize direct-drive as well. These motors are typically called outrunners.
- Reduction drive uses gears to reduce shaft rpm, so the motor can spin much faster. The higher the gear ratio, the slower the prop rotates, which also increases torque by roughly the same ratio. This is common on larger models and on those with unusually large propellers. The reduction drive matches the powerplant and propeller to their respective optimum operating speeds. Geared propellers are rare on internal combustion engines, but are common on electric motors because most electric motors spin extremely fast, but lack torque.
- A built-in 2:1 gear reduction ratio can be obtained by attaching the propeller to the camshaft rather than the crankshaft of a four stroke engine, which runs at half the speed of the crankshaft.

==== Ducted fans ====
Ducted fans are multi-blade propellers encased in a cylindrical duct or tube that may look like and fit in the same space as jet engine. They are available for both electric and liquid-fuelled engines, although they have become common with recent improvements in electric-flight technology. A model aircraft can now be fitted with four electric ducted fans for less than the cost of a single jet turbine, enabling affordable modelling of multi-engine airplanes. Compared to an unducted propeller, a ducted fan generates more thrust for the same area and speeds of up to 200 mph (320 km/h) have been recorded with electric-powered ducted fan airplanes, largely due to the higher RPMs possible with ducted fan propellers. Ducted fans are popular with scale models of jet aircraft, where they mimic the appearance of jet engines but they are also found on non-scale and sport models, and even lightweight 3D-flyers.

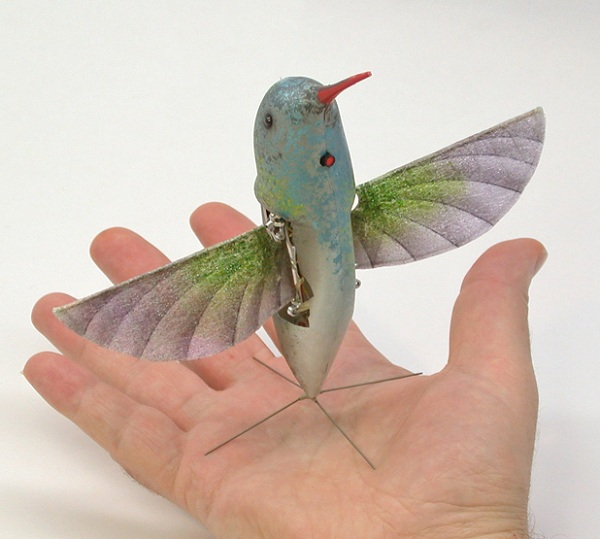
Small ornithopter, made to resemble a hummingbird

==== Other ====
With ornithopters the motion of the wing structure imitates the flapping-wings of living birds, producing both thrust and lift.

== Competitions and classes ==
World competitions are organized by the Fédération Aéronautique Internationale (FAI) in many classes, groups, and subclasses:

- Class F – model aircraft
  - F1x – Free Flight
  - F2x – Control Line
  - F3x – Radio Control
  - F4x – Scale Aircraft (a reduced-size reproduction of a full-size aircraft)
  - F5x – Radio Control Electric Powered Motor Gliders
  - FAI – Drone Racing (F3U)
- Class S – space model
- Class U – unmanned aerial vehicle

=== Free flight (F1) ===
The Wakefield Gold Challenge Cup is an international modelling competition named for the donor, Lord Wakefield. The event was first held on 5 July 1911 at The Crystal Palace in England. There were contests in 1912, 1913 and 1914. No contests were held again until 1927, when the Society of Model Aeronautical Engineers (SMAE) approached Lord Wakefield for a new larger silver trophy for international competition. This trophy is the present Wakefield International Cup and was first awarded in 1928. The SMAE organized the international competitions until 1951 when the FAI took over, and has since been made the award for the rubber-power category at the FAI World Free Flight Championships. The FAI free flight classes include:

- F1A – Gliders
- F1B – Model Aircraft with extensible (rubber band) motors – Wakefield Trophy
- F1C – Power model aircraft (combustion powered 2.5 cc (0.15 cu in))
- F1D – Indoor model aircraft
- F1E – Gliders with automatic steering
- F1N – Indoor hand-launch gliders
- F1P – Power model aircraft (combustion powered 1.0cc)
- F1Q – Electric power model aircraft
- F1G – Model aircraft with extensible (rubber band) motors « Coupe d’hiver » (provisional)
- F1H – Gliders (provisional)
- F1J – Power model aircraft (provisional) (combustion powered 1.0 cc (0.061 cu in))
- F1K – Model aircraft with CO_{2} motors (provisional)
- F1L – Indoor zone EZB model aircraft (provisional)
- F1M – Indoor model aircraft (provisional)
- F1R – Indoor model aircraft “Micro 35” (provisional)
- F1S – Small electric power model aircraft “E36”

=== Control line (F2) ===
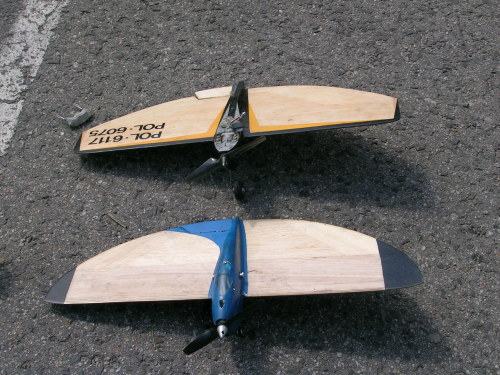
F2C class control line models

Also referred to as U-Control in the US, it was pioneered by the late Jim Walker who often, for show, flew three models at a time. Normally the model is flown in a circle and controlled by a pilot in the center holding a handle connected to two thin steel wires. The wires connect through the inboard wing tip of the plane to a mechanism that translates the handle movement to the aircraft elevator, allowing maneuvers to be performed along the aircraft pitch axis. The pilot turns to follow the model going round, the convention being counterclockwise for upright level flight.

For the conventional control-line system, tension in the lines is required to provide control. Line tension is maintained largely by centrifugal force. To increase line tension, models may be built or adjusted in various ways. Rudder offset and thrust vectoring (tilting the engine toward the outside) yaw the model outward. The position where the lines exit the wing can compensate for the tendency of the aerodynamic drag of the lines to yaw the model inboard. Weight on the outside wing, an inside wing that is longer or has more lift than the outside wing (or even no outside wing at all) and the torque of a left rotating propeller (or flying clockwise) tend to roll the model toward the outside. Wing tip weights, propeller torque, and thrust vectoring are more effective when the model is going slowly, while rudder offset and other aerodynamic effects have more influence on a fast moving model.

Since its introduction, control line flying has developed into a competition sport. There are contest categories for control line models, including Speed, Aerobatics (AKA Stunt), Racing, Navy Carrier, Balloon Bust, Scale, and Combat. There are variations on the basic events, including divisions by engine size and type, skill categories, and age of model design.

The events originated largely in the United States, and were later adapted for use internationally. The rules for US Competition are available from the Academy of Model Aeronautics. The international rules are defined by the Fédération Aéronautique Internationale (FAI). World Championships are held semiannually throughout the world, most recently in 2008 in France, with a limited slate of events – special varieties of Racing (F2C or "Team Race"), combat (F2D), and speed (F2A), all limited to engines displacing 0.15 cu. in (2.5cc), and Stunt (F2b), which is essentially unlimited with regard to design and size.

CIAM (FAI Aeromodelling Commission) designated the following classes in the F2 Control Line category:

F2A
CL Speed
F2B
CL Aerobatics
F2C
CL Team racing

The international class of racing is referred to as F2C (F2 = Control-line, C=racing) or Team Race. A pilot and a mechanic compete as a team to fly small 370 g (13 oz) 65 cm (26 in) wingspan semi-scale racing models over a tarmac or concrete surface. Lines are 15.92 m (52.2 ft) long.

Three pilots, plus mechanic teams, compete simultaneously in the same circle, and the object is to finish the determined course as fast as possible. Tank size is limited to 7 cc (0.43 cu in), requiring 2 or 3 refueling pitstops during the race.

The mechanic stands at a pit area outside the marked flight circle. The engine is started and the model released on the start signal. For refueling, the pilot operates a fuel shutoff by a quick down elevator movement after the planned number of laps so that the model can approach the mechanic at optimum speed, of around 31 mph (50 km/h). The mechanic catches the model by the wing, fill the tank from a pressurized can by a hose and finger valve, then restart the engine by flicking the propeller with his finger. A pitstop generally takes less than three seconds.

The course is 6.2 mi (10 km), with 100 laps. Flying speeds are around 200 km/h (120 mph), which means that the pilots turn one lap in roughly 1.8 seconds. Line pull due to centrifugal force is 19 lbf (85 N). An overtaking model is steered over the heads of the competing pilots of slower models.

After two rounds of elimination heats, the 6, 9 or 12 fastest teams enter two semifinal rounds, and the three fastest teams in the semifinals go to the final, which is run over the double course. Single cylinder two-stroke Diesel compression ignition engines designed for this purpose of up to 2.5 cc (0.15 cu in) are used. At the world championship level it is common for competitors design and build their own engines. Output power approaches 0.8 hp (0.60 kW) at 25,000 rpm.

==== F2D – control line combat ====
CLASS F2D - Control Line Combat Model Aircraft - Two pilots compete, with four mechanics in the pit. The aircraft are light and stubby so as to maneuver quickly in the air. Each has a 8 ft 2 in (2.5 m) crepe paper streamer attached to the rear of the aircraft by a 3 m (9.8 ft) string. Each pilot attacks only the other aircraft's streamer, to attempt to cut it with their propeller or wing. Each cut scores 100 points. Each second the model is in the air scores a point and the match runs for 4 minutes from the starter's signal. At the almost 120 mph (200 km/h) speeds of the aircraft, mistakes often lead to crash damage so two aircraft are permitted for each match. The mechanics are prepared for crashes and quickly start the second aircraft and transfer the streamer to the reserve model before launching. The action is so fast that an observer may miss the cuts of the streamers. A second loss eliminates a competitor, and the last pilot still flying wins.

=== Radio-controlled flight (F3) ===
The FAI radio control classes include:

F3A
RC Aerobatic Aircraft
F3B
RC Multi-Task Gliders
F3C
RC Aerobatic Helicopters
F3D
RC Pylon Racing Aeroplanes – Pylon racing refers to a class of air racing for radio controlled model aircraft that fly through a course of pylons. The sport is similar to the full-scale Red Bull Air Race World Series.
F3F
RC Slope Soaring Gliders
F3J
RC Thermal Duration Gliders
F3K
RC Hand Launch Gliders
F3M
RC Large Aerobatic Aircraft
F3N
RC Freestyle Aerobatic Helicopters
F3P
RC Indoor Aerobatic Aircraft
F3H
RC Soaring Cross Country Gliders
F3Q
RC Aero-Tow Gliders
F3R
RC Pylon Racing Limited Technology Aeroplanes
F3S
RC Jet Aerobatic Aircraft
F3T
RC Semi-Scale Pylon Racing with Controlled Technology Aeroplanes
F3U
RC Multi-rotor FPV Racing – The FAI Drone Racing World Cup is in the F3U class (Radio Control Multi-rotor FPV Racing). This is a highly competitive drone racing activity, involving mental exertion and big cash prizes.

=== Scale aircraft (F4) ===
The FAI classes for scale model aircraft (a reduced-size reproduction of a full-size aircraft) include:

F4B
control line scale aeroplanes
F4C
radio control scale aeroplanes
F4H
radio control stand-off scale aeroplanes

=== Radio-controlled electric motor gliders (F5) ===
The FAI classes include:

  - F5B – Electric Motor Glider – Multi Task (held in alternate years only)
  - F5D – Electric Pylon Racing
  - F5J – Electric Motor Glider – Thermal Duration

== Model aerodynamics ==
A contest-winning paper glider

The flight behavior of an aircraft depends on the scale to which it is built, the density of the air and the speed of flight.

At subsonic speeds the relationship between these is expressed by the Reynolds number. Where two models at different scales are flown with the same Reynolds number, the airflow is similar. Where the Reynolds numbers differ, as for example a small-scale model flying at lower speed than the full-size craft, the airflow characteristics can differ significantly. This can make an exact scale model unflyable, and the model has to be modified in some way. For example, at low Reynolds numbers, a flying scale model usually requires a larger-than-scale propeller.

Maneuverability depends on scale, with stability also becoming more important. Control torque is proportional to lever arm length while angular inertia is proportional to the square of the lever arm, so the smaller the scale the more quickly an aircraft or other vehicle turns in response to control inputs or outside forces.

One consequence of this is that models in general require additional longitudinal and directional stability, resisting sudden changes in pitch and yaw. While it may be possible for a pilot to respond quickly enough to control an unstable aircraft, a radio control scale model of the same aircraft would be flyable only with design adjustments such as increased tail surfaces and wing dihedral for stability, or with avionics providing artificial stability. Free flight models need to have both static and dynamic stability. Static stability is the resistance to sudden changes in pitch and yaw already described, and is typically provided by the horizontal and vertical tail surfaces respectively, and by a forward center of gravity. Dynamic stability is the ability to return to straight and level flight without any control input. The three dynamic instability modes are pitch (phugoid) oscillation, spiral and Dutch roll. An aircraft with too large a horizontal tail on a fuselage that is too short may have a phugoid instability with increasing climbs and dives. With free flight models, this usually results in a stall or loop at the end of the initial climb. Insufficient dihedral or sweep back generally leads to increasing spiral turn. Too much dihedral or sweepback generally causes Dutch roll. These all depend on the scale, as well as details of the shape and weight distribution. For example, the paper glider shown here is a contest winner when made of a small sheet of paper but goes from side to side in Dutch roll when scaled up even slightly.

== See also ==
- Control line also called U-Control
  - Round-the-pole flying
- Model engine
- Model building
  - Cox model engine
  - Thunder Tiger
  - O.S. Engines
- Die-cast toy
- Free flight (model aircraft)
- History of aviation
- International Miniature Aerobatic Club
- International Plastic Modellers' Society (IPMS)
- List of model aircraft manufacturers
- List of model airplane fields in the USA
- List of scale model kit manufacturers
- Micro air vehicle
- Model Airplane News
- Model airport
- Model ship
- Paper plane
- Radio-controlled aircraft
- Radio-controlled glider
- Radio-controlled helicopter
- Radio-controlled model
- Simple Plastic Airplane Design
- Walkalong glider
