= Tumblewing =

Type of rotating wing, glider or kite

== Tumbling Wing ==
Animation of a tumblewing in flight.

A tumblewing or "tumble wing" or "tumbling wing" is a glider or kite wing design which rotates about an axis transverse to the apparent wind, not necessarily horizontal. Tumble wings are frequently employed in wind turbines (such as the Savonius design), and are also used in some types of confetti.

Tumble wings may be made of any material that supports some stiffness for form, such as paper, plastic, metal, composites or wood. Many leaves falling from trees become tumble wing gliders.

=== Aerodynamics ===
Tumbling wings generate lift by alternately flying and stalling as the angle of incidence changes with the spinning motion (see magnus effect and flettner rotor). Its mode of flight is more akin to confetti than traditional fixed-wing aircraft; however, several model aircraft, such as flettner airplanes, have been built with tumbling wings for lift. Tumble wings are employed as the wing of kite systems, a type of rotary kite, and many such patents exist.

=== Paper plane ===
The paper plane called the tumbling wing is designed by John Collins also referred to as the "Paper Airplane Guy". The plane is flown by using a piece of cardboard to create a draft which in turn speeds the plane increasing the spinning motion to create lift. Because it does not need ballast, the tumblewing design has a lower wing loading and makes a good walkalong glider which is easy to make and fly.

== See also ==
- Controllable slope soaring – Type of slope soaring where a slope is made to follow a walkalong glider
- Gliding – Recreational activity and competitive air sport
- History of human-powered aircraft
- Orographic lift – Air mass forced upwards as it moves over rising terrain
- Ridge lift – Wind deflected upwards by an obstacle
