= Windrider (glider) =

The Windrider walkalong glider is a commercially available toy airplane designed to be flown by controllable slope soaring. The design was first invented, manufactured and sold by Tyler MacCready, son of Paul MacCready. The same design appeared as the Air Surfer from WowWee for a brief period before being produced by the current manufacturer, Windrider Ltd. of Hong Kong. The Windrider is a flying wing design type of fixed-wing aircraft.

== See also ==
- Gliding
- Orographic lift
- Slope soaring
- controllable slope soaring
- Human-powered aircraft
