= Radio-controlled glider =

Type of radio-controlled aircraft

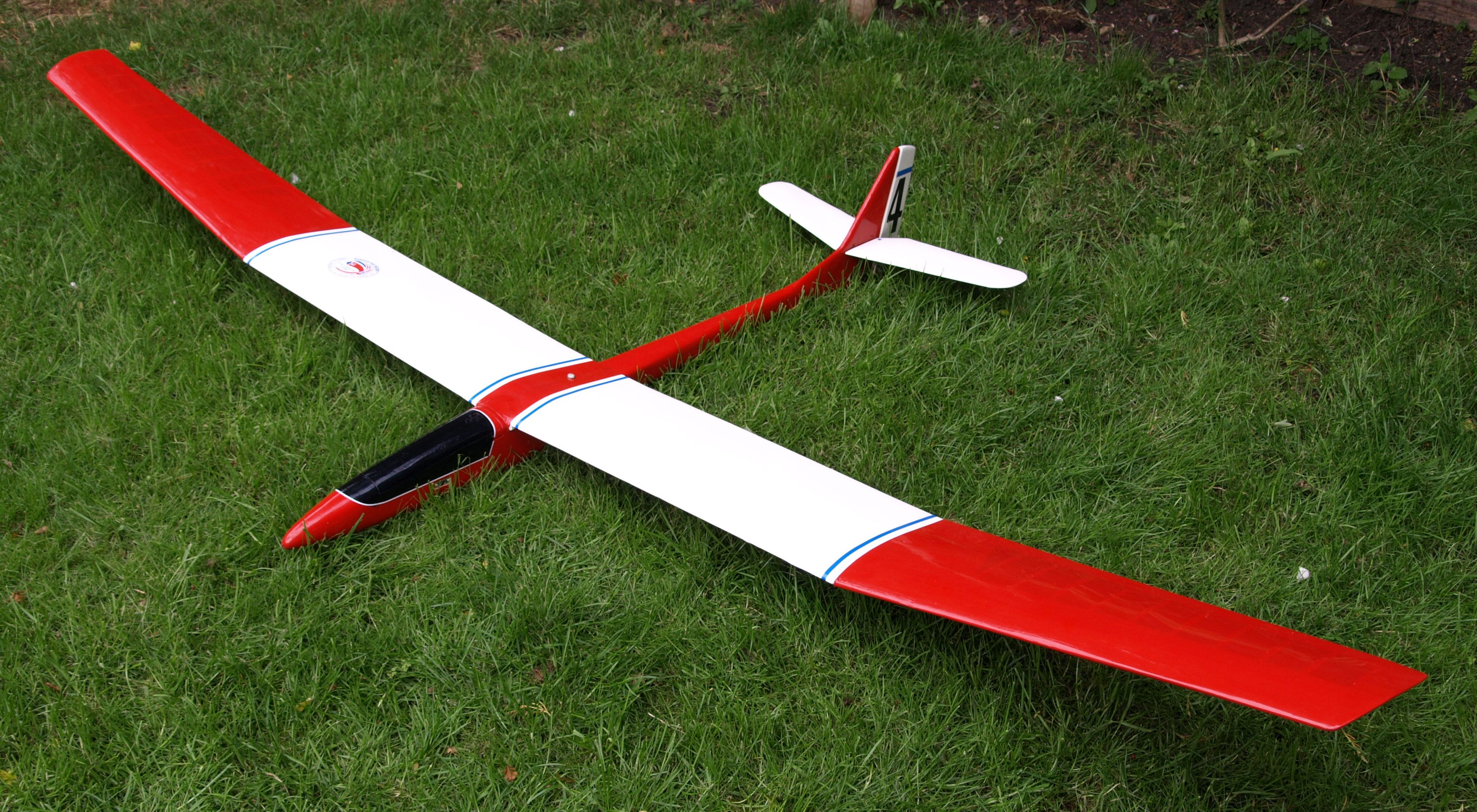
A traditionally built '100S' class thermal soaring glider

A radio-controlled glider is a type of radio-controlled aircraft that normally does not have any form of propulsion. They are able to sustain continuous flight by exploiting the lift produced by slopes and thermals, controlled remotely from the ground with a transmitter. They can be constructed from a variety of materials, including wood, plastic, polymer foams, and composites, and can vary in wing loading from very light to relatively heavy, depending on their intended use.

International radio-controlled glider competitions are regulated by the Fédération Aéronautique Internationale (FAI) although many countries have their own national classes.

== Launching methods ==
=== Hand launch ===
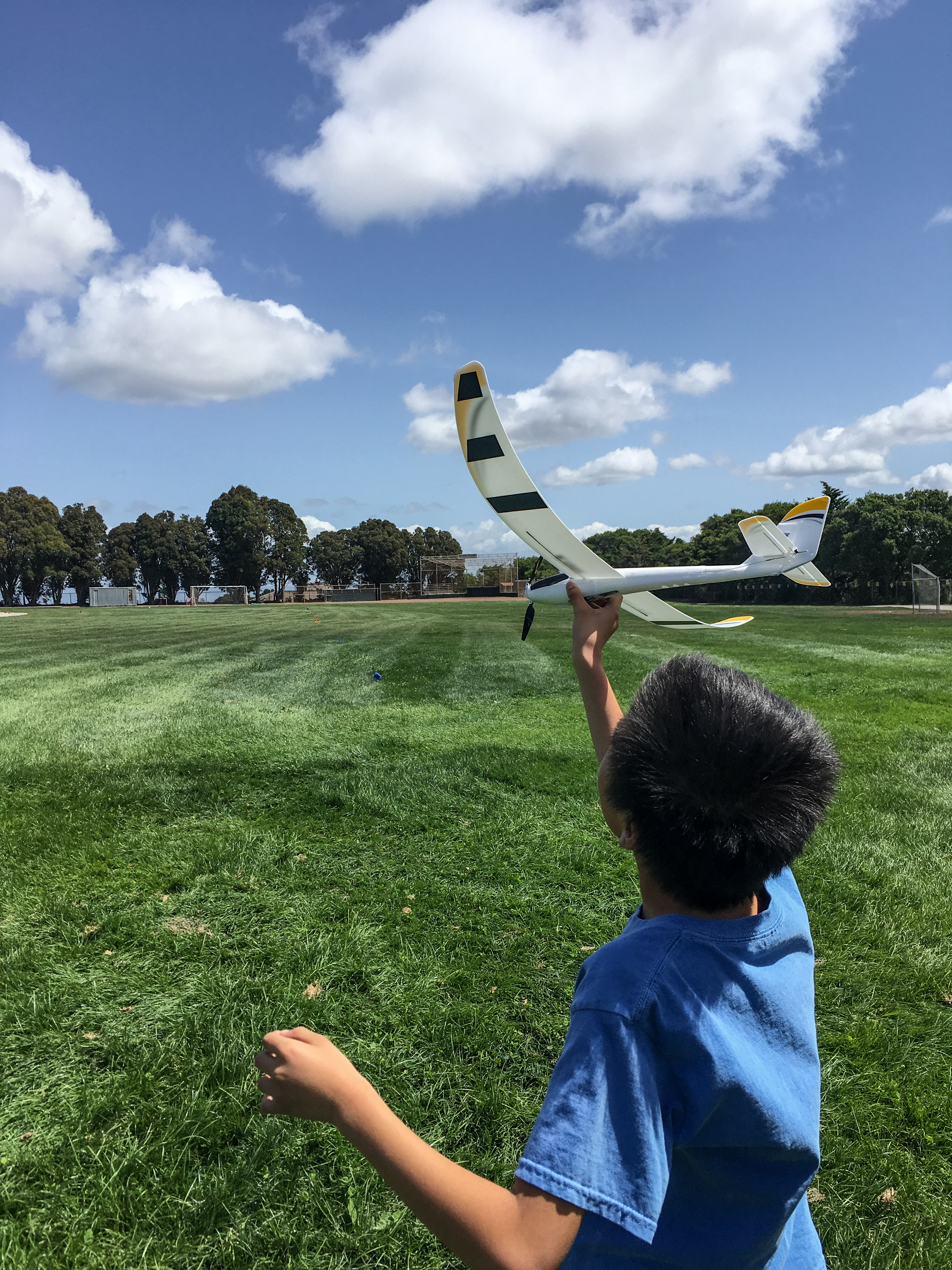
Hand-launching an UMX Radian

Hand launching is the simplest way to get a model glider into the air. Depending on craft design and the conditions at launch—the pilot or an assistant need only to gently 'throw' it into the wind, at an angle deemed best suited, usually between horizontal and 45 degrees of zenith. In this manner a successful launch is possible with very little effort. This method is usually utilised when slope soaring, where with a little experience, it is possible to simply hold the craft above the head at the correct angle and let go.

=== Towline launch ===
In this method another person runs along the ground pulling a 50-to-150-metre (160 to 490 ft) line with the glider attached to the end, while the pilot steers it. It can be performed on any flat piece of terrain, as the glider is given sufficient altitude during the launch.

A variation of this method uses a pulley with the line staked to the ground and the line passing around it before going to the glider. The tow man runs with the pulley (still running away from the pilot) which doubles his effective speed. A variation of this is used in F3J competition when two tow men run with the pulley to generate much faster launches (although the models have to be sufficiently strong to handle the loads placed upon them by this method) which allows the model to use the energy to "zoom" (the model is pointed downwards briefly to convert the stored energy in the stretched monofilament line into airspeed, and once the airspeed exceeds the towline speed the line is released, before being rotated into a nose high attitude and the speed being converted back into additional height).

=== Bungee/Hi-start launch ===
This launch is a variant of the towline launch performed alone. The running person is replaced by a combined length of elastic cord or rubber tubing and line which is attached to the ground upwind of the pilot, often using a 'corkscrew' dog stake. Variations in rubber diameter, model weight and headwind determine the launch height.

=== 'Piggyback' launch ===
A second, powered radio-controlled aircraft lifts the model glider into the air, attached to a special cradle which is, in turn, mounted to either the top or the bottom of the carrier aircraft. Although this method is spectacular, it requires an experienced pilot to steer the carrier aircraft as the addition of the glider can significantly affect the handling of their model. Special care must be also taken by the pilots of both models to avoid a collision after the release of the glider.

=== Discus launch ===
This method of launching can be performed only on a special type of glider - a Discus Launch Glider (DLG). To launch the model into the air, the pilot holds the model by the tip of a wing, spins 360°, rotating the model around their body and then releases hold of the model allowing it to launch at high speed and climb to height. Although DLGs are a fairly new type of model glider, they are gaining popularity due to their ease of launching and efficient flight characteristics. DLG models are used in the F3K contest class, as defined by the FAI.

=== Aerotow launch ===
As full-size aerotowing using a radio-controlled tug, often used for launching larger scale gliders.

=== Winch launch ===
As full-size winch launching but using a small electric motor (usually based on a car starter motor) and a reverse pulley staked to the ground upwind. The launch speed is controlled by the pilot using a foot pedal. A parachute is used (pulled shut by the launch tension) to assist in preventing the winch spool overrunning when the model is released.

Variations have included multiple batteries and motors but regulations were put in place in the late 1980s by the FAI to limit the winch power used in FAI class competitions.

== Forms of flight ==
=== Slope soaring ===
Slope soaring refers to unpowered aircraft sustaining flight on the lift produced by wind blowing up the face of a steep slope on hills, mountains, and cliffs. See the Ridge Lift page for more information on the lift mechanism of "frontside" flying. Dynamic soaring, utilizing the leeward or "backside" of a hill, has recently become very popular.

==== Disciplines ====
===== F3F =====
Another form of slope R/C glider racing is called F3F. The F3F is one of many competition categories for model and full scale aircraft that are defined by the Fédération Aéronautique Internationale (FAI). In F3F racing, the pilot is timed on the course for 10 legs of 100 metres (330 ft) for a total distance of 1 kilometre (0.62 mi). All pilots fly a timed run for each round. The fastest pilot receives 1,000 points for the round and all others are given a percentage which is determined by the ratio of their time to the fast time for the round. At the end of the competition, the pilot with the most points wins.

===== Combat =====
Combat is usually flown with expanded polypropylene (EPP) foam models due to their impact resistance. Each pilot tries to knock the other's aircraft physically out of the air. A "kill" is scored only when the opponents aircraft hits the ground. If a hit occurs and each aircraft recovers and remains airborne, the hits generally do not count. Often this activity includes extreme maneuvers and aerobatics.

This particular class of slope glider is popular, as novices can learn to fly with a less fragile and cheaper model that can work as a stand-off scale model. Particularly popular combat gliders are World War II fighters, e.g. the Spitfire/Seafire, P-51 Mustang and P-47 Thunderbolt.

===== Ridge racing =====
Ridge racing (or pylon racing where markers are present) is essentially using the slope lift to race along the "lift zone"—generally parallel to the slope. This can be MoM (man-on-man) racing, in which 2 to 4 gliders compete against each other on the same course. Scoring is similar to match racing in the sport of sailing - the first pilot to complete the course receives one point, the second two points and so on. At the end of the competition, the pilot with the fewest points wins.

===== PSS =====
PSS, or Power Scale Soaring, is all about building and flying scale model gliders of full-sized jet-, rocket- or piston-powered aircraft. World War II prop planes such as the P-51, Supermarine Spitfire and Bf 109 are common subjects for PSS planes, however PSS aircraft produced to date have ranged from the early biplanes through to modern jet fighters and even commercial airliners.

The challenge with Power Scale Soaring is to build a model as close to scale as possible whilst at the same time ensuring the model has good flying characteristics.

Model EPP jet fighter slope soarers have become extremely popular, usually either 1950s and some 1960s designs e.g. the MiG-15, the P-80 Shooting Star, and the F-86 Sabre, and the Northrop F-5 and F-20. More ambitious modellers are experimenting with more recent jet fighters such as the F-16, F-15, MiG-29 and Su-27.

===== Dynamic soaring =====
Dynamic soaring is a relatively new style of flying model gliders whereby the windshear just downwind of certain slopes can be used to create high speeds. It involves gaining altitude, then soaring into a patch of dead air, then back to the lift to gain speed.

===== Slope Aerobatics =====
Slope aerobatics involves flying aerobatic figures and sequences on the slope with gliders that have been optimized for aerobatic flight. These gliders typically using airfoils that allow identical upright and inverted performance, as well as unique fuselage shapes that permit some amount of sustained knife edge flight. Most gliders feature three axes of control (aileron, elevator, and rudder), and often use flaperons to extend the capabilities of the airfoils for maximum aerobatic performance. Some of the most advanced slope aerobatics gliders feature all-moving elevators and rudders capable of 180* rotation, allowing them to perform "flips" around the pitch or yaw axis, respectively. Airframes are constructed of any material, with wood, fiberglass and/or carbon fiber being preferred for gliders intended for precision aerobatics, and EPP (expanded polypropylene) being popular for low altitude aerobatics where interactions with the ground - like wingtip and/or inverted fin drags, or touch-and-goes off of obstacles - are commonly performed and desired.

=== Thermal soaring ===
Thermal soaring uses columns of warm, rising air called thermals to provide lift for a glider. Thermal soaring gliders are normally launched with a bungee cord catapult, a winch or towed by a powered model aircraft. A discus launch glider (DLG) is simply launched into the air with a spinning motion much like a discus throw.

Thermal soaring is often combined with slope soaring. Thermals from elsewhere can drift in over the hill to combine with the hill lift or they can be formed by the hill itself, if the slope is angled to the sun causing the slope to heat up faster than in the surrounding areas. The resulting warm air will then flow upwards pulling in air from the valley below, causing a wind up the slope. The lift is thus a combination of ridge lift and thermal. This has produced a new term, "slermal", to describe the mixture of both slope lift and thermal activity coming up the hill face.

==== F3J ====
F3J is one of many competition categories for model and full scale aircraft that are defined by the Fédération Aéronautique Internationale (FAI). F3J is a man on man thermal soaring competition undertaken on a flat field site (ideally 1–2 miles from workable slope lift). Models are launched by a monofilament tow line, pulled by two towers who run with the line or a pulley. The method is similar to winch launching without any electrical equipment required. A group typically of from 6 to 10 pilots try to fly for as long as possible within a 10-minute period of time (known as a slot). Within the slot time they have to launch the glider, fly for as long as possible and land as close as they can to a predetermined spot, without overflying the end of the slot time. If the nose of the model comes to rest on the centre of the landing spot then 100 landing points are scored. Landing points are reduced by 1 point every 20 cm from the center of the landing circle. A combination of the flying time (as a percentage of the longest flight within the slot) and precision landing makes up scoring. A maximum of 1000 points is awarded to the winner of each group. Overflying the slot time results in a penalty and the withdrawal of any landing points bonus.

The models have evolved into predominantly all composite gliders of 3.4–4 m wingspan with full span flaps and ailerons, sufficiently strong to take a two-man tow in a wind of up to 20 mph. Advances in composite construction have reduced the flying weights of these models to less than 2 kg. Ballast weight is added to increase the flying speed during windy weather.

The individual winner of the competition is determined by a fly-off in which the top 10−12 competitors fly after the preliminary rounds. The fly-off task is 15 minutes, making the soaring task more difficult. Typical winning scores at a World Championships are 14:58 minutes of flight times and 98-100 landing points. The top places are separated by the smallest margins, often less than 5 points separate the winner from 5th place.

==== F3B ====
F3B is the original sailplane competition category defined by the Fédération Aéronautique Internationale (FAI). Originally called "Thermal Soaring" it is now called "Multitask Soaring." F3B is a flat field, thermal soaring category where the glider is launched with the help of an electric winch. There are three tasks to perform. Thermal duration, where the goal is to keep flying for 10 minutes and land on the spot; distance, flying the maximum number of laps in four minutes; and speed, flying the minimum time to cover four laps of 150 metres (490 ft) each. The three tasks have to be flown with the same plane, changing only weight between tasks. Duration is flown at the minimum weight, typically around 2 kg. Speed is flown up to the maximum of 5 kg but typically around 3–4 kg depending on the wind and lift. Distance can be flown at a wide variety of weights, depending on the thermal conditions available, with heavier weights to fly faster and lighter ones to fly slower.

F3B models are called multitask gliders, similar to F3F slope gliders with a lighter composite layup. The design of the F3B model is especially challenging because of the wide range of operating conditions. It must be flown very slowly to achieve the duration time and create high lift to maximize launch altitude off the winch. At the same time it must have very low drag to fly at high speed during the distance and speed tasks. The launch and turning loads require very strong airframes, composite construction has been in use since the first world championship in 1977. Models are typically constructed from carbon fiber, utilizing more exotic high modulus carbon in the wing spars. The empty weight of the airframes have come down substantially since the early 1990s when competitive aircraft weighed 3 kg empty. Many top designs are commercially available from manufacturers such as TUDM, Baudis Model and Samba Model in Europe.

==== F3K ====
F3K is the competition category for discus launched models where the competition is divided in different tasks and combined tasks in a way that the pilot may launch several times within a task, for example adding consecutive flying times as long as the time of the last flight is longer than the previous one. F3K models are among the lightest radio controlled gliders. Typical flying weights are less than 9 ounces, with full trailing edge and tail controls.

Construction is typically very light weight carbon fiber, fiberglass and kevlar. Advances in composites and micro radio equipment have enabled these gliders to increase performance dramatically over their historical javelin style hand launched siblings. Weight is kept to a minimum in all parts of the model. Common practices include removing the plastic cases from the radio receivers, using the smallest batteries practical, and flying the models without any paint.

Modern aerodynamic design practices have also been applied to reduce the drag and improve the handling characteristics of these gliders. Design tools such as Xfoil, created by Prof Mark Drela at MIT, have been applied to the design of these aircraft, creating much better understanding of low speed aerodynamics and inspiring new design practices, such as thin airfoils. In some cases, the minimum thickness of the wing is limited only by the thickness of the servos that must fit within that wing to control the flaps.

== Types ==
Two foam wings

=== Flying wings ===
The flying wing design is particularly popular for slope combat in which pilots try to knock other gliders out of the air. A "kill" is only scored when one plane is grounded and the other flies away, regardless of which plane initiated the hit. Expanded polypropylene foam (EPP) foam has become very popular in the construction of these gliders, primarily due to their damage resistance and low cost. The most common wing span is 4 feet (1.2 meters). Well-built gliders will typically survive head-on collisions with combined speeds exceeding 50 mph (80 km/h) with little to no damage to either plane.

=== Scale gliders ===
Scale gliders are models of full-size gliders. Scale gliders are generally larger models (2 m wingspan or greater) and made from composite materials. Scale Gliders are sometimes modified slightly to obtain the best flying characteristics, such as less drag and more aerobatic potential. This is achieved by changing the size of the control surfaces or the wing airfoil. Some scale gliders are very close in appearance to their full scale counterparts, and this makes them a beautiful sight at any flying field. A model often "scaled" because of its clean looks and great aerobatic potential is the MDM-1 Fox. The ASW series (mostly ASW-26 and ASW-28) are also popular scale gliders.

=== Powered gliders ===
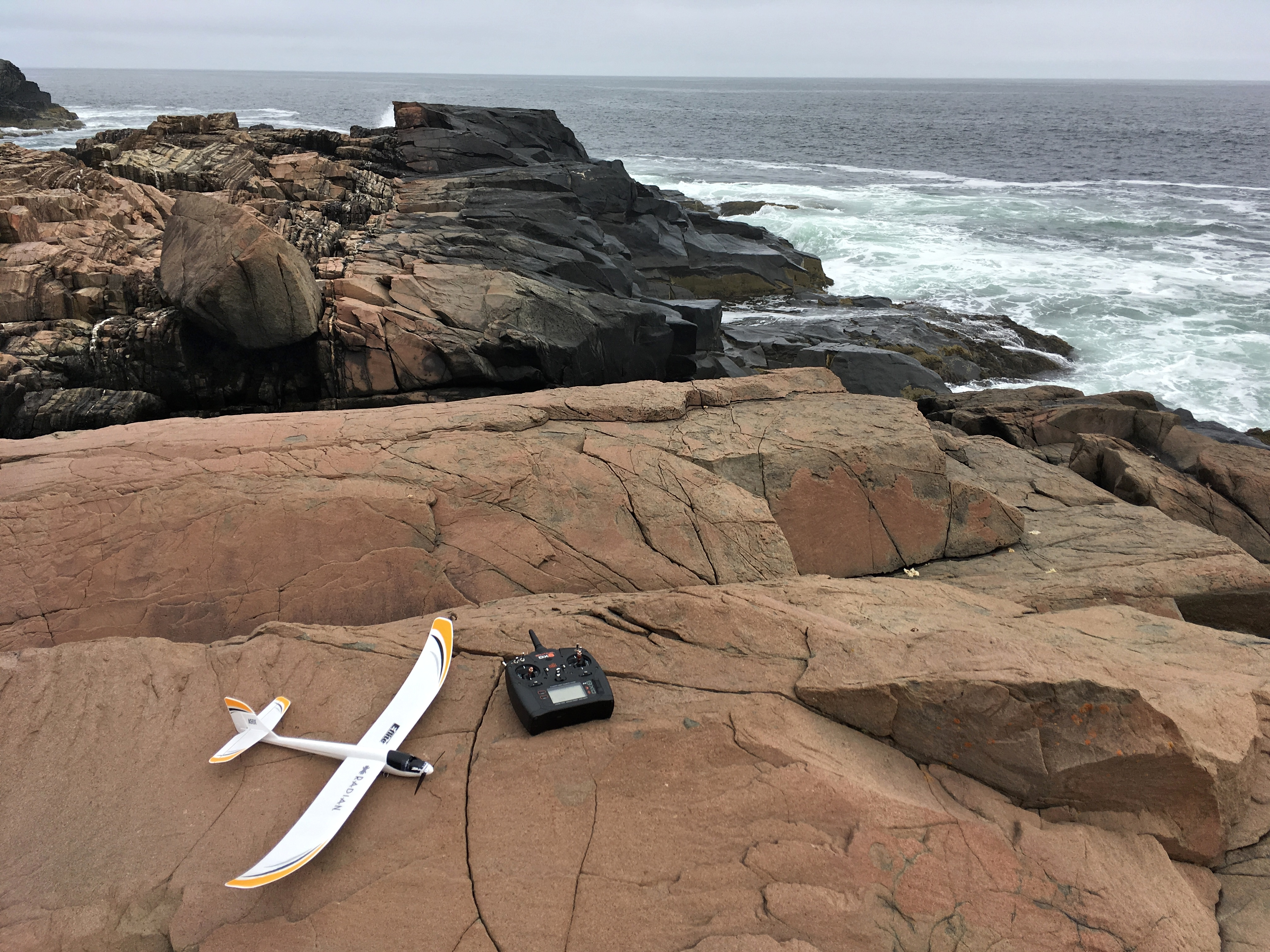
UMX Radian on a rock formation at Bald Head Cliff

Powered gliders use electric motors, internal combustion engines or even jet engines to provide propulsion for a glider to get in the air. The power systems are normally only used for short periods to launch thermal soarers, motor runs of 30 seconds are typical with timer or height limiting onboard electronics cutting power automatically during competitions.

Electric gliders use propellers which fold inwards when the power source is cut off during flight. This provides the glider with lower air resistance and reduces overall drag which would be present if the propeller was to remain in its open or natural state.

== Competition classes ==
=== International ===
International radio-controlled glider competitions are regulated by the Fédération Aéronautique Internationale (FAI). The classes are:

- F3B

Multi-task soaring, model limitations defined by FAI rules. Three separate tasks are flown, they are duration, speed and distance (number of laps) over a closed course.

- F3F

Slope speed (pylon racing), model limitations defined by FAI rules

- F3H

Cross country soaring racing.

- F3J

Thermal soaring duration, no model limitations. 150-metre (490 ft) towline maximum length. Pilots fly against each other in a 10-minute time "slot" followed by a precision landing, distance to a set landing point is measured with a graduated tape, bonus points for landing accuracy are added to the flight time.

- F3K

Handlaunched glider

- F5B

Electric soaring speed (similar to F3B Speed/Distance tasks), wing loading, launch height and maximum battery weight limitations apply.

- F5J

Electric-Launch Thermal Duration Soaring. Electric launch, altitude limited thermal duration similar to F3J. 30 second Launch Window, 0.5 point per meter penalty for each meter of launch altitude at window end up to 200m, 3 point per meter penalty for each meter above 200m.

=== United Kingdom ===
British national radio-controlled glider classes are:

- Mini-glider - Maximum wingspan 60 inches (150 cm), maximum weight 22 ounces (0.62 kg).
- Two metre - Maximum wingspan 2 metres (6.6 ft), 150-metre (490 ft) towline maximum length.
- 100S or Standard Class Maximum wingspan 100 inches (250 cm) (thermal soaring). 150-metre (490 ft) towline maximum length.
- BARCS Open Class - No model limitations, 150-metre (490 ft) towline only.
- Sixty inch slope - Pylon racing, maximum wingspan 60 inches (150 cm)
- Slope cross country - No model limitations, pilot walks around a course while controlling the model.
- PSS and Scale - The model must be a recognisable replica of a full-size powered aircraft or glider.
- Slope aerobatics - No model limitations.
- E-slot - Maximum seven-cell battery pack
- Electroslot E400 Motor must be standard "Speed 400" type.

== See also ==
- Controllable slope soaring
- Gliding
- Radio-controlled model
