= Walkalong glider =

Type of model aircraft

Person flying a Walkalong glider.

A walkalong glider is a lightweight, slow-flying model aircraft designed to be kept aloft by controllable slope soaring in the rising air generated by the pilot who walks along with the glider as it flies, usually holding a paddle. Hands or even the forehead can also be used to create an updraft. This type of soaring differs from other types of slope soaring in that the orographic lift (or "hill") is following the plane as it flies in the air and thus no other wind is required.

Types of walkalong gliders have been patented. Some walkalong glider designs have been named, such as the air surfer, the windrider, the tumblewing and the follow foil.

Walkalong gliding has also been referred to as controllable slope soaring but should not be confused with dynamic soaring.

Ground effect should not be confused with ridge lift when explaining how walkalong gliders stay up. Ground effect involves a horizontal surface. Ridge lift requires a sloping surface. In ground effect the air does not have to move relative to the ground whereas ridge lift requires the wind to be blowing horizontally against the ridge. Walkalong gliders are sustained and controlled in the ridge lift produced by the moving paddle.

== History ==
The first description of a walkalong glider appears in the 1955 patent of J. E. Grant. The first flight of a functional walkalong glider appears briefly in the Academy Award winning documentary The Flight of the Gossamer Condor.

== Walkalong glider design ==
A walkalong glider must fly at or below walking speed. Light weight materials and specific design will reduce a walkalong glider's flying speed. For example, using a lower paper density will reduce a paper walkalong glider's wing loading and thus its air speed. Walkalong glider designs have differing wing loadings, for example, the tumblewing type designs will have lower wing loading than traditional nose weighted paper airplane designs made from the same paper density. For nose weighted walkalong glider designs, the wings should include a twist or washout to improve roll control close to stall speed. Although many walkalong gliders are flying wing designs (as are almost all flying and gliding animals) walkalong glider designs based on traditional fixed-wing aircraft (incorporating an empennage or tail) have been made from balsa wood sticks and tissue paper.

The paddle should be made from a sheet of lightweight but rigid material such as corrugated cardboard or foamcore. The larger the area of the sheet the stronger the updraft created at the top edge. A 1-meter square area paddle is large enough to fly most walkalong gliders.

== See also ==
- Gliding
- Orographic lift
- Slope soaring
- Сontrollable slope soaring
- Human-powered aircraft
