= Static lift =

Static lift may refer to:

For an aerostat:

- Buoyancy, the lifting force of the gas

For an aerodyne:

- Lift (force), the lifting force generated by the wings
- Lift (soaring), rising air used by soaring birds and gliders

== See also ==
- Dynamic soaring, a flying technique used to gain energy by repeatedly crossing the boundary between air masses of significantly different velocity
