= List of model airplane fields =

Model airplane fields are used for landings and takeoffs of model aircraft.

Facilities provided vary significantly. They range from unimproved fields to paved runways.

Most model airfields in the United States have clubs chartered with the Academy of Model Aeronautics, similarly in Canada, their equivalent organization, the Model Aeronautics Association of Canada, provides the same function.

Notable fields
Name	Location	Size	Runways	Facilities	Website	Ref
The Bill Osborne Model Airplane Flying Field	Alameda, California		35 by 45 feet (11 by 14 m); 2-paved donuts	Opened 1947 work benches	http://www.aeromaniacs.com/Aeronuts.html	
Model Airplane Field at Edwin Warner Park	Nashville, Tennessee					
Breuner Airfield	Richmond, California	5 acres (2.0 ha)	300 feet (91 m)			
Santa Clara County Model Aircraft Skypark	Morgan Hill, California	40 acres (16 ha)	520 by 60 feet (158 by 18 m) paved		SCCMAS	
Whittier Narrows Model Aircraft Field (12 Miles East of downtown Los Angeles)	El Monte, California		Yes	Two CL (Control-Line) Stunt Circles, paved One Caged CL Speed Circle, paved (Pulse Jets and the like); One CL Navy Carrier Circle, grass with Concrete Carrier Deck; One oversize CL Combat field, grass Paved R/C runway	KOTRC	
El Dorado East Regional Park Model Flying Field	Long Beach, California				http://www.longbeach.gov/globalassets/park/media-library/documents/park-and-facilities/parks-and-facilities-directory/el-dorado-east-regional-park/updated-glider-field-rules	
