= Discus Launch Glider =

A Discus Launch Glider (DLG), sometimes also called Side Arm Launch (SAL) glider, is a radio controlled model sailplane launched using a 'discus launch' in which the glider is held by a wingtip and the flier rotates rapidly before release. Using this launching method, the average flier can achieve launch heights of greater than 100 feet (30 m), with contest competitors more than doubling that height and record throws approaching the 300-foot (91 m) mark.

The discus method of hand launching has become more popular than the older 'javelin style' launch, where a model glider would be launched over-arm, like a javelin. The discus launch is easier, more efficient and less physically demanding than the javelin launch. After launch, fliers search for lift in the form of thermals or other rising air currents to increase the duration of their flights. Besides launch height or duration, competitions may also include tests of glider flying skill, precision landing, and timing.

Although some DLG designs utilise a traditional built-up construction using balsa wood and covering film, most DLG models are generally now constructed from composite materials, in the form of Kevlar, carbon fibre and glass fibre. Fuselages are moulded in Kevlar/carbon and epoxy, with wings either moulded as a hollow composite shell, or vacuum bagged over a wire-cut or CNC-formed foam core.

Most DLG models use aileron, rudder and elevator control, with the ailerons serving as camber changing flaps for different modes of flight and also as airbrakes for landing. Modern DLG models have sophisticated aerodynamics and are very light. Usually a 1.5 m DLG model weighs approximately 240-290 grams (8.5 - 10.2 ounces), while smaller 1 m DLG models weight around 110-150 grams (3.9 - 5.3 ounces). Many pilots use programmable radio transmitters with full mixing and flight mode capabilities in order to optimise performance and set up the models for flight as near perfectly as possible.

DLG models are used for both general fun/sport flying and contest flying.

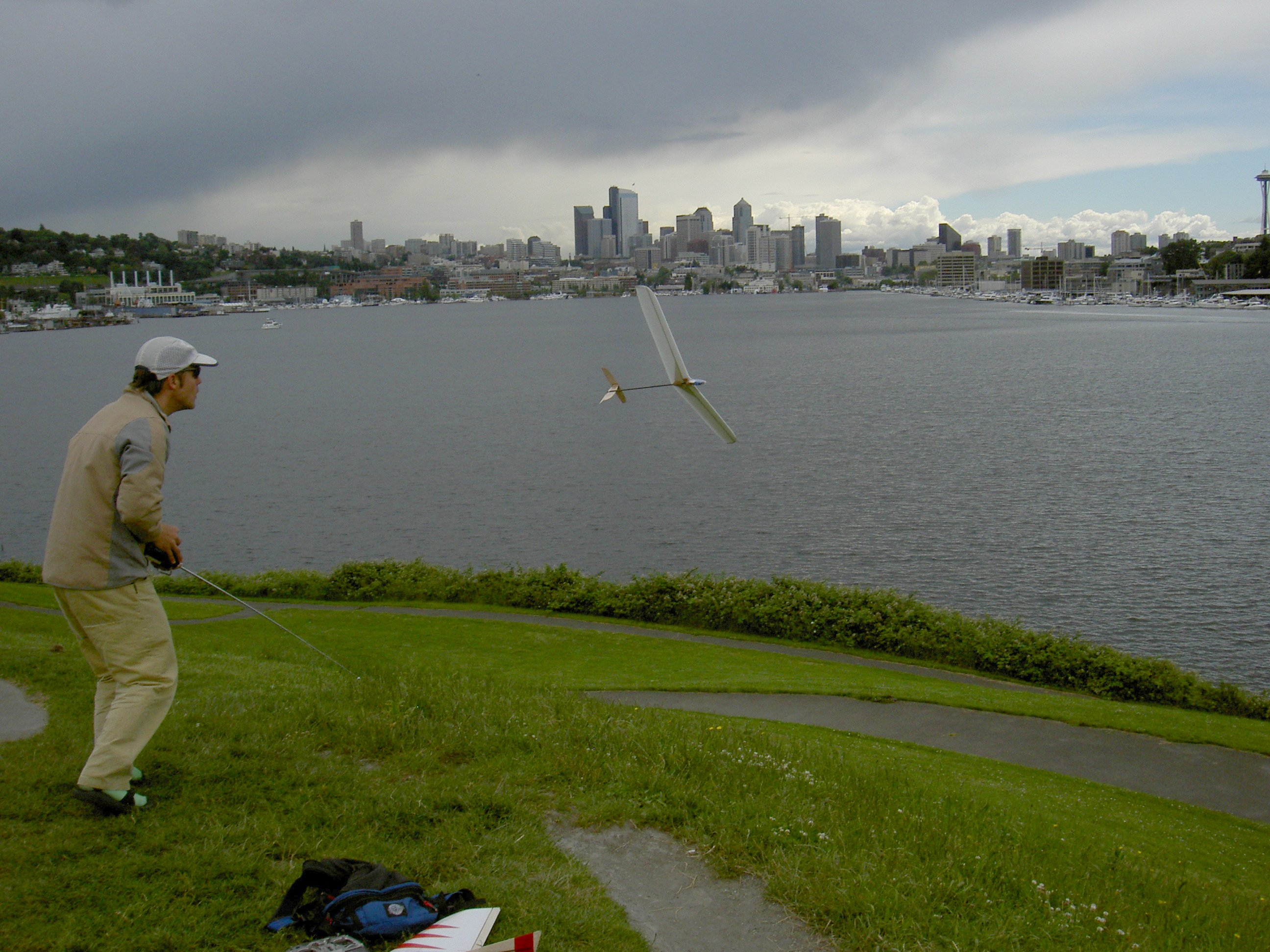

== F3K ==
F3K is the international contest class for radio controlled, hand-launched model gliders.

Although the roots of RC hand-launched gliders can be traced back to the late 1970s, F3K is a relatively new aeromodelling discipline, becoming officially recognised by the FAI (international body responsible for aeromodelling competition disciplines) in 2007.

F3K gliders are limited to a 1.5 metre wingspan. F3K competitions consist of a group of fliers completing a number of pre-defined flight tasks involving launching, flying and landing the model in a number of timed durations. Just the hand launch and thermal currents of rising air (thermals) are used to sustain the flight. Since thermals cannot be seen, F3K pilots rely on ground signs such as surface wind velocity, temperature and direction; signs such as circling birds, bugs, or rising particulates; and changes of direction or attitude of the glider due to the thermal itself. The pilot uses these signs to resolve the approximate location of the thermal. For F3K tasks where longer durations are needed, positioning and maintaining the model glider in thermal rising air is paramount. Contest strategy includes determining the location of thermals before the pilot launches. Discus launched gliders can be made from a combination of foam, balsa, carbon fiber, kevlar, and other materials. Prices of these models range from $100 to $900 plus.

== See also ==
- Model aircraft
- Radio-controlled aircraft
