= Dynamic soaring =

Flying technique

Dynamic soaring is a flying technique used to gain energy by repeatedly crossing the boundary between air masses of different velocity. Such zones of wind gradient are generally found close to obstacles and close to the surface, so the technique is mainly of use to birds and operators of radio-controlled gliders, but glider pilots are sometimes able to soar dynamically in meteorological wind shears at higher altitudes.

Dynamic soaring is sometimes confused with slope soaring which is a technique for achieving elevation.

== Basic mechanism ==
While different flight patterns can be employed in dynamic soaring, the simplest is a closed loop across the shear layer between two airmasses in relative movement, e.g. stationary air in a valley, and a layer of wind above the valley. The gain in speed can be explained in terms of airspeed and groundspeed:

- As the glider begins the loop, say in a stationary airmass, groundspeed and airspeed are the same.
- The glider enters the moving airmass nearly head-on, which increases the glider's airspeed.
- The glider then turns 180°, where it is able to maintain most of its airspeed due to momentum. This must happen immediately, or groundspeed will be lost. The glider's groundspeed, first crosswind, then downwind, as it turns, is now higher, as the tailwind has accelerated the glider.
- The loop continues with the glider re-entering the stationary airmass and turning around, maintaining the now higher airspeed and groundspeed.
- Each cycle results in higher speeds, up to a point where drag prevents additional increase.

The energy is extracted by using the velocity difference between the two airmasses to lift the flying object to a higher altitude (or to reverse the descent respectively) after the transfer between the airmasses.

Dynamic Soaring Loop

In practice, there is a turbulent mixing layer between the moving and stationary air mass. In addition, drag forces are continually slowing the plane. Since higher speed gives rise to higher drag forces, there is a maximum speed that can be attained. This is typically around 10 times the windspeed for efficient glider designs.

When seabirds perform dynamic soaring, the wind gradients are much less pronounced, so the energy extraction is comparably smaller. Instead of flying in circles as glider pilots do, birds commonly execute a series of half circles in opposite directions, in a zigzag pattern. An initial climb though the gradient while facing into the wind causes it to gain airspeed. It then makes an 180° turn and dives back through the same gradient but in the downwind direction, which again causes it to gain airspeed. It then makes an 180° turn at low altitude, in the other direction, to face back up into the wind... and the cycle repeats. By repeating the manoeuvre over and over it can make progress laterally to the wind while maintaining its airspeed, which enables it to travel in a cross-wind direction indefinitely.

As drag is slowing the bird, dynamic soaring is a tradeoff between speed lost to drag, and speed gained by moving through the wind gradient. At some point, climbing higher carries no additional benefit, as the wind gradient lessens with altitude.

== Birds ==
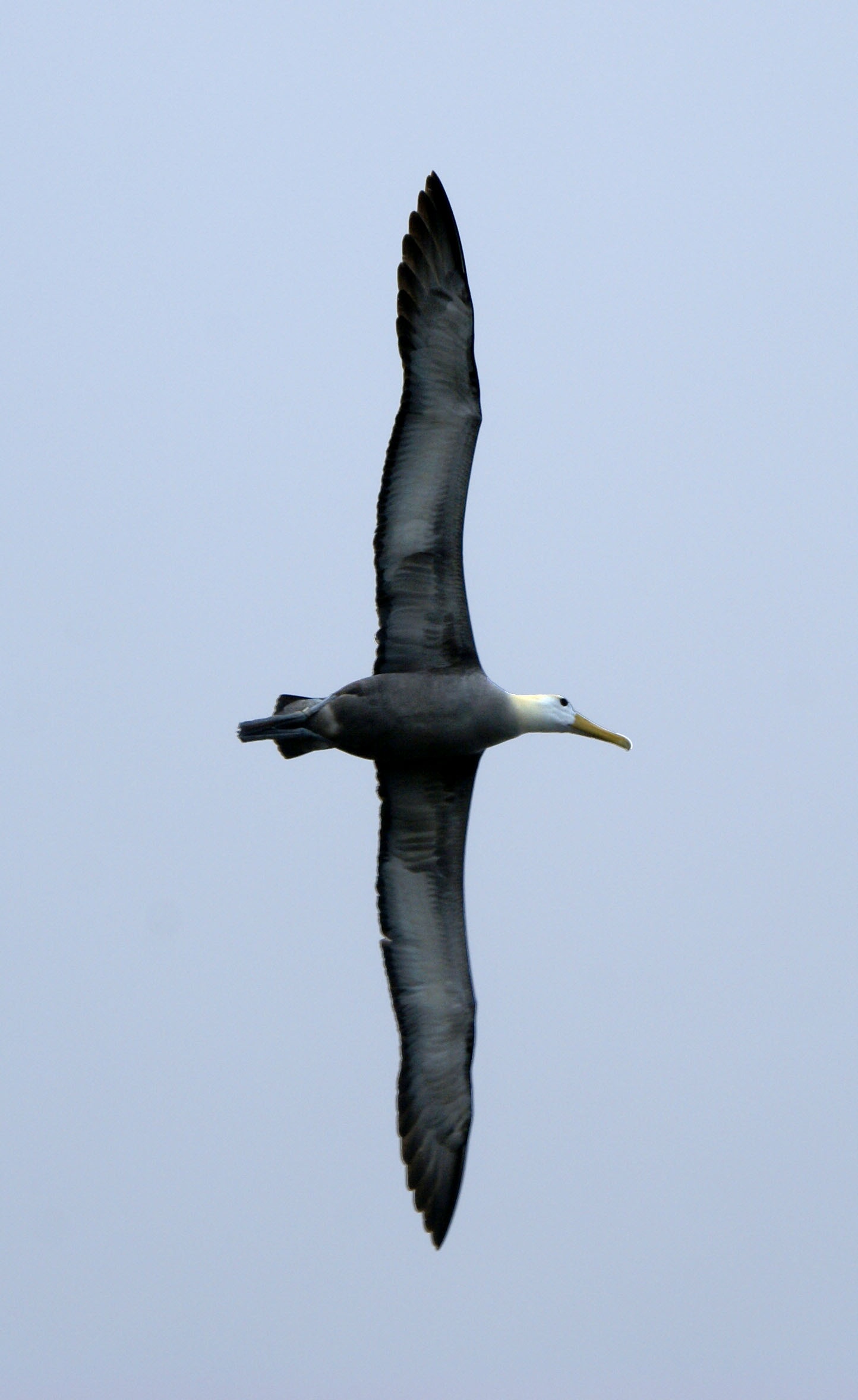
Waved albatross Phoebastria irrorata

Albatrosses are particularly adept at exploiting these techniques and can travel thousands of miles using very little energy. Gulls and terns also exhibit this behaviour in flight. Birds that soar dynamically have a skeletal structure that allows them to lock their wings when they are soaring, to reduce muscle tension and effort.

Lord Rayleigh first described dynamic soaring in 1883 in the British journal Nature:

...a bird without working his wings cannot, either in still air or in a uniform horizontal wind, maintain his level indefinitely. For a short time such maintenance is possible at the expense of an initial relative velocity, but this must soon be exhausted. Whenever therefore a bird pursues his course for some time without working his wings, we must conclude either
1. that the course is not horizontal,
2. that the wind is not horizontal, or
3. that the wind is not uniform.
It is probable that the truth is usually represented by (1) or (2); but the question I wish to raise is whether the cause suggested by (3) may not sometimes come into operation.

The first case described above by Rayleigh is simple gliding flight, the second is static soaring (using thermals, lee waves or slope soaring), and the last is dynamic soaring.

== Manned aircraft ==
In his 1975 book Streckensegelflug (published in English in 1978 as Cross-Country Soaring by the Soaring Society of America), Helmut Reichmann describes a flight made by Ingo Renner in a Glasflügel H-301 Libelle glider over Tocumwal in Australia on 24 October 1974. On that day there was no wind at the surface, but above an inversion at 300 meters there was a strong wind of about 70 km/h (40 knots). Renner took a tow up to about 350 m from where he dived steeply downwind until he entered the still air; he then pulled a 180-degree turn (with high g) and climbed back up again. On passing through the inversion he re-encountered the 70 km/h wind, this time as a head-wind. The additional air-speed that this provided enabled him to recover his original height. By repeating this manoeuvre he successfully maintained his height for around 20 minutes without the existence of ascending air, although he was drifting rapidly downwind. In later flights in a Pik 20 sailplane, he refined the technique so that he was able to eliminate the downwind drift and even make headway into the wind.

== Unmanned aircraft ==
Research continues into how the dynamic soaring technique could be adapted in unmanned aerial vehicles for enhancing their performance under a thrust-off condition. This could improve the endurance and range of the aircraft in austere conditions.

== Spacecraft ==
In theory, dynamic soaring could be used as a means to exceed the solar wind speed, by exploiting differences in this speed near the sun, the Earth, and/or the heliopause.

== Radio-controlled gliders ==
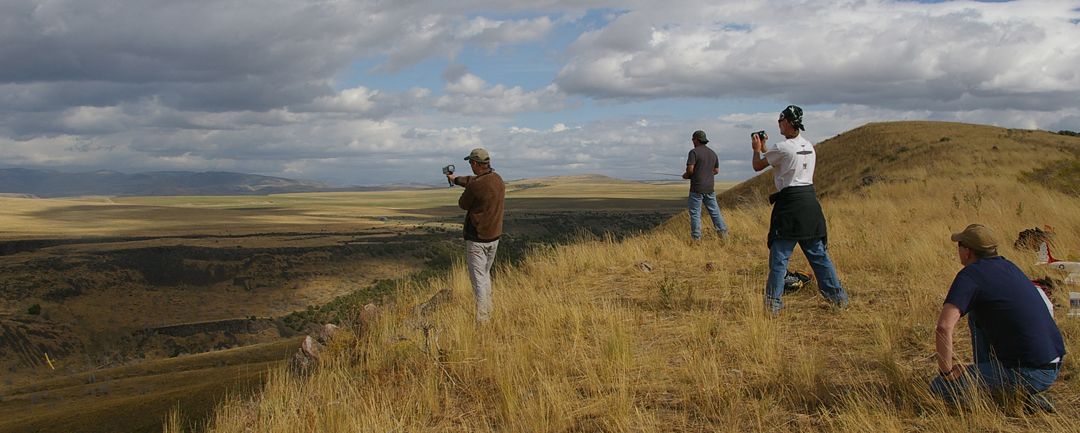
Dynamic soaring with R/C glider near Idaho Falls, Idaho. Wind direction is from right to left.

In the late 1990s, radio-controlled gliding awoke to the idea of dynamic soaring (a "discovery" largely credited to RC soaring luminary Joe Wurts). Radio-controlled glider pilots perform dynamic soaring using the leeward side of ground features such as ridges, saddles, or even rows of trees. If the ridge faces the wind, and has a steep back (leeward) side, it can cause flow separation off the top of the hill, resulting in a layer of fast air moving over the top of a volume of stagnant or reverse-flow air behind the hill. The velocity gradient, or wind shear, can be much greater than those used by birds or full scale sailplanes. The higher gradient allows for correspondingly greater energy extraction, resulting in much higher speeds for the aircraft. Models repeatedly cross the shear layer by flying in a circular path, penetrating a fast-moving headwind after flying up the back side, turning to fly with the wind, diving down through the shear layer into the stagnant air, and turning again to fly back up the back side of the hill. The loads caused by rapid turning at high speed (the fastest models can pull over 100g) require significant structural reinforcement in the fuselage and wing. Because of this, dynamic soaring models are commonly built using composite materials.

As of February 21, 2023, the highest reported ground speed for radio control dynamic soaring was 908kph or 564 mph (490 kn). There is no official sanctioning organization that certifies speeds, so records are listed unofficially based on readings from radar guns, although analysis from video footage and other sources is also used. Lately, some models have begun carrying on-board telemetry and other instruments to record such things as acceleration, air speed, etc.
