= Ridge lift =

Wind deflected upwards by an obstacle

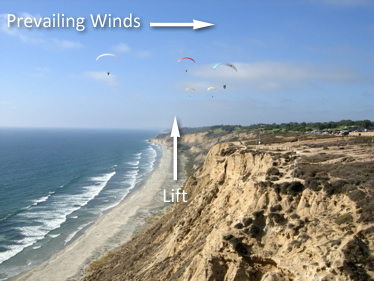
Ridge lift at Torrey Pines Gliderport in San Diego, CA

Ridge lift (or slope lift) is created when a wind strikes an obstacle, usually a mountain ridge or cliff, that is large and steep enough to deflect the wind upward.

If the wind is strong enough, the ridge lift provides enough upward force for gliders, hang gliders, paragliders and birds to stay airborne for long periods or travel great distances by 'Ridge soaring'. Although unpowered aircraft are usually descending through the air, they will climb if the surrounding air is rising faster than their sink rates. Model glider enthusiasts refer to this technique as "slope gliding" or "sloping".

Orville Wright used ridge lift, setting a duration record of 11 minutes in 1911. However the sport of soaring started in Germany after the First World War. In 1921, Dr. Wolfgang Klemperer broke the Wright Brothers’ 1911 soaring duration record with a flight of 13 minutes. In 1922, Arthur Martens became the first glider pilot to use an updraft rising along a mountain slope to stay aloft for a lengthy period, with a flight over an hour.

== Basic requirements ==
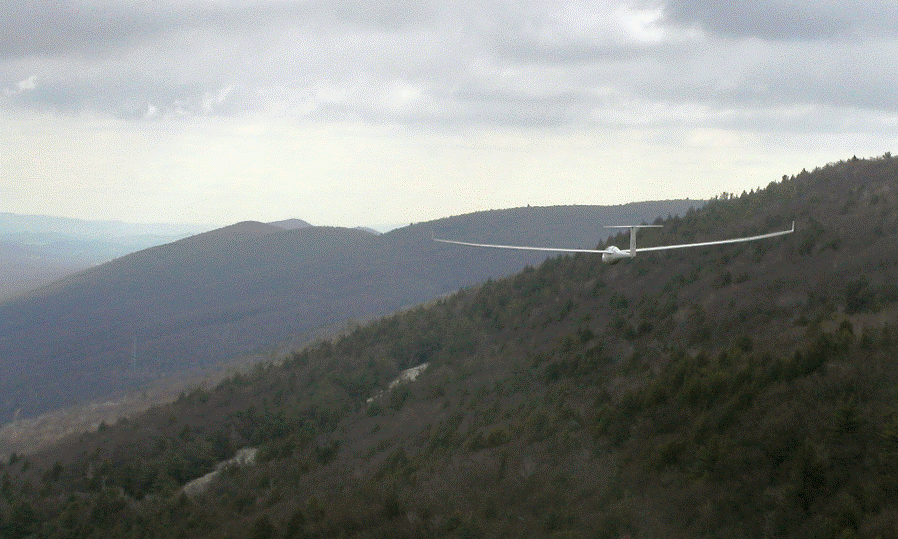
A Scimitar glider ridge soaring in Lock Haven, Pennsylvania USA

Ridge lift is generated when the wind blows against a hill, ridge, escarpment or ocean wave, causing the air to rise. In meteorology this is known as orographic lift. The wind creates a region of rising air directly above the slope, which may extend some distance upwards and outwards from its face because the airflow follows the upward contour of the hill. However, at near vertical cliffs, there is usually an area of turbulence with descending air near the base of the cliff. Downwind of the hill, lee waves can form; these are also used by glider pilots to gain height, but this should not be confused with slope lift.

Near slopes rather than vertical cliffs, the strongest lift is often to be found in a flight path that intersects with an imaginary line emerging at right angles from the slope.

Long mountain ranges such as those found in Ridge-and-valley Appalachians in the United States, New Zealand, and Chile have been used by glider pilots to fly in excess of a thousand kilometers in a single flight. Birds, such as many seabirds (in particular albatross) and raptors, also use slopes in this way.

== See also ==
Diagram of a slope with the zone of rising air in pale green

- Gliding – Recreational activity and competitive air sport
- Hang gliding – Unpowered glider air sport
- Paragliding – Soaring with a paraglider
- Radio-controlled glider – Type of radio-controlled aircraft
- Controllable slope soaring – Type of slope soaring where a slope is made to follow a walkalong glider
- Orographic lift – Air mass forced upwards as it moves over rising terrain
- Dynamic soaring – Flying technique
- Thermal – Column of rising air in the lower altitudes of Earth's atmosphere
- Lee wave – Atmospheric stationary oscillations
