= Controllable slope soaring =

Type of slope soaring where a slope is made to follow a walkalong glider

Person flying a Walkalong glider by controllable-slope soaring.

Controllable-slope soaring (also known as Walkalong gliding) is a type of slope soaring where a slope is made to follow a walkalong glider (a lightweight toy aircraft), both sustaining and controlling the glider's trajectory by modifying the wind in the vicinity of the airplane.

A controllable slope is any object which can be used to affect the air under the airplane: a piece of cardboard, the pilot's hands or even head. The controllable slope is usually manipulated by a person following the glider in flight (please see photo at right).

Controllable-slope soaring allows a glider to achieve sustained flight without the need for an onboard aircraft engine or onboard flight control system.

== See also ==
- Gliding flight
- History of human-powered aircraft
- Orographic lift
- Ridge lift
- Soaring
- Walkalong glider
