= Sasan (disambiguation) =

Sasan is a 2nd-century ancestor of the Iranian House of Sasan.

Sasan or Sassan may also refer to:

== People ==
- House of Sasan, ruled the Sasanian Empire from 224 to 651
- Sasan V, a mythological character from the Dasatir
- Sasan (Apraca), Indo-Scythian king
- Sasan Ansari (born 1991), Iranian footballer
- Sassan Behnam-Bakhtiar (born 1984), Iranian-French artist
- Sasan Ghandehari, Iranian-born British billionaire
- Sasan Hosseini (born 1999), Iranian footballer
- Sassan Sanei (born 1973), Canadian engineer
- Loveleen Kaur Sasan (born 1990), Indian actress

== Places ==
- Sasan (land grant), a tax-free royal fief given to the Charanas
- Sasan, Una, a village in Una district, Himachal Pradesh, India
- Sasan Castle, a fortress in Qazvin province, Iran
- Sasan Gir, a forest, national park, and wildlife sanctuary in Gujarat, India
- Sasan Ultra Mega Power Project, Singrauli district, Madhya Pradesh, India

== See also ==
- Sazan Island, Albania, in the Mediterranean
- Sasanian Empire
