= Zabłudowicz =

Zabłudowicz is a Polish surname. Notable people with the surname include:

- Anita Zabludowicz (born 1960), British contemporary art collector and philanthropist
- Poju Zabludowicz (born 1953), Finnish-British-Israeli billionaire businessman, art collector and philanthropist.
- Shlomo Zabludowicz (1914–1994), Polish-born Israeli businessman
