= Belldegrun =

Belldegrun is a surname. Notable people with the surname include:

- Arie Belldegrun (born 1949), Israeli-American urologic oncologist, and billionaire businessman
- Rebecka Belldegrun (born 1950), Finnish-born Israeli-American billionaire businesswoman
