= Sasan Ghandehari =

Iranian-born British billionaire venture capitalist

- Born: Hossein Ghandehari; 1964 or 1965 (age 60–61); Iran
- Citizenship: British
- Occupation: Venture capitalist
- Spouse: Yassmin Ghandehari
- Mother: Hourieh Peramaa

Hossein "Sasan" Ghandehari (born 1965) is an Iranian-born British billionaire venture capitalist, and the only son of Hourieh Peramaa, a Kazakh-born billionaire property investor.

Ghandehari and his wife Yassmin Ghandehari are based in London, and are prominent art collectors of "impressionism, postwar and contemporary" art, such as Cy Twombly.

In January 2026, Ghandehari's $10 billion family trust paid for Nigel Farage to attend the World Economic Forum in Davos as their representative.

== Personal life ==
Sasan Ghandehari is married to Yassmin Ghandehari, a Tehran-born interior designer Yassmin Ghandehari, who looks after her mother-in-law's real-estate empire. As of 2015, Yassmin is a patron of the Tate (giving more than £10,000 per annum), and on the advisory board for the Sotheby's, and the development council of the University of the Arts, London.

In July 2002, Ghandehari bought a house at no.33 The Bishops Avenue in north London for £4.2 million. In 2006, the Ghandehari family bought two plots that became Wyldewood, using an offshore trust run by Yassmin, where they lived until 2007. In November 2007, they bought no 24 using another offshore trust also run by Yassmin for £4.9 million, and a plot of land behind no. 31 for about £900,000.

In 2008, Ghandehari, Yassmin and his mother Hourieh Peramaa bought Toprak Mansion on The Bishops Avenue (built in the 1990s by Halis Toprak) for about £50 million, and renamed it "Royal Mansion". In 2008, The Times alleged that the real beneficial owner of the property is Nursultan Nazarbayev, president of Kazakhstan from 1991 to 2019.

Ghandehari is expected to become a donor for Reform UK.
