= Rebecka =

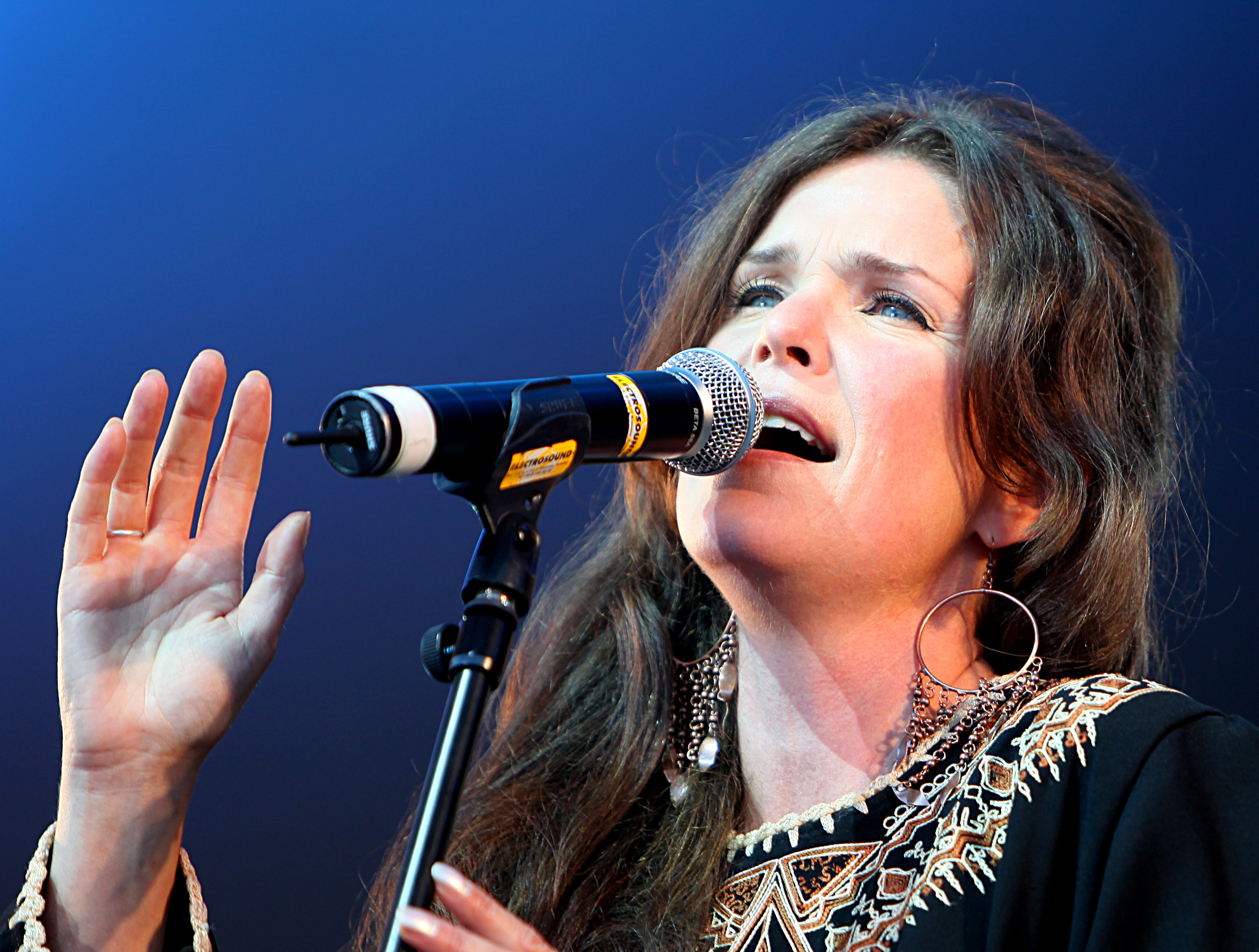
- Swedish musician, Rebecka Törnqvist
- Gender: Female
- Language: Swedish

Origin
- Region of origin: Sweden

Other names
- Related names: Rebecca

Rebecka is the Swedish form of female name Rebecca.

== People named Rebecka ==
- Rebecka Belldegrun (born 1950), American ophthalmologist, businesswoman, and investor
- Rebecka Hemse (born 1975), Swedish actress
- Rebecka Le Moine (born 1990), Swedish politician
- Rebecka Liljeberg (born 1981), Swedish actress
- Rebecka Mendelssohn (1811–1858), German salonist
- Rebecka Törnqvist (born 1964), Swedish singer
- Rebecka Blomqvist (born 1997), Swedish footballer
