= St Anne's House, East Finchley =

Coordinates: 51.590744°N 0.175030°W

St Anne's House is a grade II listed building in East End Road, East Finchley, London. The house was built in the early nineteenth century with mid century additions.
