= Toprak =

Toprak is a masculine given name and a surname of Turkish origin. In Turkish, toprak means "earth" or "soil". Notable people with the name include:

== Given name ==
- Toprak Razgatlıoğlu (born 1996), Turkish motorcycle racer

== Surname ==
- Abdullah Toprak (born 2000), Turkish wrestler
- Acelya Toprak (born 1998), British judoka of Azerbaijani origin
- Erdoğan Toprak (born 1961), Turkish politician and businessman
- Halis Toprak (1938–2016), Turkish businessman
- Mehmet Emin Toprak (1974–2002), Turkish actor
- Menekşe Toprak (born 1970), German-Turkish writer
- Ömer Toprak (born 1989), Turkish football player
- Pınar Toprak (born 1980), Turkish composer
