= Two River =

New York-based venture capital firm and merchant bank

- Type: Limited liability company
- Industry: Private equity, venture capital
- Founded: 2004
- Founder: Joshua Kazam; David Tanen
- Headquarters: New York City, New York
- Key people: Arie Belldegrun (Chairman)
- Products: Venture capital, equity investment, investment management
- Website: www.tworiver.com

Two River is a New York-based venture capital firm and merchant bank focused on the life science sector. It specializes in investments in life science, biotechnology, and in firms focused on developing preventive and therapeutic technologies for a broad spectrum of disease areas including oncology, cardiovascular disease, neurological disorders, and companion animal health care.

Two River was founded in September 2004 by partners Joshua Kazam, Peter Kash, David Tanen, and Benjamin Bernstein. Dr. Arie Belldegrun joined the firm in 2008 as its Chairman and Partner.

The firm has offices in New York City and Los Angeles.

== Portfolio ==
Currently, Two River holds equity stakes in the following life science companies:

- Two River Bio
- Candid Therapeutics
- Allogene Therapeutics - a biotechnology company.
- Breakthrough Properties - a life science real estate development company
- Hubble - a brand of contact lenses sold directly to consumers through an e-commerce, subscription-only model.
- Kronos Bio - a research and development of therapies that modulate historically recalcitrant cancer targets.
- Neogene Therapeutics - a biomedical company developing T cell therapies that target mutated proteins (neo-antigens) in cancer.
- UroGen Pharma - a clinical-stage pharmaceutical company developing therapies with a focus on euro-oncology.

Past holdings:

- Arno Therapeutics - a clinical-stage bio-pharmaceutical company that is developing products for the treatment of cancer.
- Capricor Therapeutics - a clinical stage biotechnology company developing biological therapies for cardiac and other serious medical conditions.
- Cell Design Labs (acquired by Gilead Sciences) - a private bio-therapeutics company
- Edgemont Pharmaceuticals - a privately held pharmaceutical company in the field of neuroscience.
- Kite Pharma (acquired by Gilead Sciences) - ac linical-stage biopharmaceutical company focused on developing engineered autologous cell therapy products for the treatment of cancer.
- Sienna Biopharmaceuticals - discovery, clinical development and commercialization of products in dermatology and aesthetics
- Velcera (acquired by Perrigo) - develops pet medicines in pain management, anti-allergy and parasiticides
- Veterinary Prime - pet nutrition products for dogs and cats, sold through veterinarians.

== Business history ==
- In May 2013, Kite Pharma completed a $35 million financing of Series A preferred stock.
- In October 2013, Arno Therapeutics completed a $30.7 million financing of equity.
- In November 2013, Nile Therapeutics completed a merger with Capricor to form Capricor Therapeutics. Capricor has become a wholly owned subsidiary of the Nile.
- In February 2014, Velcera was acquired by Perrigo for $160 million.
- In April 2014, Kite Pharma completed a $50 million mezzanine private financing of convertible notes, and in May, the company filed a registration with the SEC for an IPO of its common stock, with a proposed maximum offering price of $115 million. The company listed on the NASDAQ Global Market under the symbol "KITE." The company planned to raise $78 million by offering 6 million shares at a price range of $12.00 to $14.00. At the midpoint of the proposed range, Kite Pharma would command a market value of $548 million. On June 20, 2014, 7.5 million shares of Kite Pharma, priced at $17 a share began trading on the NASDAQ, indicating a market valuation of $632.4 million for the company.
- In March 2017, it was reported that Two River has participated in a $16.5 million Series A round of funding for Hubble.
- On October 11, 2018, Allogene Therapeutics raised $324 million in an initial public offering on the NASDAQ, listing under the ticker "ALLO".
