= Pantheon, London =

English entertainment venue (1772–1937)

Coordinates: 51.5155°N 0.1381°W

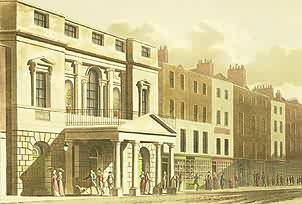
The Pantheon in Oxford Street, London.

The Pantheon was a place of public entertainment on the south side of Oxford Street, London, England. It was designed by James Wyatt and opened in 1772. The main rotunda was one of the largest rooms built in England up to that time and had a central dome somewhat reminiscent of the celebrated Pantheon in Rome. It was built as a set of winter assembly rooms and later briefly converted into a theatre. Before being demolished in 1937, it was a bazaar and a wine merchant's show room for over a hundred years. Marks and Spencer's "Oxford Street Pantheon" branch, at 173 Oxford Street now occupies the site.

== Construction ==
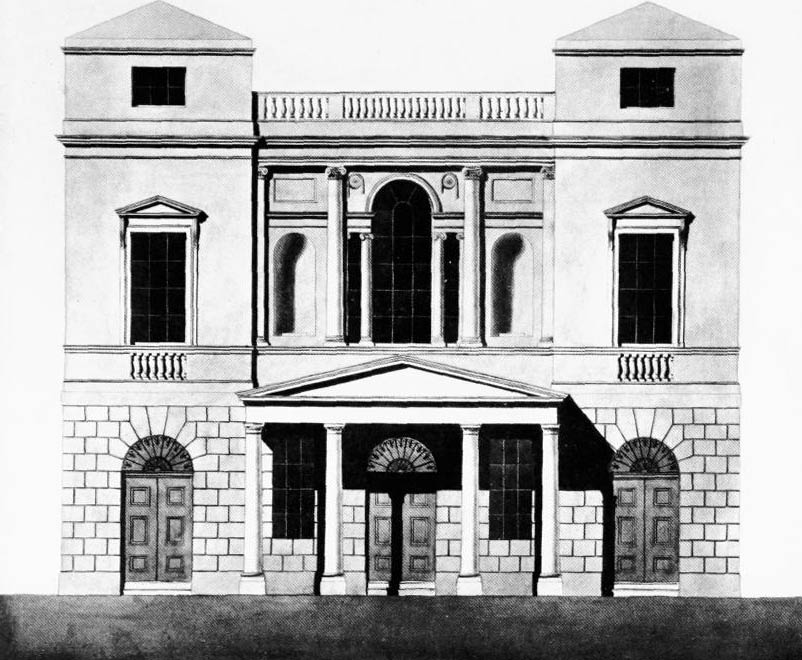
The Oxford Street facade.

The Pantheon was promoted by Philip Elias Turst, of whose life very little else is known. In 1769 he inherited a plot of land which had a frontage of 54 feet (16 m) on Oxford Street and contained two houses, behind which there was a large piece of ground enclosed by the gardens of houses in Great Marlborough Street, Poland Street and Oxford Street. He had some connections with fashionable society, including a lady of means named Margaretta Maria Ellice, who was involved in the management of a fashionable set of assembly rooms in Soho Square. Miss Ellice was briefly Turst's main financial backer, and took soundings to ensure that a new place of public entertainment on an ambitious scale for the winter season similar to Ranelagh Gardens for the summer, would be "likely to meet with the Approbation of the Nobility in General". This assurance being forthcoming the scheme went ahead.

After falling out with Miss Ellice, who had initially agreed to buy thirty of the fifty shares in the business for £10,000, but soon withdrew, Turst issued fifty shares at £500 each and found buyers for all of them except one, which he kept for himself. This provided a budget of £25,000 and work began in mid-1769.

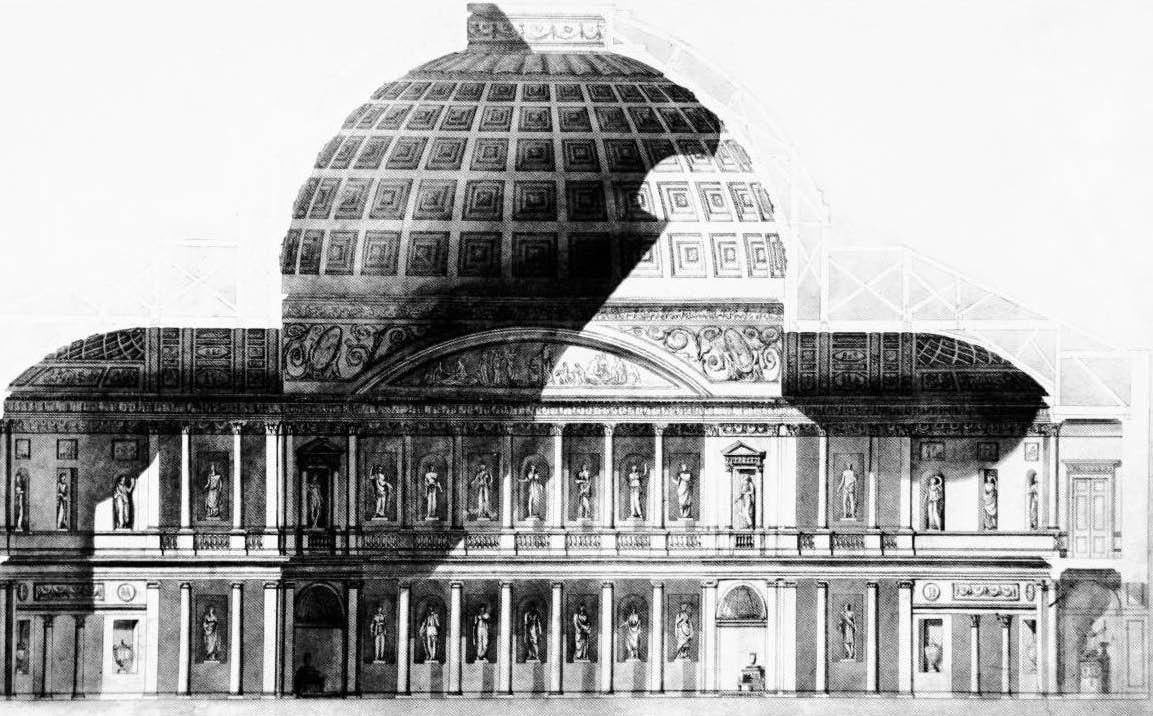
A cross section of the rotunda, showing the dome and the colonnades.

Turst soon found himself in legal conflict, not only with Miss Ellice, but also with some of his new investors, as the budget was exceeded, but in January 1772 the Pantheon was completed. The architect chosen for the job was James Wyatt. He was to become one of the most prominent British architects of his generation, but at that time he was unknown and aged just twenty-two or twenty-three. He appears to have had some sort of indirect connection with Turst, perhaps through his older brother Samuel, who was to be the main contractor for the project.

The artists and craftsmen involved included the plasterer Joseph Rose, the sculptor Joseph Nollekens, who was paid £160 for four statues of Britannia, Liberty, the King and the Queen, and John Stretzle, who built the organ for £300.

In August 1769, Turst purchased a leasehold house on the west side of Poland Street which backed on to the site of the Pantheon and built a secondary entrance there. This unbudgeted cost added more fuel to the legal fire. In 1771 one of the shareholders filed a bill of complaint against Turst in the Court of Chancery, complaining of dishonest treatment. In 1773 and again in 1782 Turst in his turn filed complaints against several other shareholders. The outcome of these suits is not known.

== The building ==
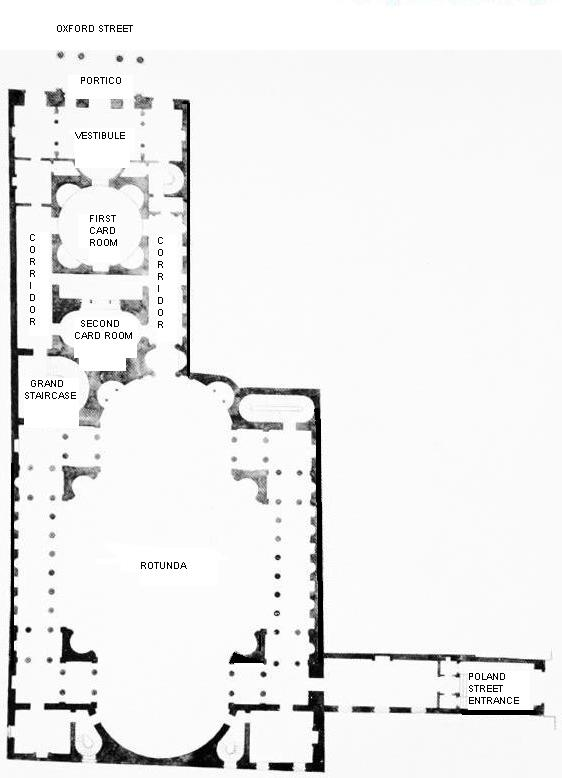
Plan.

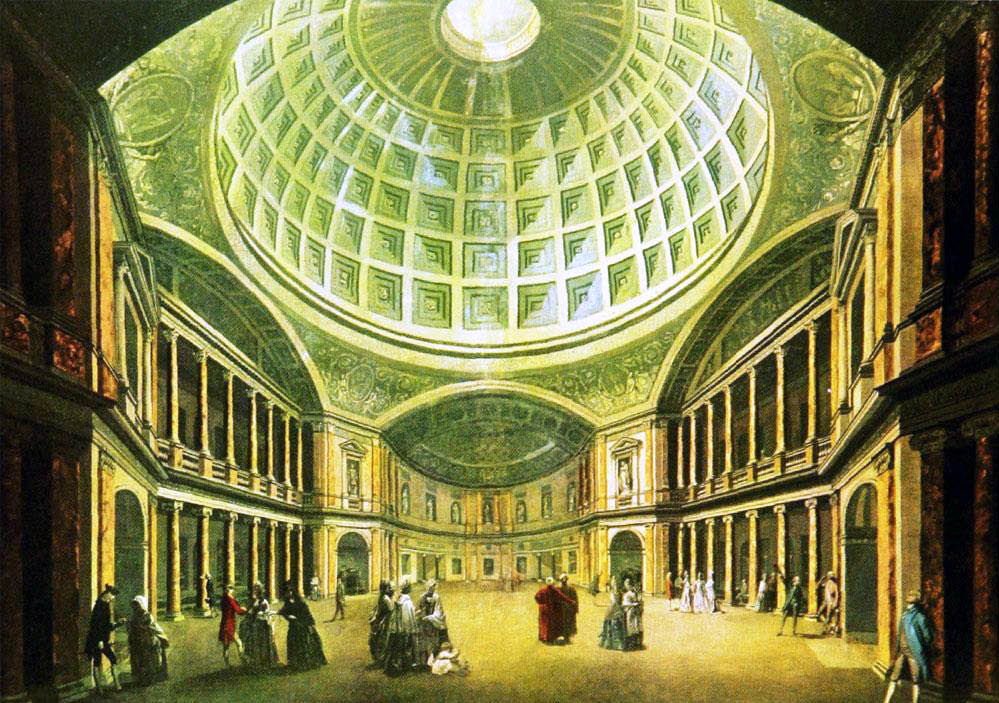
A painting of the interior in its original form.

The main part of the site consisted of two rectangles of land. The smaller of these was towards Oxford Street. There, the main doorway, sheltered by a portico, and the two side doorways opened to a vestibule, 50 feet (15 m) wide and 15 feet (4.6 m) deep, which was divided by screen colonnades into three compartments. A central set of doors opened into the first of two card rooms, and two further pairs of doors opened onto corridors or galleries, giving access to the grand staircase and the great assembly room or rotunda. The total depth of the site was 204 feet (62 m) and the maximum width was 96 feet 3 inches (29.34 m).

There is general agreement that the scheme of the great room, or rotunda, was derived from Santa Sophia in Istanbul. The central space was contained in a square of 60 feet (18 m) topped by a coffered dome. On the east and west sides were superimposed colonnades of seven bays, screening the aisles and first floor galleries. At the north and south end there were short arms, 40 feet (12 m) wide, terminating in shallow segmental apses. The architectural elements and decorations were strictly Roman in inspiration. Below the rotunda there was a tea and supper room, of the same shape but divided into five aisles by the piers supporting the floor above.

The architecture of the Pantheon was lavishly praised by many of those who saw it. Horace Walpole compared Wyatt's work favourably with that of better established and very fashionable Robert Adam, "the Pantheon is still the most beautiful edifice in England" he said. Dr. Burney, writing long after the destruction of the original building by fire (an event which inflicted on him a heavy financial loss), stated that the Pantheon "was built by Mr. James Wyatt, and regarded both by natives and foreigners, as the most elegant structure in Europe, if not on the globe… . No person of taste in architecture or music, who remembers the Pantheon, its exhibitions, its numerous, splendid, and elegant assemblies, can hear it mentioned without a sigh!"

Contemporary reports of the cost of the building were greatly exaggerated. Writing to Sir Horace Mann in May 1770 Horace Walpole asked "What do you think of a winter Ranelagh erecting in Oxford Road, at the expense of sixty thousand pounds?". The courts later determined that the actual cost was £36,965 19s. 5½d: £27,407 2s. 11½d for the main construction work, £2,500 for the entrance from Poland Street and £7,058 16s. 6d for furniture, paintings, statues, the organ, and Wyatt's five per cent commission as architect.

== History ==
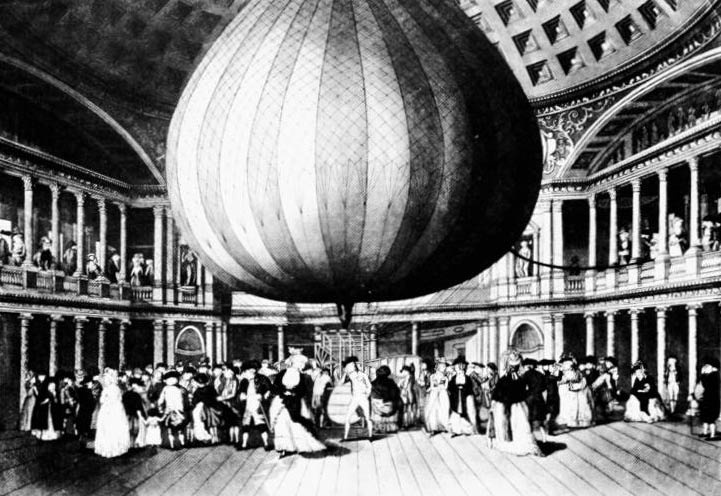
Vincenzo Lunardi's balloon exhibited at the Pantheon.

The Pantheon opened on Monday, 27 January 1772. Up to fifty pounds was paid for tickets for the first night which attracted over seventeen hundred members of high society including all the foreign ambassadors and eight dukes and duchesses. Initially the social tone was very high (though a policy that patrons should only be admitted on the recommendation of a peeress was soon dropped), and good profits were made. During the first winter there were assemblies only, without dancing or music, three times a week. In subsequent seasons the entertainments included assemblies, masquerades (masked balls) and subscription concerts.

In the 1780s the popularity of the Pantheon declined. However, one of the commemoration concerts celebrating the 25th anniversary of George Frideric Handel's death was held in the Pantheon in 1784. Another popular event was a hot air balloon demonstration by 'The Daredevil Aeronaut' - Vincenzo Lunardi in 1785 where the balloon was deflated by broken glass in the dome.

After the destruction of the King's Theatre in The Haymarket by fire in 1789, the Pantheon was converted into an opera house on a twelve-year lease at £3,000 per annum. James Wyatt was once again the architect. After only one complete season of opera the Pantheon was burnt to the ground in 1792. Tate Britain holds a watercolour entitled The Pantheon, the Morning after the Fire, which is attributed (although not without dispute) to the 16-year-old J. M. W. Turner.

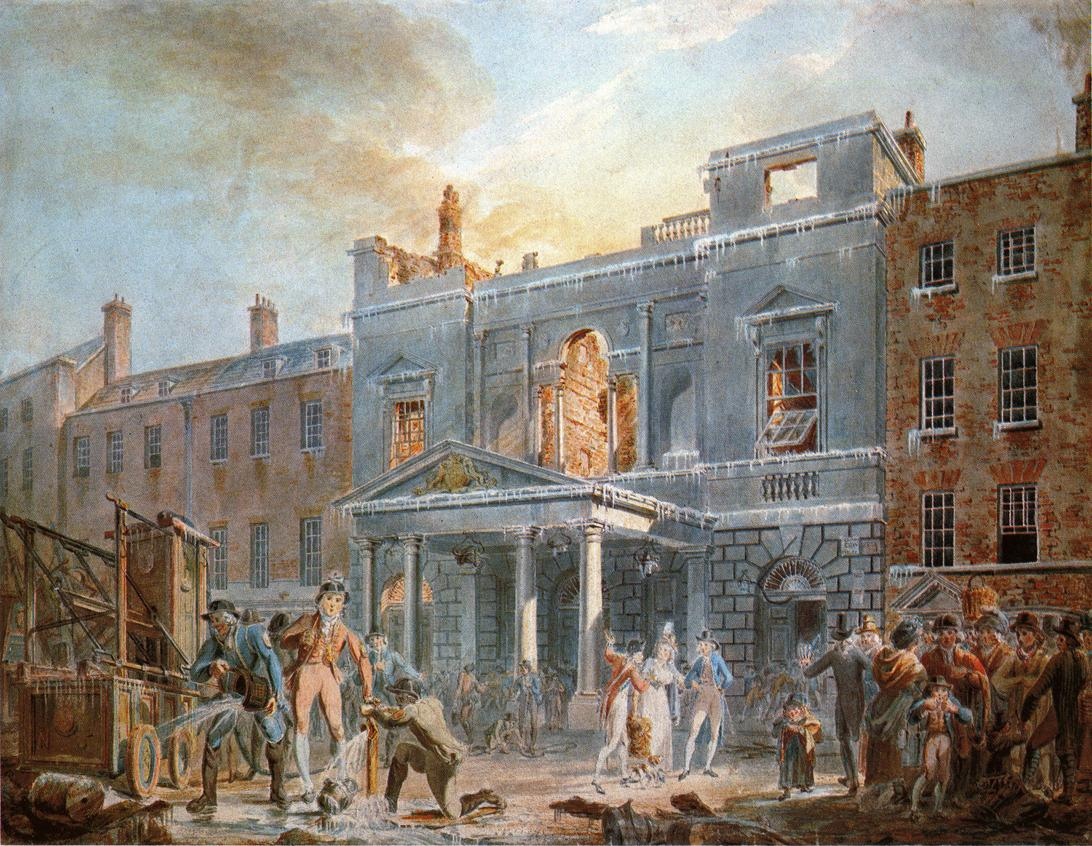
The Pantheon, the Morning after the Fire, 1792, attributed to J. M. W. Turner

By 1795 the structure had been rebuilt in a similar but not identical form and it was leased as a place of assembly by one Crispus Claggett, who intended to provide masquerades and concerts. The principal room of this reincarnation was not a rotunda but consisted of "an Area or Pit, … and a double tier of elegant and spacious Boxes, in the centre of which is a most splendid one for the Royal Family". The Pantheon reopened with a masquerade on 9 April 1795. The revived assembly rooms were a failure, and in 1796 or 1797 Claggett disappeared and was never heard of again.

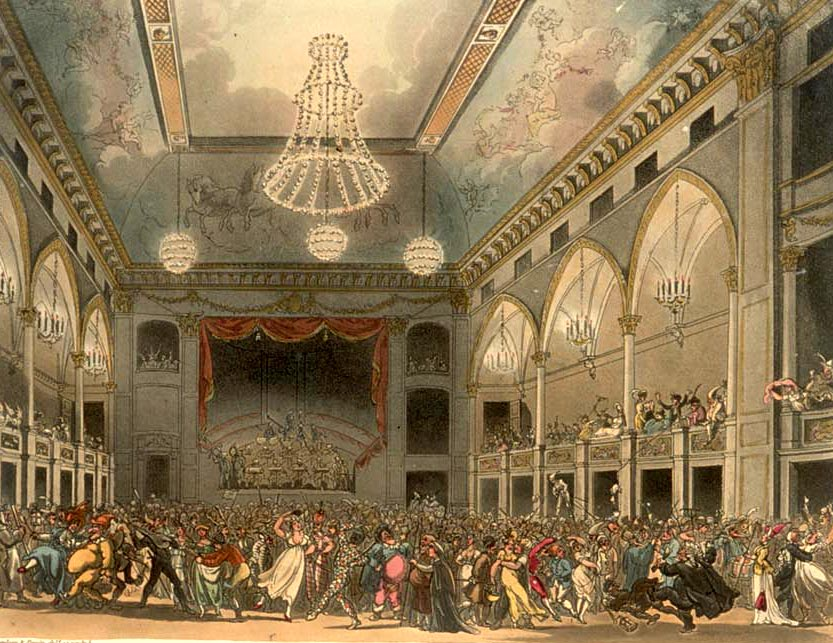
A masquerade in the rebuilt and modified Pantheon, circa 1808.

From 1798 to 1810 the shareholders reverted to the original custom of managing the Pantheon themselves but the popularity of the entertainments continued to decline. In 1811–12 Nicholas Wilcox Cundy converted the building into a theatre, but restrictions imposed by the Lord Chamberlain (then the regulator and censor of theatres) ruined this venture and the career of the Pantheon as a place of public entertainment came to a close in 1814.

In 1833–34, the Pantheon was rebuilt as a bazaar by the architect Sydney Smirke. The whole of the roof and part of the walls of the old building were taken down, but the entrance fronts to both Oxford Street and Poland Street were retained, as were also the rooms immediately behind the former. The main space of the new building was a great hall of basilican plan, with a barrel-vaulted nave of five wide bays. In 1867, the building was acquired by W. and A. Gilbey, wine merchants, and was used by them as offices and show rooms until 1937.

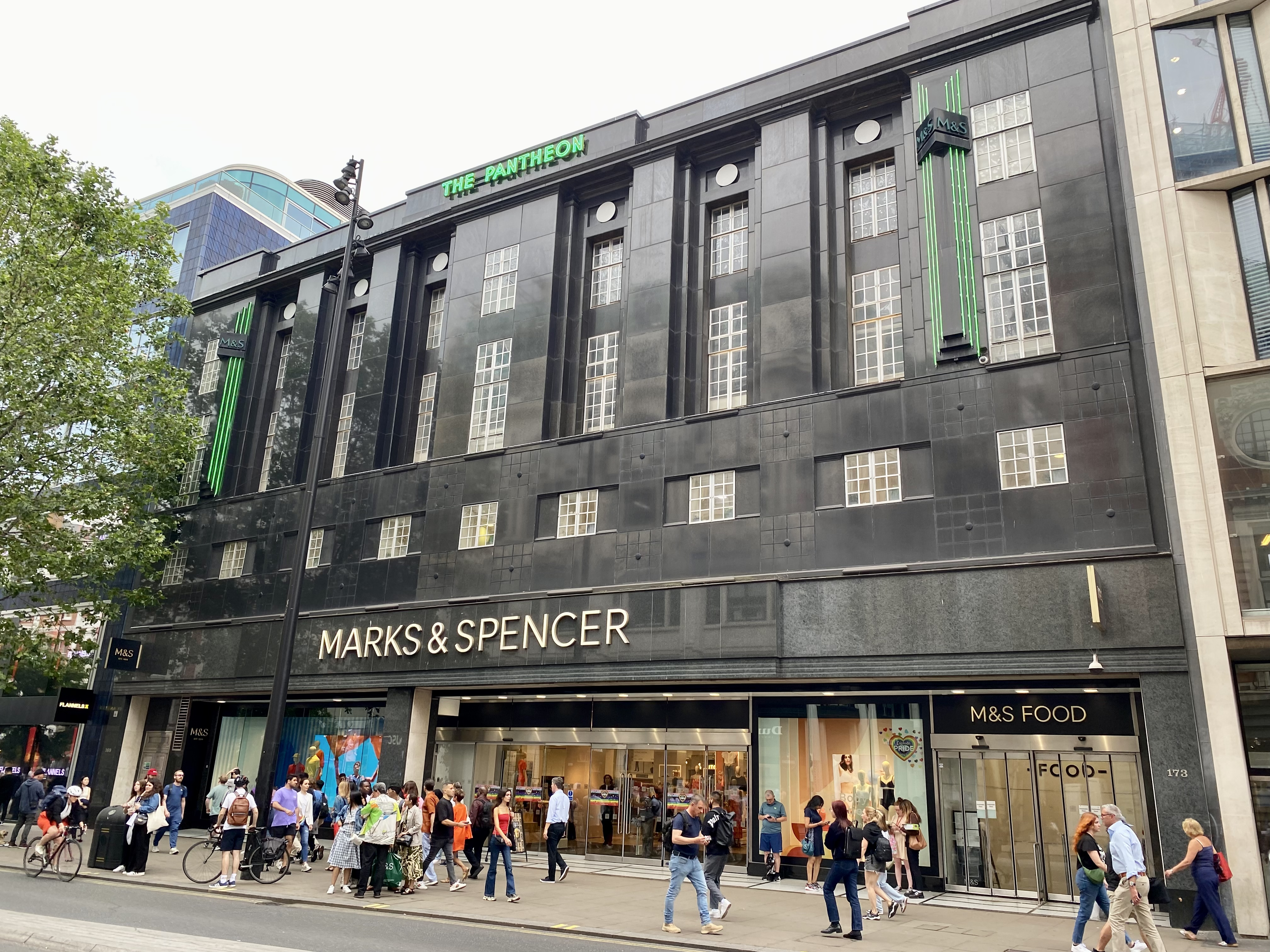
"The Pantheon": a branch of Marks & Spencer, opened on the site in 1938.

It was demolished shortly afterwards to make way for a branch of Marks and Spencer, the Georgian Group unsuccessfully attempting to preserve the façade elsewhere. The Marks and Spencer building opened in 1938, and is still there. This was designed by Robert Lutyens (son of Sir Edwin Lutyens). It has a gleaming art deco polished black granite façade and has become a distinctive landmark on Oxford Street. Its special historic and architectural interest was recognised on 21 September 2009 when the Minister of Culture, Barbara Follett, awarded the building Grade II listed status.

== See also ==
- List of demolished buildings and structures in London
- 18th-century Western domes
