= The Bishops Avenue =

Street in London, England

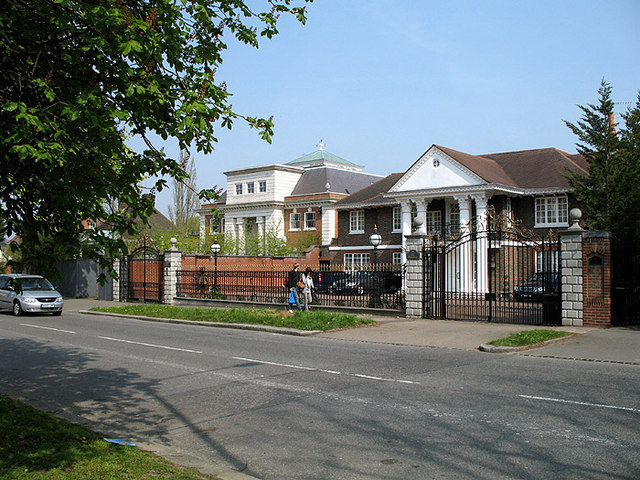
- Houses on The Bishops Avenue

- Location within Greater London
- Namesake: Arthur Winnington-Ingram, Bishop of London from 1901 to 1939
- Location: London, United Kingdom
- Nearest tube station: East Finchley
- Coordinates: 51°34′41″N 0°10′14″W

The Bishops Avenue is a residential road in north London, England, connecting the north edge of Hampstead Heath at Kenwood (Hampstead Lane) to East Finchley and lies near the boundary between the London Boroughs of Barnet and Haringey. It is considered to be one of the wealthiest streets in the world. The road is often referred to by its nickname of "Billionaires' Row".

== History ==
The Bishops Avenue was constructed in circa 1887 on land formerly forming part of the Bishop of London's hunting park. The estate had passed to the Ecclesiastical Commissioners in 1868. The road followed a winding course through Bishop's Wood to the south and farmland to the north.

Residential development began in 1894. Plots were generally leased for 99 years, although some leases extended to 999 years. Early leaseholders included the provision merchant George Sainsbury (of Sainsbury's) in 1898 and chronometer manufacturer Christian Carl Lorensen in 1901. Twelve houses with substantial grounds had been built by 1906. The surrounding open spaces which are now Hampstead Heath, Hampstead Garden Suburb and Hampstead Golf Course contributed to the area’s relatively rural character.

During the twentieth century, the avenue became associated with wealthy industrialists, entertainers and international property owners. Its former residents included holiday-camp founder Sir Billy Butlin and actress and singer Dame Gracie Fields.

Together with Winnington Road and Ingram Avenue, it is named after Arthur Winnington-Ingram, who as Bishop of London owned much of the surrounding area following a land grant in 1904. Most of the land was sold privately in the early 20th century, and today only one house on the road is owned by the Church (46, The Bishops Avenue) and a nearby residential home.

== Architecture ==
The avenue contains houses in a variety of architectural styles, including Arts and Crafts, neo-Georgian and classical designs. During the late twentieth and early twenty-first centuries, some earlier houses were demolished or substantially altered, while several large plots were subdivided. Apartment developments have also been constructed on the road.

== Properties ==
The 66-house (or 110 including cul-de-sacs) street runs downhill north–south and with the parallel Winnington Road. Average property prices on the avenue surpassed £1 million in the late 1980. In 2006, the smallest houses in the street were selling for £5 million. Homes on the street are on the market for up to £65 million.

Ten of the houses on the street owned by the House of Saud were sold for £73 million.

In June 2026, number 39 sold for £30 million.

=== Heath Hall ===
Heath Hall, originally known as East Weald, is a Grade II listed house at number 59. It was built in 1910 as the London residence of William Park Lyle, of the Tate & Lyle family, to designs by Henry Victor Ashley and F. Winton Newman. The red-brick house incorporates Arts and Crafts detailing and was listed in November 2001. It is now owned by Daniel Křetínský.

=== Toprak Mansion ===
Toprak Mansion (at 46A), subsequently known as Royal Mansion, was built in the 1990s for Turkish businessman Halis Toprak. The approximately 30,000-square-foot (2,800 m²) house reportedly sold for £50 million in 2008 to Kazakh billionaire Hourieh Peramaa. A former head of Kazakhstan’s security service subsequently alleged that the beneficial owner was Nursultan Nazarbayev, then president of Kazakhstan.

=== Vacant properties ===
In 2014, The Guardian reported that 16 properties, with an estimated combined value of £350 million, are derelict and have been vacant for several decades. According to one resident, perhaps only three of the houses are occupied on a full-time basis.

Most of the properties in the most expensive part of the avenue are registered to companies in tax havens including the British Virgin Islands, Curaçao, the Bahamas, Panama, and the Channel Islands, allowing international owners to remain anonymous.

On 21 July 2023, approximately 70 firefighters and ten fire engines attended a fire at a derelict three-storey house on the avenue. The roof was destroyed, and parts of the ground and first floors were damaged. London Fire Brigade recorded the cause as undetermined.

== Notable residents and owners ==
Owners of houses on the street include publisher Richard Desmond, businessman Daniel Křetínský, Iranian Supreme Leader Mojtaba Khamenei and businessman Ali Ansari, whose company Birch Ventures was reported to own twelve properties on the road. Businessman Mahdi Al Tajir was identified in 2024 as the owner of the former Oak Lodge site, being redeveloped in partnership with Valouran. Art collectors Anita and Poju Zabludowicz were reported in 2014 to live in a house they had built on the avenue. Nurali Aliyev, grandson of former Kazakh president Nursultan Nazarbayev, was reported in 2020 to occupy a mansion there with his family.

Historical residents and owners have included businessman George Sainsbury, sugar manufacturer William Park Lyle, actress and singer Dame Gracie Fields, holiday-camp founder Sir Billy Butlin, businessmen Nemir Kirdar and Asil Nadir, and Heather Mills (the former wife of Paul McCartney). Theatre producer Sir Peter Saunders (producer of the play The Mousetrap) and television presenter Katie Boyle also lived on the avenue. Other residents have included the Sultan of Brunei and members of the House of Bolkiah, author Salman Rushdie and businessman Jaweed al-Ghussein. Businessman Emil Savundra and fashion entrepreneur Aristos Constantinou were also residents.

Former owners include industrialist Lakshmi Mittal, who sold Summer Palace in 2011; businessman Halis Toprak, who commissioned Toprak Mansion; and Henry Oppenheim and his wife, politician Sally Oppenheim-Barnes, who owned Barons Court. Property developer Andreas Panayiotou previously owned Heath Hall.

Reported residents and temporary tenants have included actress Salma Hayek and her husband, businessman François-Henri Pinault, singers Justin Bieber and Ariana Grande, and footballers Olivier Giroud and Hugo Lloris. Grande reportedly rented an apartment in the Buxmead development while filming Wicked.

== See also ==
- Billionaires' Row
