= Anita Zabludowicz =

British art collector and gallery owner

- Born: Anita Steinman; 1960 or 1961 (age 65–66); Newcastle upon Tyne, England
- Occupation: Art collector
- Known for: Art collection, philanthropy
- Spouse: Poju Zabludowicz
- Children: 4
- Relatives: Arie Belldegrun (brother-in-law); Rebecka Belldegrun (sister-in-law)

Anita Ruth Zabludowicz OBE (/ˌzæbləˈdoʊvɪtʃ/ ZAB-lə-DOH-vitch; born December 1960) is a British contemporary art collector and philanthropist. She is married to Poju Zabludowicz.

Since the 1990s, Anita and Poju Zabludowicz have been accumulating a 500-artist, 5,000-piece collection of contemporary artwork, the Zabludowicz Collection.

In 2015 Zabludowicz received an OBE for her services to the arts. She appears on Artnet's The 100 Most Powerful Women in Art list.

== Biography ==
Anita Steinman was born in Newcastle upon Tyne, England. Her mother was an art historian and her father, Harry Steinman, was a wholesale businessman and the local chairman of the Variety Club. She studied interior architecture at the Inchbald School of Design, London.

Zabludowicz is married to Finnish-born Poju Zabludowicz.

Anita and Poju Zabludowicz have sponsored exhibitions and art fairs, and organised various fundraising events. In 2014, they donated funds towards the realisation of the planned Helsinki Guggenheim.

The Zabludowicz Center for Autoimmune Diseases opened in Sheba Medical Center through Anita and Poju Zabludowicz's donations. The center centralises under one roof all aspects of autoimmune research and treatment, and brings together physicians and researchers from multidisciplinary fields such as internal medicine, clinical immunology, autoimmunity, rheumatology, ophthalmology, neurology, obstetrics and gynaecology.

In June 2016, it was announced that ARTA, a fine art shipping startup based in New York, has raised $1 million in capital from a group of institutional and strategic investors, among them Anita and Poju Zabludowicz.

=== Art collection ===
Zabludowicz first began collecting modern British art in 1994 when she bought a painting by Ben Nicholson.

==== Zabludowicz Collection ====
Since the 1990s, Anita and Poju Zabludowicz have been accumulating a 500-artist, 5,000-piece collection of contemporary artwork. They exhibit their private art collection at three different locations, one of them being 176, a gallery in a former 19th-century Methodist chapel in Chalk Farm, north London. Inaugurated in 2007, the Zabludowicz Collection's London project space presents exhibitions of collection works and new commissions by artists linked to the collection.

1500 Broadway houses a selection of works from the Zabludowicz Collection. The programme at 1500 consists of temporary exhibitions and events whilst the lobby is open to the public during office hours.

Across three locations on Sarvisalo, an island in Loviisa, Finland, the Zabludowicz Collection has initiated an international residency programme for invited artists. The residency programme offers an environment for the production of art.

In November 2015, it was announced that the Zabludowicz Collection will launch an artist residency programme in Las Vegas.

=== Reputation ===
Some art magazines and websites have listed Anita and Poju Zabludowicz in their annual rankings:

- Anita and Poju Zabludowicz appear in ArtReview's Power 100 lists for 2006 to 2014 which assess those most powerful in the art world. In 2014, they were listed at number 97.
- They appear in ARTnews's Top 200 Collectors lists for 2005–2019 which compile the world's most active art buyers.
- Larry's List, an online database of art collectors, which ranks collectors according to Internet presence, institutional engagement, art fair participation, communications platforms, and the physical visibility and scale of their collection, has ranked them 3rd in the world.
- They appear in ArtLyst's Alt Power 100 lists for 2011–2019 which compile art industry insiders who have made a major contribution to the discipline of contemporary art.
- They also appear in Artnet's The World's Top 100 Art Collectors lists for 2015–2016 and 100 Most Influential People in the Art World.
- Anita Zabludowicz appears in Christie's Top 100 Art World Instagrams.

== Personal life ==
Zabludowicz and her family reside mainly on The Bishops Avenue in Hampstead, a street in London referred to as Billionaire's Row, and have homes in Caesarea, Tel Aviv, and Sarvisalo, a small island in Finland. They purchased the house on The Bishops Avenue in 1989 and later purchased the adjacent house in 1997. The £60 million pair of "his and hers" mansions have an adjoining art gallery. They also own a 120-ft yacht.

In 2020, Zabludowicz was ranked the 19th richest woman in the United Kingdom.

The Sunday Times Rich List 2021 of the wealthiest people in the United Kingdom ranked Anita and Poju Zabludowicz 111th with a personal net worth of £1,500 million.

== Awards ==
- 2015: Zabludowicz received an OBE for her services to the arts.
