= Nicholas Wilcox Cundy =

English architect and engineer

Nicholas Wilcox Cundy (1778 – c. 1837) was an English architect and engineer. He was the son of Peter Cundy and Thomasine Wilcox and the brother of Thomas Cundy (senior). His parents' address was Restowick House, St Dennis, Cornwall.

== Career ==
Nicholas Cundy was articled to a civil engineer in 1793. Later, he moved to London and became articled to an architect. His best-known architectural work is the conversion of the Pantheon, London into a theatre 1811–1812.

He returned to civil engineering about 1823 and became involved with canals and railways. He made an unsuccessful bid to build a ship canal from Portsmouth to London. In the 1830s, he became involved with railway schemes, including the Grand Southern Railway (a proposed London-Brighton route), the Grand Northern Railway (later the Northern and Eastern Railway), and the Central Kent Railway.

He stood as a Member of Parliament for Sandwich, Kent but was not elected.

== Personal life ==
He married Miss Stafford-Cooke. He died about 1837.

== Bibliography ==
- Works of Nicholas Wilcox Cundy
