= Heath Hall =

Grade II listed house on The Bishop's Avenue in London

Coordinates: 51.5751°N 0.1707°W

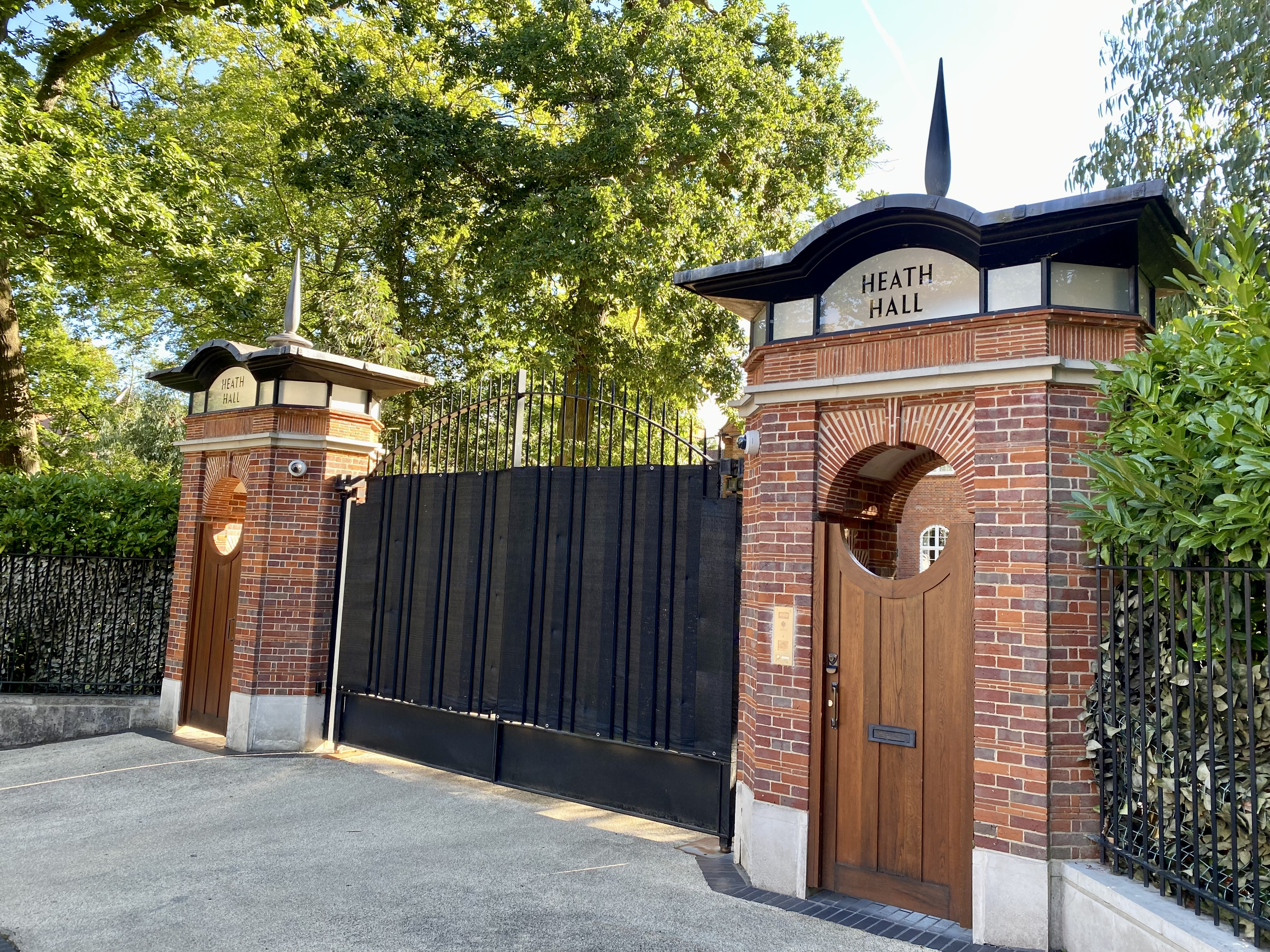
The entrance to Heath Hall in 2024

Heath Hall (formerly East Weald) is a Grade II listed large detached house at 59 The Bishop's Avenue in Barnet, North London. Built in 1910, Heath Hall remained a residential property until the postwar period. After various owners, it fell into dilapidation before being bought and renovated in recent years.

== Design ==
Heath Hall was built in 1910 as East Weald, the London residence of William Park Lyle, son of sugar magnate Abram Lyle. English Heritage's listing for East Weald described it as "...one of the best houses in The Bishop's Avenue, a notable area of opulent suburban development, and embodies the affluent domestic taste of the Edwardian period." Designed by Henry Victor Ashley and Winton Newman, their designs for East Weald were exhibited at the Royal Academy exhibitions of 1910 and 1911.

The house, built in an 'H' shape, is made from red brick with a green slate roof. The brick voussoirs within the "Romanesque-inspired arched hood" surrounding the front door of East Weald were particularly noted by English Heritage in their detailed description of the house. The architectural style of Heath Hall is influenced by the Arts and Crafts movement and references Scottish Baronial architecture. It is 27,000 sq ft in size, located in 2.5 acres of grounds. It has 14 en-suite bedrooms. Amenities include indoor and outdoor swimming pools, a home cinema, and an internal leisure complex with a gym, steam room and sauna. Heath Hall also possesses a wine cellar with storage for more than 600 bottles. Security features include a panic room.

== History ==
The Daily Telegraph visited Heath Hall in November 2011 with two elderly daughters of Louis Bolton, an underwriter at the insurance market Lloyd's, who had owned East Weald from 1923 to 1947. The women had lived at East Weald as children, and recalled that the present home cinema was a scullery during their time, and that the metal gates were commandeered during the Second World War.

East Weald was sold by their father after the war for the same price that he had paid for it in 1923. It was renamed Vernon House and used as a home for elderly blind people, operated by North London Homes for the Blind, in the 1950s and 1960s before its purchase by the Bank of China to house its London employees. English Heritage designated it a Grade II listed building in November 2001.

In 2006, it was bought by property developer Andreas Panayiotou for £5 million; his subsequent seven-year renovation cost an estimated £40 million. Panayiotou renamed the house Heath Hall, and his renovation expanded the size of the house by a third. Heath Hall was placed on sale for £100 million in 2012, with its asking price subsequently reduced by £35 million to £65 million in March 2013.

In 2015, it was acquired by Daniel Kretinsky, a Czech billionaire, who bought it for £25 million. To do so, he used a company registered in Jersey.

In October 2016, Justin Bieber rented the 15-bedroom North London estate for £108,000 a month, using it as his London home whilst performing in the UK.
