= Kite Pharma =

American biotechnology company

Kite Pharma, Inc.
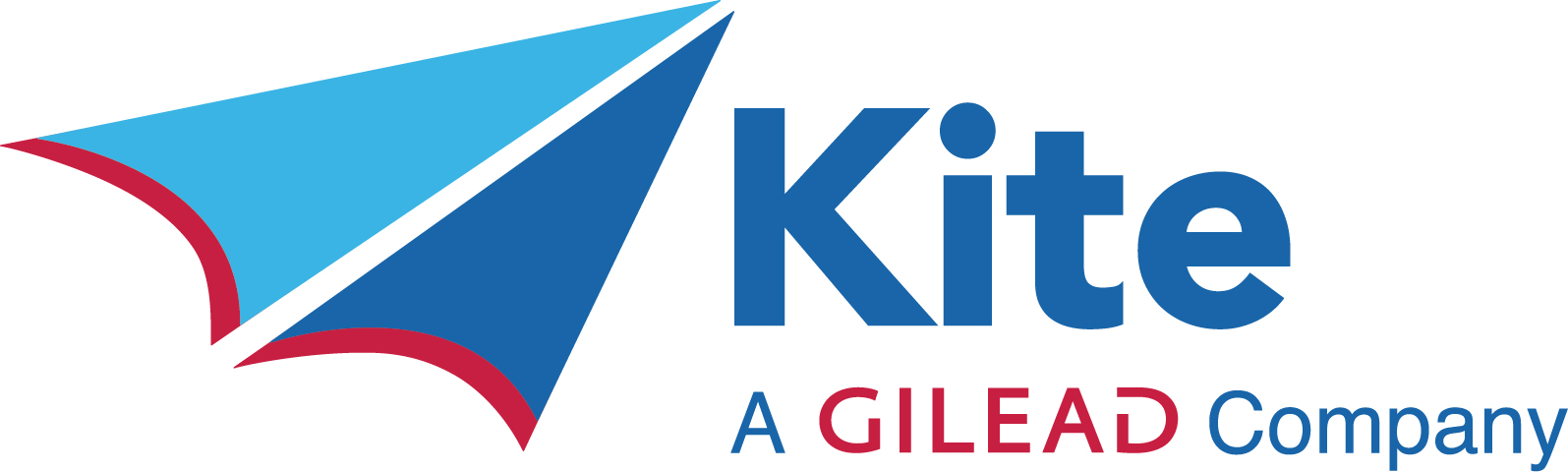
- Type: Subsidiary
- Traded as: Nasdaq: KITE
- Industry: Biopharmaceutical
- Founded: 2009; 17 years ago
- Founder: Arie Belldegrun and Joshua Kazam
- Fate: Acquired by Gilead Sciences
- Headquarters: Santa Monica, California
- Key people: Christi Shaw (CEO); Mert Aktar (Head of Corporate Development); Warner Biddle (Global Head of Commercial)
- Products: Cancer immunotherapy
- Number of employees: 2,000
- Parent: Gilead Sciences
- Website: www.kitepharma.com
- Footnotes; Key People, Founder

Kite Pharma, Inc. is an American biotechnology company that develops cancer immunotherapy products with a primary focus on genetically engineered autologous CAR T cell therapy - a cell-based therapy which relies on chimeric antigen receptors and T cells. Founded in 2009, and based in Santa Monica, California, it was acquired by Gilead Sciences in 2017.

== History ==
The company was founded in 2009 by Arie Belldegrun, an Israeli-American oncologist, who served as the company's chairman, president and chief executive officer. Belldegrun had a co-founder in Joshua Kazam, who took on the role of Director.

On August 28, 2017, Gilead Sciences announced that it would acquire Kite Pharma for $11.9 billion in an all-cash deal, a 29% premium on the share price. Gilead made the purchase in large part to bolster sales in the face of the company's declining hepatitis C franchise revenues, a result of declining patient numbers as they were cured, as Kite's sales were anticipated to reach $2 billion per annum. The acquisition was completed in October 2017, when Kite Pharma's Yescarta became the first CAR-T therapy approved by the FDA for the treatment of adult patients with relapsed or refractory large B-cell lymphoma after two or more lines of systemic therapy. This form of immunotherapy was originally developed by the U.S. National Cancer Institute and the company pays the government to support continuing research.

In 2017, MIT Technology Review ranked Kite Pharma 7th in its annual list of the preceding year's 50 Smartest Companies.

== Lead product ==
Axicabtagene ciloleucel (KTE-C19, ZUMA-3, YESCARTA) was an investigational therapy (for the treatment of adult patients with relapsed or refractory acute lymphoblastic leukemia (ALL)) in which a patient's T cells were genetically modified to express a chimeric antigen receptor designed to target the antigen CD19, a protein expressed on the cell surface of B-cell lymphomas and leukemias. It garnered a US FDA Breakthrough Therapy Designation (Dec 2015) for the treatment of patients with refractory diffuse large B cell lymphoma (DLBCL), primary mediastinal B cell lymphoma (PMBCL), and transformed follicular lymphoma (TFL). It was approved for use in the United States under the brand name YESCARTA in October 2017.

== Development history ==
=== 2012 ===
In October, Kite Pharma entered into a Cooperative Research and Development Agreement with the National Cancer Institute (NCI) for the development and commercialization of products for the treatment of multiple cancer indications.

=== 2013 ===
In December, the company announced data in its lead clinical development program with the NCI, demonstrating that Kite's most advanced immunotherapy product candidate – KTE-C19 CAR – can produce robust and durable tumor shrinkage in patients with an aggressive form of non-Hodgkin's lymphoma, known as diffuse large B cell lymphoma (DLBCL). The clinical data were presented at the 55th American Society of Hematology Annual Meeting.

=== 2014 ===
The company announced in March, that the U.S. Food and Drug Administration (FDA) Office of Orphan Products Development granted orphan drug designation for the company's proposed therapy for DLBCL.

In June, Kite Pharma entered into an exclusive, worldwide license with the National Institutes of Health (NIH) to certain intellectual property related to TCR-based product candidates that target the NY-ESO-1 antigen for the treatment of cancers expressing NY-ESO-1.

Kite Pharma announced findings from its ongoing clinical trial in August: 12 of 13 evaluable patients with advanced B-cell malignancies had complete remissions (8 patients) or partial remissions (4 patients) resulting in a 92% objective response rate. The results support Kite Pharma's plan to file an Investigational New Drug (IND) application in the fourth quarter of 2014 to initiate a clinical trial of Kite Pharma's lead CAR-based product candidate, KTE-C19, in patients with DLBCL.

=== 2015 ===
In January, Kite Pharma and Amgen entered into a strategic research collaboration and license agreement to develop and commercialize the next generation of novel Chimeric Antigen Receptor (CAR) T cell immunotherapies based on Kite's engineered autologous cell therapy platform and Amgen's extensive array of cancer targets.

Kite Pharma announced in May, that the first patient in its Phase 1/2 clinical trial of KTE-C19 in patients with refractory aggressive Non-Hodgkin Lymphoma has been treated.

In June, Kite Pharma and bluebird bio, Inc. announced they have entered into a collaboration agreement to co-develop and co-commercialize second generation T cell receptor product candidates directed against the human papillomavirus type 16 E6 onco protein incorporating gene editing and lentiviral technologies.

In July, Kite Pharma and the Leukemia & Lymphoma Society announced that they have entered into a partnership to enhance the development of Kite's lead product candidate, KTE-C19, for the treatment of patients with refractory aggressive Non-Hodgkin Lymphoma.

In September, Kite Pharma announced that it has expanded its collaboration with the Netherlands Cancer Institute (NKI). Kite and the NKI have entered into an agreement under which Kite will receive from the NKI the exclusive option to license multiple T cell receptor (TCR) gene sequences for the development and commercialization of cancer immunotherapy candidates targeting solid tumors. Kite has also expanded its access to additional resources and research facilities through a master services agreement with the NKI.

In October, Kite Pharma announced that it has entered into an exclusive, worldwide license with the National Institutes of Health (NIH) for intellectual property related to T cell receptor (TCR)-based product candidates directed against MAGE A3 and A3/A6 antigens for the treatment of tumors expressing MAGE, which include lung, pancreatic, gastric, and breast cancers, among others. In the same month, Kite Pharma announced that it has entered into a worldwide research and license agreement with Alpine Immune Sciences (AIS), a privately held biotechnology startup, to discover and develop protein-based immunotherapies targeting the immune synapse to treat cancer. AIS will grant Kite an exclusive license to two programs from its Transmembrane immunomodulatory protein (TIP) technology, which Kite plans to further engineer into chimeric antigen receptor (CAR) and T cell receptor (TCR) product candidates. This collaboration will accelerate Kite's efforts to establish the next generation of engineered T cell therapies specifically designed to overcome the inhibitory mechanisms present in the tumor micro-environment.

In December, Kite Pharma announced that it has initiated a phase 1/2 clinical study of KTE-C19 (ZUMA-3) for the treatment of adult patients with relapsed/refractory acute lymphoblastic leukemia (ALL). KTE-C19 is an investigational therapy in which a patient's T cells are genetically modified to express a chimeric antigen receptor designed to target the antigen CD19, a protein expressed on the cell surface of B-cell lymphomas and leukemia's. In the same month, Kite Pharma and GE Global Research announced they will partner to develop a next-generation, functionally integrated and automated manufacturing system for engineered T-cell therapy. Kite and GE Global Research—GE's centralized R&D hub—said they aim to increase the availability of engineered T-cell therapies by speeding up development of automation technologies that have the potential to lower costs, operate faster, and minimize variability. Also in December, Kite announced that the U.S. Food and Drug Administration (FDA) has granted Breakthrough Therapy Designation status to the company's lead product candidate, KTE-C19, for the treatment of patients with refractory diffuse large B cell lymphoma (DLBCL), primary mediastinal B cell lymphoma (PMBCL), and transformed follicular lymphoma (TFL).

=== 2016 ===
In January, it was announced that Kite Pharma has entered into a Cooperative Research and Development Agreement (CRADA) with the NCI for the research and clinical development of a fully human anti-CD19 chimeric antigen receptor (CAR) product candidate for the treatment of B-cell lymphomas and leukemia. Moreover, Kite Pharma announced that its European subsidiary has entered into a research and license agreement with Leiden University Medical Center (LUMC) to identify and develop T cell receptor (TCR) product candidates targeting solid tumors that are associated with the human papillomavirus (HPV) type 16 infection.

In March, Kite Pharma has announced that it would be collaborating with Genentech, in order to evaluate the safety and efficacy of two of its novel therapies. The target population for the tests would be patients with non-Hodgkin Lymphoma. The therapies in question, KTE-C19 and atezolizumab, would be tested in combination with each other.

In June, Kite Pharma and Cell Design Labs, Inc. announced a research collaboration and license agreement to develop next generation, precision-controlled chimeric antigen receptor (CAR) product candidates that incorporate Cell Design Labs' molecular “on/off switch” technology. Also in June, Kite Pharma announced that it has entered into a new Cooperative Research and Development Agreement (CRADA) with the Experimental Transplantation and Immunology Branch (ETIB) of the National Cancer Institute (NCI) for the research and clinical development of T-cell receptor (TCR) product candidates directed against human papillomavirus (HPV)-16 E6 and E7 onco-proteins for the treatment of HPV-associated cancers.

In July, Kite Pharma announced that it has entered into an exclusive, worldwide license agreement with The Regents of the University of California, on behalf of the University of California, Los Angeles (UCLA), for technology to advance the development of off-the-shelf allogeneic T-cell therapies from renewable pluripotent stem cells.

In December, Kite Pharma and Vitruvian Networks, Inc., a pioneering cell and gene therapy software and analytics platform company co-founded by GE Ventures and the Mayo Clinic, announced a strategic partnership to create a software solution to support commercial availability of T-cell therapies. Together, the parties will design and develop a platform for patients, physicians and treatment centers that enables commercial-scale ordering, logistics, monitoring and delivery of autologous cell therapies if they are FDA-approved, including axicabtagene ciloleucel (formerly known as KTE-C19), Kite's lead investigational engineered T-cell therapy for aggressive non-Hodgkin lymphoma.

=== 2017 ===
In March, Kite announced results a clinical trial of CAR-T cells in around a hundred people with advanced Non-Hodgkin lymphoma.

In April, Kite has won the ‘Clinical Trial Result of the Year’ award for its CAR-T trial of Axicabtagene Ciloleucel in patients with Aggressive Non-Hodgkin Lymphoma at the Clinical and Research Excellence Awards. The award recognizes clinical achievements in the pharmaceutical industry and contribution to the advancement of therapies for unmet medical needs.

In August, Kite has filed the first CAR-T candidate in Europe, seeking approval of its axicabtagene ciloleucel (KTE-C19) for two types of non-Hodgkin's lymphoma (NHL).

== Business history ==
In March 2011, Kite Pharma received $15 million in Series A venture cash.

In May 2013, Kite Pharma completed a $35 million financing of Series A preferred stock.

In April 2014, Kite Pharma completed a $50 million mezzanine private financing of convertible notes.

In May 2014, Kite Pharma filed a registration with the SEC for an initial public offering (IPO) of its common stock.

In June 2014, Kite Pharma sold 8,625,000 shares of its common stock in their IPO at $17.00 per share, for gross proceeds of $146.6 million. The company listed on the NASDAQ Global market under the symbol “KITE.”

In December 2014, Kite Pharma sold 4,007,750 shares of it common stock in their follow-on offering at $54.00 per share, for gross proceeds of $216.4 million.

In March 2015, Kite Pharma acquired T-Cell Factory (TCF), a privately held biotechnology company based in the Netherlands, for €20 million and renamed it – Kite Pharma EU. Per the deal, Kite Pharma has obtained license agreements with IBA GmbH, Sanquin Blood Supply Foundation and the Netherlands Cancer Institute (NKI), which include the rights to select new intellectual property related to T-cell receptors (TCRs) developed at the NKI. Additionally, the TCF acquisition will allow Kite Pharma to access the European manufacturing facilities, paving way for the company to initiate development programs in the EU and build its presence in the region.

In December 2015, Kite Pharma sold 4,168,750 shares of its common stock in a public offering at $69.00 per share, for gross proceeds of $287.6 million.

In January 2017, Kite Pharma announced that it has partnered with Daiichi Sankyo Co Ltd to develop and commercialize its cancer treatment therapy in Japan, putting the U.S. company in line to receive up to $250 million in payments, of the $250 million, Kite said it would receive $50 million as upfront payment. Also in January, Kite Pharma announced that it had formed a joint venture with Fosun Pharmaceutical to develop and commercialize its cancer treatment in China. Kite Pharma said it would receive an upfront payment of $40 million from the joint venture, funded by Fosun Pharma as well as regulatory and commercial milestones totaling $35 million.

On August 28, 2017, Gilead Sciences announced that it would purchase Kite Pharma for US$11.9 billion in cash ($180.00 per share). The purchase was subsequently completed for the announced price on October 3, 2017.

The company has primary leading manufacturing facilities in El Segundo, CA next to Los Angeles International airport and Amsterdam, Netherlands to support US, Canada, Australia and European markets. Kite is in the process of coordinating additional manufacturing capacity from its recent expansion into Urbana, Maryland facility as of 2023 as a strategic center that could accommodate same-day service to both California and Netherlands manufacturing operations.

In February 2023, the business completed its acquisition of Tmunity Therapeutics

In September 2024, Kite Pharma announced it would sell its 50% stake in the joint venture to Fosun Pharmaceutical for $27 million.

== Allogene Therapeutics ==
Following the sale of Kite to Gilead, Kite's founders and its CMO struck a deal in February 2018 with Pfizer to develop CAR-T therapeutics, leading to the creation of Allogene Therapeutics. The three former Kite executives subsequently hired into Allogene a number of people who left Kite after its sale. The notion behind Allogene was to create a 'next generation CAR-T' which was not tailored to a single individual, as YESCARTA was, but rather could be used in multiple patients, an allogeneic CAR-T. Pfizer received a 25% stake in Allogene and two seats on the company's board, while Allogene received rights to sixteen pre-clinical CAR-T assets and one Phase 1 allogeneic CAR-T clinical asset. Allogene's Series A funding was US$300 million, including Texas Pacific Group, University of California, Two River—and even Gilead as participants, among others. In October 2019, Allogene's initial public offering netted US$324 million and a capital valuation of US$3 billion.

== See also ==
- Iovance Biotherapeutics
