= Ability Group =

British real estate company

- Type: Private
- Industry: Property
- Founded: 1996; 30 years ago
- Founder: Andreas Panayiotou
- Headquarters: Brentford, Middlesex
- Website: www.theabilitygroup.com

Ability Group is a British property company based in Brentford founded in 1996 by hotelier and property tycoon Andreas Panayiotou.

Ability Group had 7,000 residential properties, worth over £1 billion, before moving into hotels and commercial property.

Ability Group owns Dunblane Hydro, Hilton Liverpool, Hilton Cambridge, Waldorf-Astoria Syon Park, DoubleTree Aberdeen.

The hotel in Aberdeen had a £7 million renovation by The Ability Group.

== History ==
Ability Group was founded by Andreas Panayiotou. By 2007, the group had built up around £1 billion in UK residential assets and had begun expanding into commercial property and hotels.

== Hotels ==
In 2007, Ability Group acquired the Hilton hotel at Liverpool One for £60 million. The hotel was part of the Liverpool One development and was expected to open in 2009.

The group has owned hotels including Premier Inn Glasgow, DoubleTree by Hilton Cambridge, Hilton Dunblane Hydro, Liverpool Hilton and Hilton London Syon Park.

London Syon Park was originally developed by Ability Group at a reported cost of £70 million and operated by Hilton Worldwide. It opened as a Waldorf Astoria property before being rebranded as Hilton London Syon Park in 2013.
