= Joseph Rose (plasterer) =

English plasterer (1745–1799)

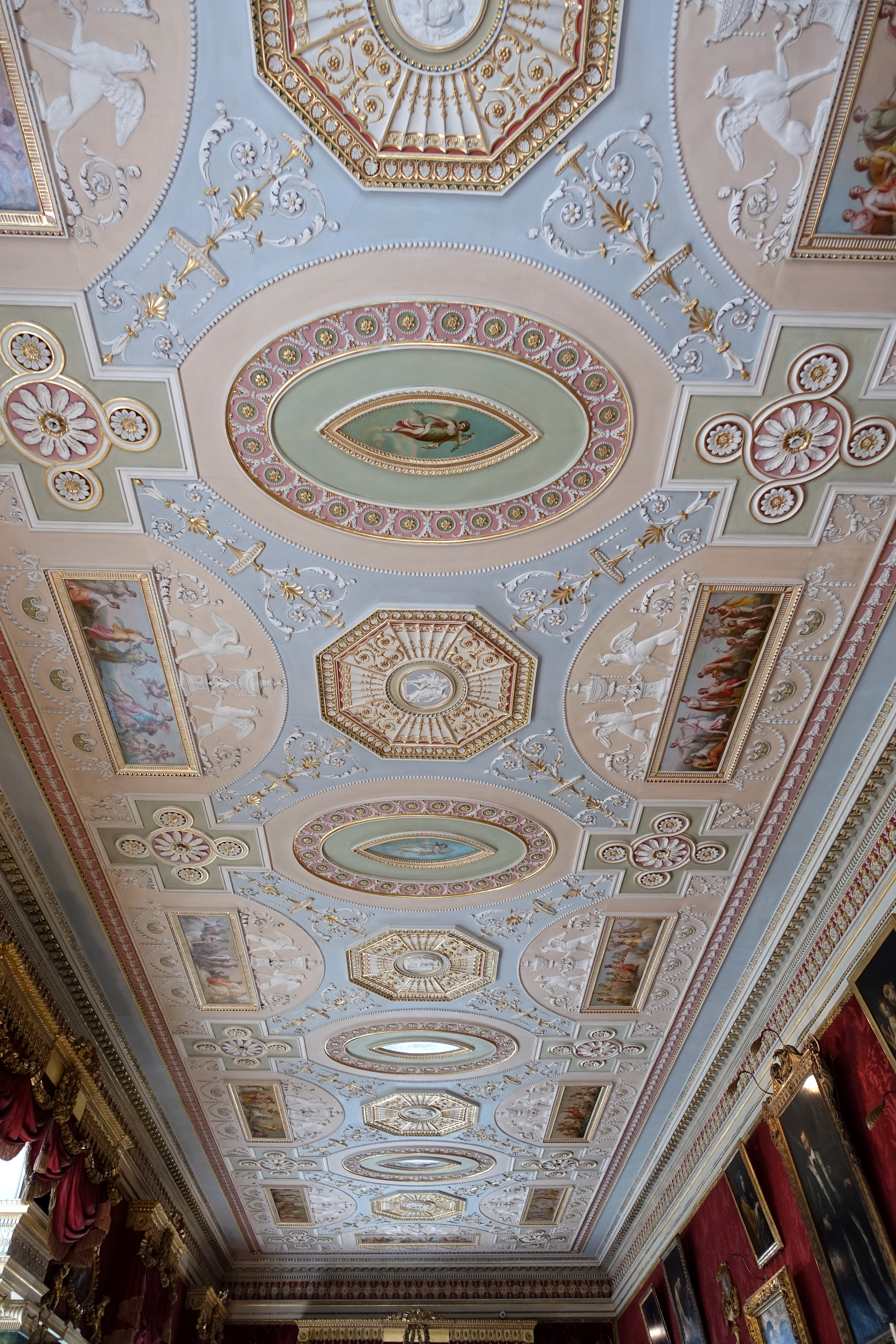
Gallery ceiling, Harewood House

Joseph Rose Jr. (5 April 1745 – 11 February 1799) was a celebrated plasterer (stuccoist) who worked closely with Robert Adam to create some of the finest decorative plasterwork in Great Britain.

== Biography ==
Rose was born in Norton, Derbyshire, a nephew to Joseph Rose Sr. (c. 1723 – 11 September 1780), who was himself a noted plasterer in the Roccoco style with works including Doncaster Mansion House, Nostell Priory, Felbrigg Hall, and the drawing room at Heath Hall in Yorkshire. The elder Rose worked primarily for Robert Adam from 1760 onward; the younger learned from his uncle and from a visit to Rome in 1768.

Rose worked for the family firm of Joseph Rose & Co., was appointed Master of the Worshipful Company of Plasterers in 1775, and succeeded his uncle as head of the firm upon his uncle's death in 1780. While some of the plaster work was performed on location, many of the more complex designs were created at his workshop in Queen Anne Street East, London, which included a wax room and casting room, as well as a mould room in which he kept wax moulds and plaster casts.

Rose's work was primarily in the Neoclassical style for Robert Adam, and include ceiling work at Sledmere House and major commissions at Audley End, Bowood, Castle Coole, Chatsworth House, Croome Court, Harewood House, Kedleston Hall, and Kenwood House.

== Bibliography ==
- Riding, Jacquelinea (1997). "Rose Family, British Stuccoists". In Banham, Joanna (ed.). Encyclopedia of Interior Design. Routledge. pp. 1086–1087. ISBN 978-1-136-78758-4.
- Beard, Geoffrey; Orton, Jeff; Ireland, Richard (2015). Decorative Plasterwork in Great Britain. Routledge. pp. 238–243. ISBN 978-1-317-74288-3.
- "Joseph Rose biography" (PDF). National Trust.
