= Shlomo Zabludowicz =

Polish-born Israeli businessman (1914–1994)

- 'שלמה זבלודוביץ
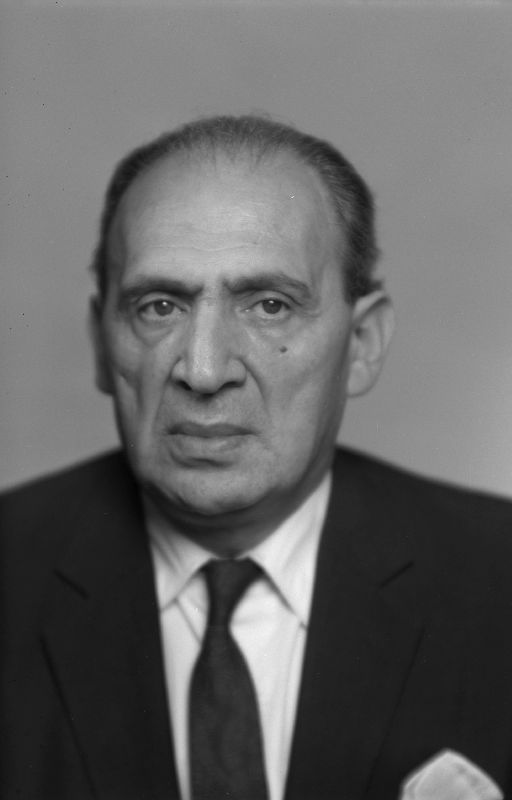
- Zabludowicz in 1969
- Born: 1914; Łódź, Poland
- Died: 1994 (aged 79–80)
- Occupation: Businessman
- Known for: Founder of Tamares; key figure in the creation of Soltam Systems
- Spouse: Pola Zabludowicz
- Children: Poju Zabludowicz; Rebecka Belldegrun

Shlomo Zabludowicz (Hebrew: שלמה זבלודוביץ'; 1914–1994) was a Polish-born Israeli businessman. He gained wealth through the armament trade between the Finnish weapons manufacturer Tampella and Israel.

== Biography ==
Shlomo Zabludowicz was born in a Jewish family in Łódź, Poland. His father was a rabbi. Zabludowicz and his family was interned at the Auschwitz concentration camp, where only he and his wife Pola survived. After the war, he immigrated to Finland via Sweden. In Finland, he had two children, business magnate Poju Zabludowicz and ophthalmologist Rebecka Belldegrun. In 1975, he immigrated to Israel.

== Business career ==
Zabludowicz founded the investment firm Tamares that is currently owned by his son Poju. Zabludowicz was a prominent figure in creating the joint enterprise between Tampella and Solel Boneh, Soltam Systems. In the 1980s, he began moving his investments to property.
