= Sasan, Una =

Sasan
- village
- Interactive map of Sasan
- Country: India
- State: Himachal Pradesh
- District: Una district
- Tehsils: Una

Government
  - Body: Village Panchayat

Languages
- Time zone: UTC+5:30 (IST)
- PIN: 018814
- Vehicle registration: HP-
- Civic agency: Village Panchayat

Sasan is a village located at Una Tehsil of Una district in the state of Himachal Pradesh, India. The village is one of the populous villages of Himachal Pradesh.

== Demographics ==
The village has a population of 1314 people, of which 661 are males and 653 are females as per 2011 Indian Census.
