= Sassan Sanei =

Canadian engineer (born 1973)

Sassan Sanei (born January 7, 1973) is a Canadian engineer.

== Biography ==
An intense fascination with mathematics, physics, and computing from an early age led him eventually to attend the University of Waterloo, where he received the Bachelor of Applied Science degree with first-class honours in Electrical Engineering and the Bachelor of Arts degree in philosophy. He was also recipient of the Faculty of Engineering Entrance Scholarship and the Sandford Fleming Work Term Award. Prior to university, he attended the Toronto French School.

Since 1996, he has been employed by Research In Motion (RIM) in engineering and business capacities related to radio modems and BlackBerry devices.

He was an early proponent of the implementation of Java ME as a standard platform for Wireless devices, which is in widespread use today.

He has emphasized that making efficient use of the available wireless capacity, allocating it across a large number of users, is more important to the overall user experience than implementing a small number of high-bandwidth applications. His notable contributions to the design and development of the BlackBerry have helped to make the devices so ubiquitous and addictive as to earn the nickname "CrackBerry."

He is also known within the wireless industry as the publisher of the BlackBerry Developer Journal, a technical magazine widely read by developers of wireless applications. He has also spoken extensively at industry conferences and other events related to wireless technology, software development, security, and hardware design.
