= Hourieh Peramaa =

Kazakhstani businessman

- Born: 1929 (age 96–97); Kazakhstan
- Known for: Property investment
- Children: 6, including Sasan Ghandehari

Hourieh Peramaa (Persian: حوریه پراما, also known as Hourieh Peramam or Horelma), is a Kazakh-born billionaire property investor.

== Early life ==
Peramaa was born in August 1930. Her family were forced to seek refuge in Iran when the Kulaks were subject of repression and execution by the USSR government.

== Wealth ==
In 2008, it was reported that her investment portfolio of commercial real estate was worth more than £5 billion spanning across Europe and North America. In the same year, she again made headlines by purchasing the most expensive new built house in London.

== Personal life ==
Peramaa, once a penniless refugee, fled her native Kazakhstan aged 17 and was forced to live in an Iranian refugee camp. There she met her future husband, a medical student from a wealthy Iranian family.

She has an affinity for fine wines and thoroughbred horses. Peramaa divides her time between her estates in North America, Europe and Morocco. She has five daughters and a son, the Iranian-born British billionaire venture capitalist Sasan Ghandehari.

== Panama Papers ==
In 2015, her name was mentioned in the leaked Panama Papers connecting her to Tiquen Investments, a conglomerate investment holding incorporated in 2003.
