= Poju Zabludowicz =

Finnish businessman and art collector

- Born: Chaim Zabludowicz; 6 April 1953 (age 73); Helsinki, Finland
- Citizenship: Finland; United Kingdom; Israel
- Education: Tel Aviv University
- Occupations: Chairman and CEO, Tamares Group
- Years active: 1990–present
- Known for: Art collection, philanthropy
- Spouse: Anita Zabludowicz
- Children: 4
- Parent(s): Pola and Shlomo Zabludowicz
- Relatives: Rebecka Belldegrun (sister); Arie Belldegrun (brother-in-law)

Chaim "Poju" Zabludowicz (born 6 April 1953) is a Finnish-British-Israeli billionaire businessman, art collector and philanthropist.

== Early life and education ==
Chaim ("Poju") Zabludowicz was born in Helsinki, Finland, the son of arms industry businessman Shlomo Zabludowicz, who built the family business around Soltam, an Israeli defence contractor.

He was raised in Tampere, where he attended Svenska Samskolan i Tammerfors, the Swedish-speaking school in the city. He graduated with a degree in Economics and Political Science from Tel Aviv University.

== Personal and family life ==
He is married to UK-born Anita Zabludowicz, who, in 2015, was appointed an OBE for her services to the arts.

Zabludowicz and his family reside mainly on The Bishops Avenue in Hampstead, a street in London referred to as Billionaire's Row, and have homes in Caesarea, Tel Aviv, and Sarvisalo, a small island in Finland. They purchased the house on The Bishops Avenue in 1989, and later purchased the adjacent house in 1997. The £60 million pair of "his and hers" mansions have an adjoining art gallery. They also own a 120-ft yacht. In January 2017, it was revealed that Zabludowicz purchased a ₪25 million home in Neve Tzedek, a neighborhood of Tel Aviv. This purchase was listed as the 11th most expensive real estate deal in Israel in 2016.

In 2008, Zabludowicz was listed at number 30 in The Jewish Chronicle Top 100, a "list of those who wield the greatest influence on British Jewry." In 2014, he was listed at number 75.

In 2015, in its annual ranking of the wealthiest people in Israel, Forbes Israel ranked Zabludowicz 13th with a personal net worth of ₪8.7 billion. He was also ranked 37th on The Estates Gazette Rich List, a comprehensive guide to the wealth of those involved in the UK's property market, compiled by the authors of The Sunday Times Rich List.

In 2017, Poju and Anita Zabludowicz were ranked the 9th richest couple in Britain.

The Sunday Times Rich List 2021 of the wealthiest people in the United Kingdom ranked Poju and Anita Zabludowicz 111th with a personal net worth of £1,500 million.

== Business career ==
After graduation, Zabludowicz worked at BFG Bank AG in Frankfurt.

In 1978, Zabludowicz was appointed a director of Tamares, the family's holding company, and has headed the company since 1990. Tamares invests in a number of different private and public companies, and in real estate properties. The company owns 40% of the land in downtown Las Vegas. Today, Tamares Group holds a $3 billion portfolio. Its real estate holdings encompass 2.3 million square feet of office space.

In 1993, Zabludowicz set up Ivory Gate, a property investment company based in London. Using offshore vehicles, Ivory Gate made investments in UK commercial property.

In 2006, Zabludowicz established and was the chairman of the advisory board of Auctor Capital Partners, a corporate finance and advisory house for hedge funds. He has been the chairman of the advisory board of Synova Capital from 2007 to 2014, a private equity fund specialising in investments in UK growth companies, and Chairman of Tamares Telecom since 2011, a privately held service provider that operates and markets communications services based on a new internationally deployed fibre-optic network.

Zabludowicz was a director of Mustavaaran Kaivos, a company that owns the mineral rights to the Mustavaara vanadium/iron/titanium deposit in northeastern Finland, and has been a director and member of the Human Capital Committee of Outotec from March 2012 until March 2017, a company that provides technologies and services for the metal and mineral processing industries. Zabludowicz has also served as a member on a number of boards, including the European Advisory Board of Citigroup, the board of directors of GEMS (an Asia Pacific private equity fund), and Stratos Ventures (an early-stage venture capital firm with a focus on information and communication technology sectors).

Zabludowicz is the owner of the Finnish ice hockey team Tappara.

In June 2016, it was announced that ARTA, a fine art shipping startup based in New York, has raised $1 million in capital from a group of institutional and strategic investors, among them Poju and Anita Zabludowicz.

== Activism ==
=== Judaism and Zionist advocacy ===
Zabludowicz is the founder and former chairman of BICOM, the Britain Israel Communications and Research Centre, an organisation founded in 2001 which lobbies the UK government on behalf of Israel. He is reported to have given the lobby group more than £2 million in three years. He is a benefactor of the UJIA (United Jewish Israel Appeal), and was a member of the advisory boards of CST (Community Security Trust) and UJIA, and a trustee of Jewish Leadership Council.

=== Political activism ===
Zabludowicz has given donations to David Cameron's leadership campaign and to the Conservative Party. According to Electoral Commission records, the Tamares Group provided £15,000 for Cameron's leadership campaign in 2005 and has donated £55,000 to Conservative funds in 2006 and 2007, and £131,805 in 2010. To date, Zabludowicz has donated a total of £380,000 to the Conservative Party.

Backing an election campaign for seats in the European Parliament, he donated €8,000 to Alexander Stubb in 2014.

According to The Jewish Chronicle, Zabludowicz hosted secret talks at his London home in March 2011 between Israeli President Shimon Peres and Palestinian President Mahmoud Abbas.

=== Philanthropy ===
The Zabludowicz Center for Autoimmune Diseases opened in Sheba Medical Center through Poju and Anita Zabludowicz's donations. The center centralises under one roof all aspects of autoimmune research and treatment, and brings together physicians and researchers from multidisciplinary fields such as internal medicine, clinical immunology, autoimmunity, rheumatology, ophthalmology, neurology, obstetrics and gynaecology.

The Zabludowicz family sponsors exhibitions, art fairs and fundraising events. In 2014, they donated funds for the planned Helsinki Guggenheim.

Zabludowicz donated between $100,000–250,000 to the Clinton Foundation.

Zabludowicz has been a patron of the Finnish British Chamber of Commerce since 2011.

== Art collection ==
Since the 1990s, the Zabludowiczs have been accumulating a 500-artist, 5,000-piece collection of artwork. They exhibited their private art collection at three different locations, including 176, a gallery in a former 19th-centurary Methodist chapel in Chalk Farm, north London. The London project space operated at 176 Price of Wales Road from 2007 until 2023, presenting exhibitions of works from the collection and new commissions by artists linked to it. Since 2025, the building has been occupied by Camden Arts Projects. One sculpture in the collection, a miniature statue of Jesus with an erection, surrounded by 50 other sculptures also with erections, has been considered "grotesquely offensive" by some Christians, one of whom has said she will bring a private prosecution against the Baltic Centre for Contemporary Art in Gateshead, which has exhibited the statue.

The skyscraper at 1500 Broadway at Times Square in New York City houses a selection of works from the Zabludowicz Collection. The programme at the New York City venue consists of changing exhibitions and other events while the lobby is publicly open during daytime.

Across three locations on Sarvisalo, an island in Loviisa, Finland, the Zabludowicz Collection has initiated an international residency programme for invited artists. The residency programme offers an environment for the production of art.

In November 2015, it was announced that the Zabludowicz Collection will launch an artist residency programme in Las Vegas.

=== Rankings ===
Some art magazines and websites have listed Poju and Anita Zabludowicz in their annual rankings:

- Poju and Anita Zabludowicz appear in ArtReview's Power 100 lists for 2006 to 2014 which assess those most powerful in the art world. In 2014, they were listed at number 97.
- They appear in ARTnews's Top 200 Collectors lists for 2005–2019 which compile the world's most active art buyers.
- Larry's List, an online database of art collectors, which ranks collectors according to Internet presence, institutional engagement, art fair participation, communications platforms, and the physical visibility and scale of their collection, has ranked them 3rd in the world.
- They appear in ArtLyst's Alt Power 100 lists for 2011–2019 which compile art industry insiders who have made a major contribution to the discipline of contemporary art.
- They also appear in Artnet's The World's Top 100 Art Collectors lists for 2015–2016 and 100 Most Influential People in the Art World.
- Anita Zabludowicz appears in Christie's Top 100 Art World Instagrams.

Zabludowicz has served as the Founder and Trustee of the Zabludowicz Collection since 1994, Council Member of Tate Modern International (since 1999), Member of the board of Kiasma (since 2009), Founding Patron of Camden Arts Centre, and co-chairman of British Friends of the Art Museums of Israel (BFAMI).

== Controversy ==
Zabludowicz was called to the High Court in November 2013 as witness in Scot Young's divorce case.

Since 2014, the group Boycott Divest Zabludowicz (BDZ) has been calling on artists and institutions alike to boycott the Zabludowicz Collection. The group accuses Poju Zabludowicz and his wife Anita of "laundering some very dirty money" through their Foundation. "As the public-relations front end for historically one of the largest suppliers of arms to the Israeli state and Chairman of the UK based Pro-Israeli Lobby group Bicom," the statement reads, "the Zabludowicz Foundation represents a direct link between the opportunities for careers in art for young people here in London and the current bombing and ongoing genocidal oppression of Palestinians in the Occupied Territories."

In February 2017, it was reported that as part of a corruption investigation against Prime Minister Benjamin Netanyahu, Israel Police were investigating whether he had received gifts or other benefits from Zabludowicz. Following that investigation no further action was taken against Zabludowicz.

In 2021, in light of Israel’s recent attacks on Al Aqsa Mosque in Jerusalem as well as the continued expulsions of Palestinian people from Sheikh Jarrah in East Jerusalem, BDZ again called for a boycott of the Zabludowicz Art Trust in solidarity with Palestine. In response, Anita and Poju Zabludowicz released a statement acknowledging "the innocent lives lost on both sides" but failed to respond to the accusations, or commit to adjusting for them.
