= East Finchley =

Area of north London, England

Coordinates: 51.59016°N 0.17534°W

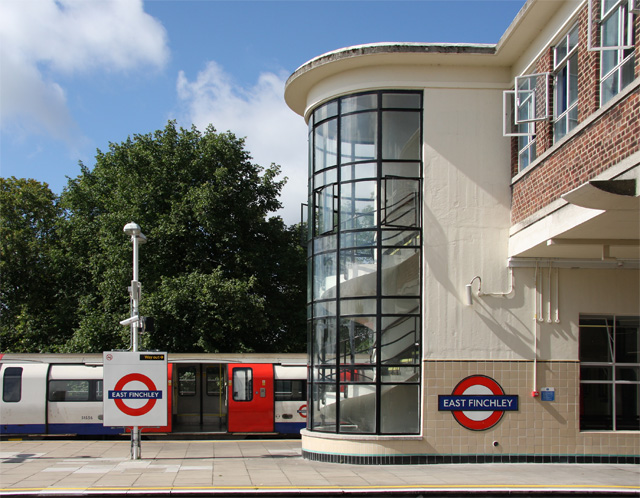
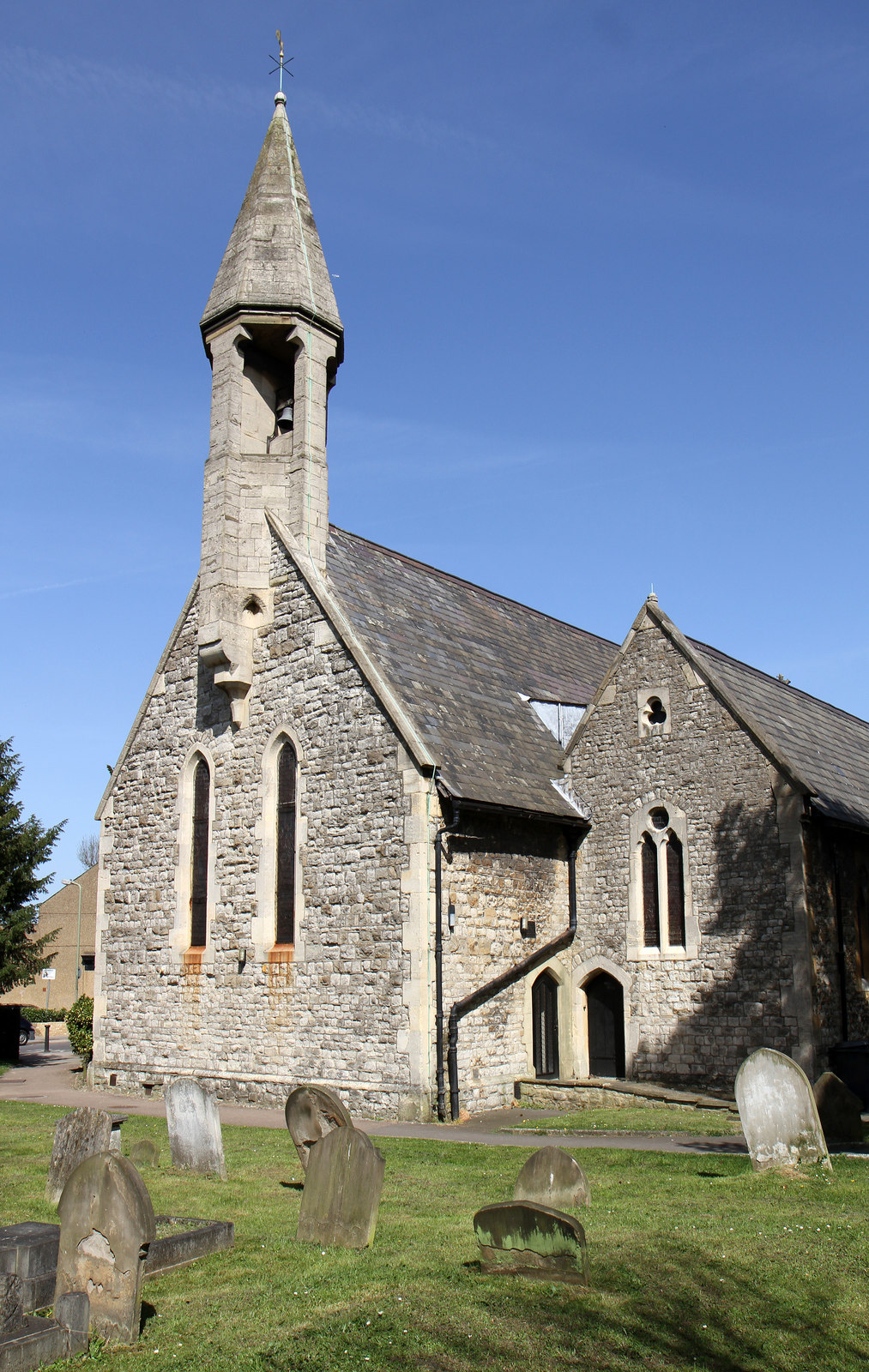
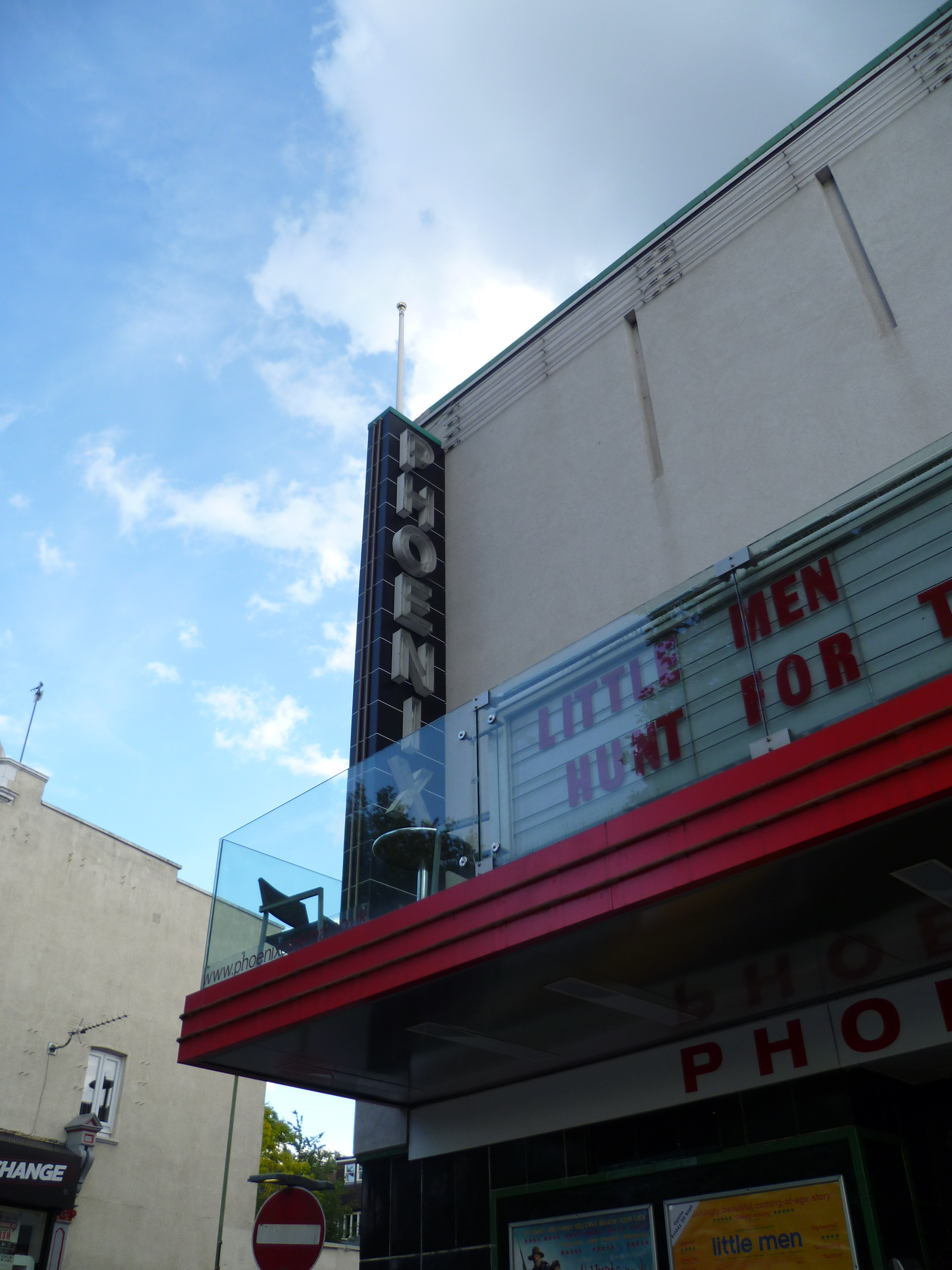
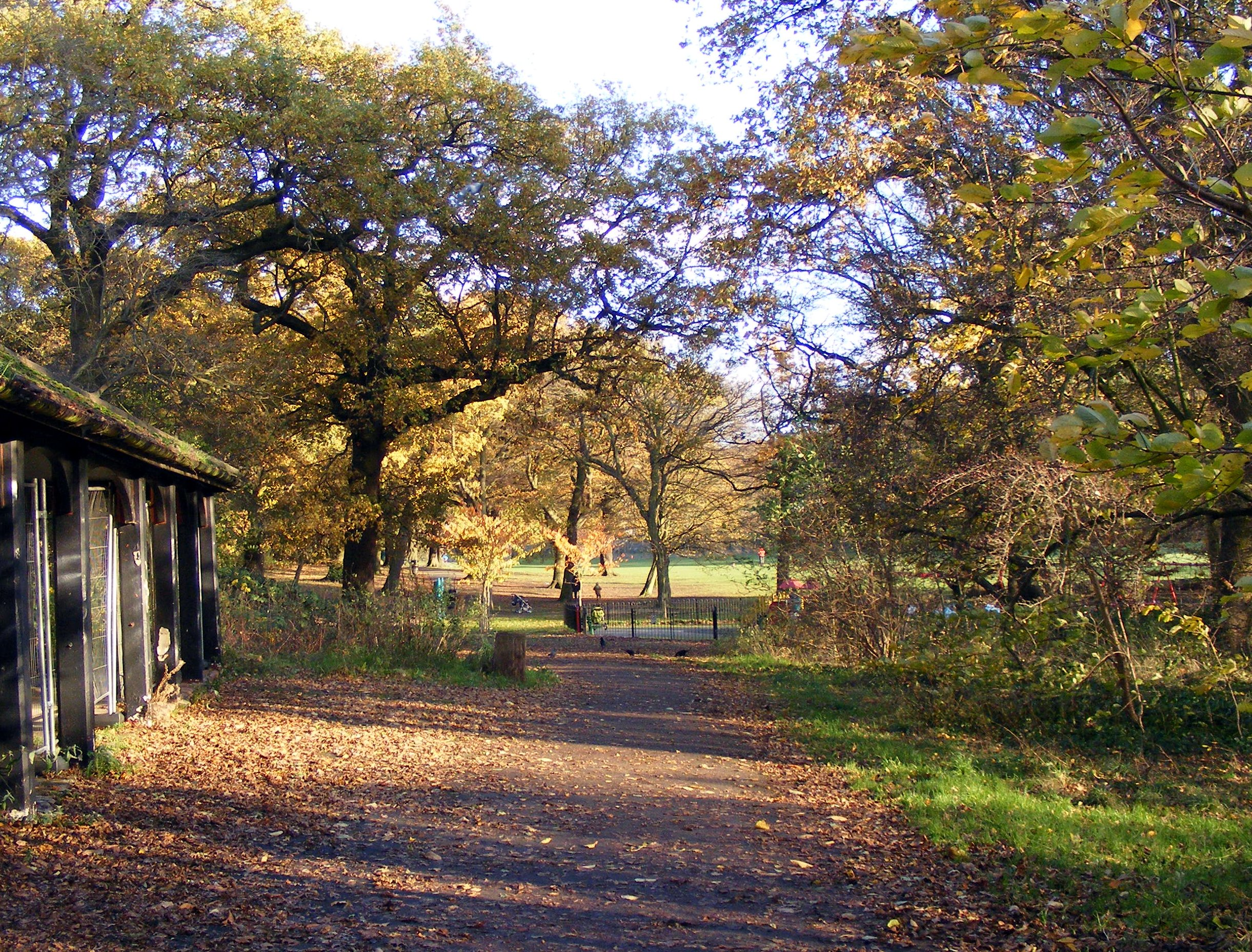
- Clockwise from top: The underground station, Phoenix Cinema, Cherry Tree Woods and Holy Trinity Church

- Location within Greater London
- Population: 15,989 (2011 Census.Ward)
- OS grid reference: TQ265895
  - Charing Cross: 5.75 mi (9.3 km)
- London borough: Barnet
- Ceremonial county: Greater London
- Region: London
- Country: England
- Sovereign state: United Kingdom
- Post town: LONDON
- Postcode district: N2
- Dialling code: 020
- Police: Metropolitan
- Fire: London
- Ambulance: London
- UK Parliament: Finchley & Golders Green
- London Assembly: Barnet and Camden

East Finchley is an area of north London, in Greater London, England. It lies immediately north of Hampstead Heath; like neighbouring Muswell Hill, it straddles the London Boroughs of Barnet and Haringey, with most of area falling under the former. Geographically, it is separated from the rest of Finchley by the North Circular, with North Finchley and West Finchley to the north, and Finchley Central (Church End) to the north-west.

East Finchley (East End) was first mentioned in 1365, when it formed a scattered hamlet but, by 1860, it was the most populous part of Finchley. Badly bombed during World War II and, with the subsequent rebuilding, the street pattern of the Old Village was destroyed. However, the area retains a strong community feeling. Finchley was incorporated into Greater London in 1965.

== History ==
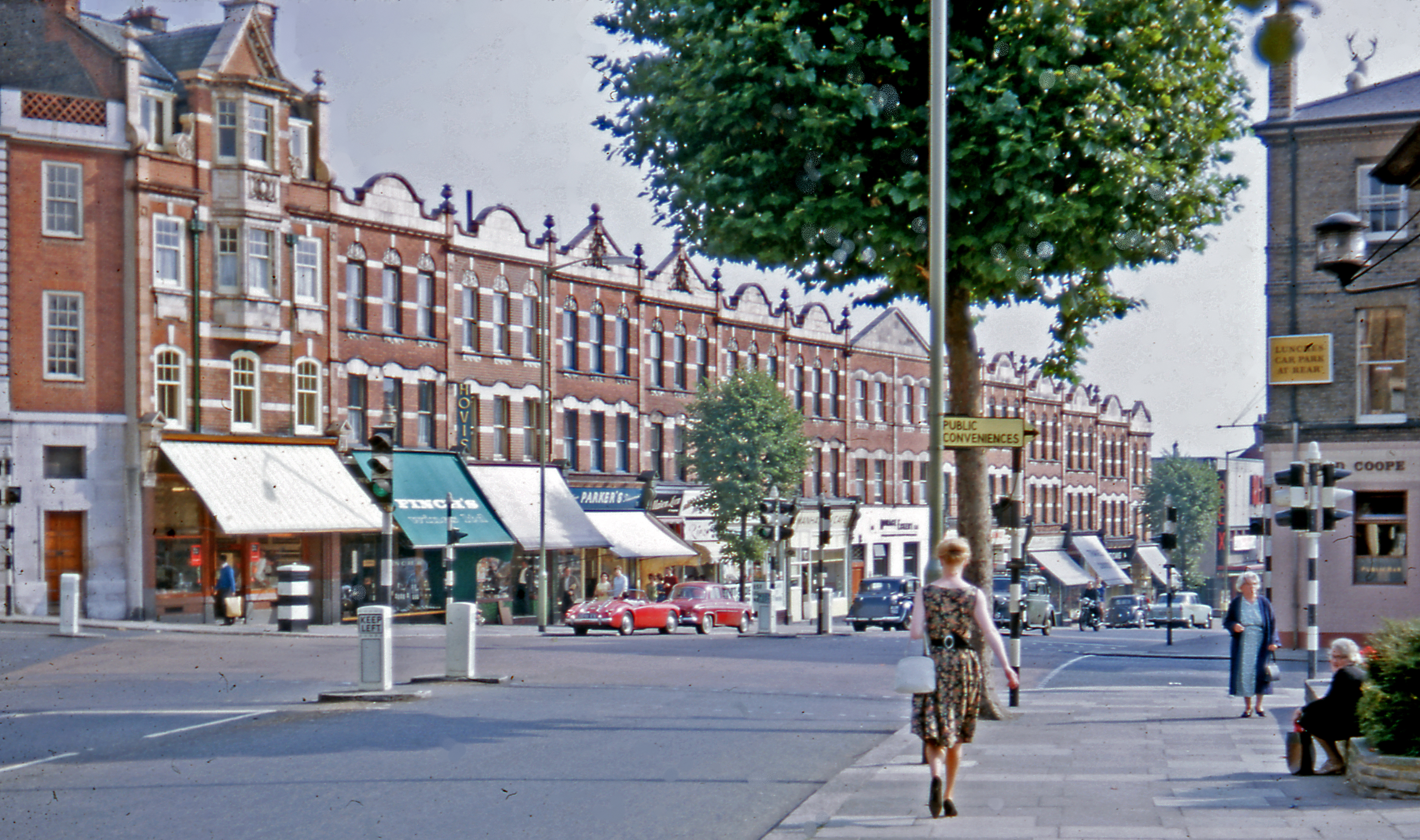
High Road in 1962

The land on which most of East Finchley now stands was once part of the Bishop of London's hunting ground, to the south of Finchley Common; it was first recorded in around 1400. A road was built through his land, named The Bishop's Avenue, which still exists today. Another road extended further north, weaving through what is now Market Place, The Walks, King Street and Oak Lane. As a result, pubs such as the Old White Lion, Bald Faced Stag, and Five Bells (on East End Road) sprang up to provide for other people using the road; these all survive today,

The area of East Finchley Old Village around Church Lane was west of the common and Bulls Lane (now Church Lane) dates back to at least the 17th century. With the coming of the Great Northern Railway in 1868, the area began to emerge, and the property was built gradually between the 1870s and the 1930s. However, it was not until 1914 that a more recognisable East Finchley High Road and surrounding area was visible.

== Governance ==
From around 1547, Finchley had a parish vestry, which became a local board in 1878, an urban district council in 1895, and finally a municipal borough council between 1933 and 1965. The area is now part of the London Borough of Barnet.

From 1959 to 1992, the Finchley constituency was represented in Parliament by Margaret Thatcher, prime minister of the UK from 1979 to 1990. Finchley is now included in the new constituency of Finchley and Golders Green, currently represented by the Labour MP Sarah Sackman. The East Finchley ward is represented on Barnet Council by three elected Labour councillors.

== Geography ==
=== Housing ===
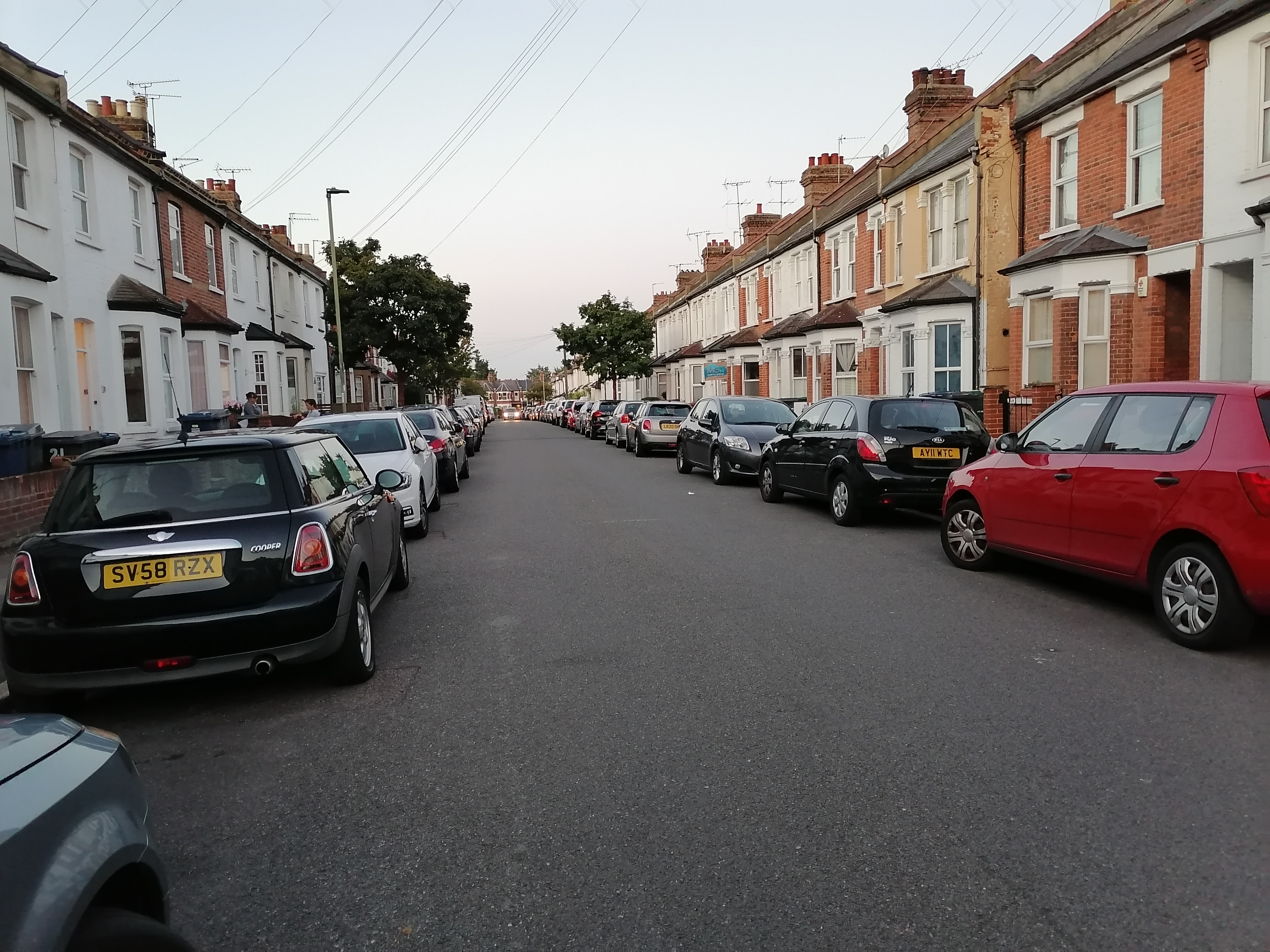
19th century terraced housing

Housing in East Finchley is diverse in its nature, encompassing many housing styles, from 19th-century terraced housing, large 1930s houses and multi-million pound mansions on The Bishop's Avenue. The three 11-storey tower blocks of Prospect Ring and Norfolk Close are visible for miles around. A further even taller tower block in Prospect Ring was completed in 2021.

=== Demography ===
2011 United Kingdom Census
Country of birth	Population
United Kingdom	10,492
(Republic of Ireland) Ireland	420
Poland	350
India	341
South Africa	206

According to the 2011 UK Census:

- 72% of the ward's population was White (52% White British, 4% Irish, 16% Other White)
- 10% Asian British (5% Indian, 1% Pakistani, 1% Chinese, 3% Other Asian)
- 7% Black British (5% African, 1% Caribbean, 1% Other Black)
- The remaining population consists of mixed ethnic groups (2.0% White and Black African/Caribbean, 1.9% White and Asian, 1.7% Other Mixed), Arab and others.

The largest religion was Christianity, claimed by 41% of the population, followed by Judaism and Islam by 9% and 7% of the population respectively. Of the total population, 36% either stated they had no religion (27%) or did not state their religion (9%).

The Ismaili Muslim community, headed by the Aga Khan, worship at a Jamatkhana opened in 1996, which had been built in harmony with the neighbourhood as per the aims of this community. It is located behind the site of the Congregational Church, which had been demolished in 1965 to make way for the shops of Viceroy Parade.

== Education ==
Two state primary schools, including one faith primary school - Holy Trinity (CofE) and the other Martin Primary School are situated in East Finchley. In addition, the east and southern parts of N2 are covered by the catchment of Tetherdown, Coldfall and Highgate primary schools. Pupils on the west side of the area attend Brookland Infant and Junior Schools, which adjoin Christ's College, or Akiva Primary.

Eden Primary School (Jewish) in neighbouring Muswell Hill and Akiva Primary (Jewish) in Finchley both take pupils from the area.

East Finchley is home to two mixed non-selective non-denominational secondary schools:

- Archer Academy (opened 2013)
- Christ's College.

The mixed Roman Catholic secondary school is Bishop Douglass Catholic School.

Pupils on the Muswell Hill side of the area also attend Fortismere School, a mixed comprehensive in the London Borough of Haringey Local Education Authority.

== Amenities and features ==
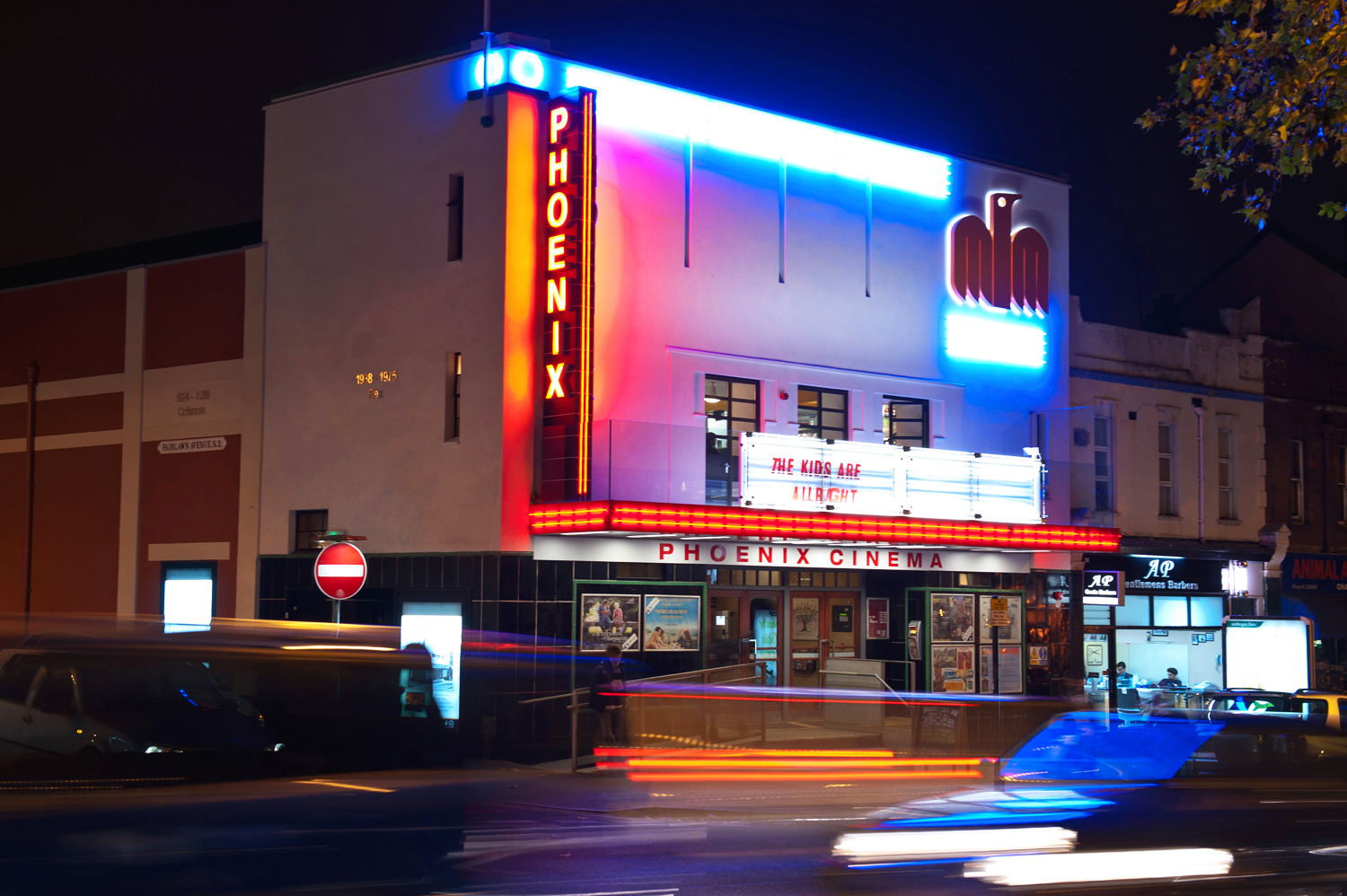
Phoenix Cinema by night

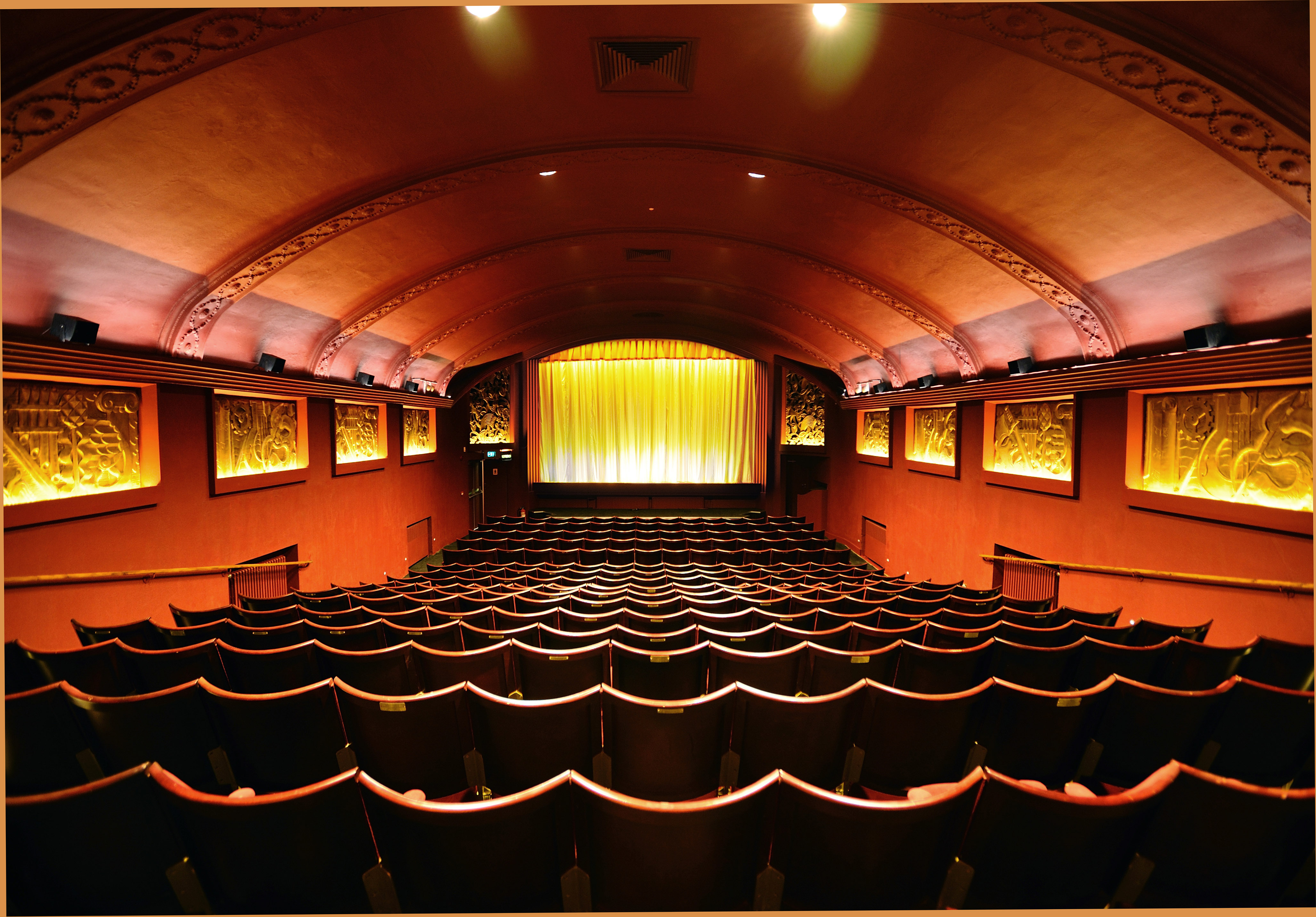
The auditorium

The independent Phoenix Cinema (Note: It was previously called the Coliseum and the Rex.)' is located on the High Road; it regularly shows films with more individual appeal than is the case with the cinema chains. It is the oldest purpose-built cinema in the UK; the only older ones having started life as theatres. Time Out, the arts magazine, described the Phoenix as the best single-screen cinema in London. Film critic Mark Kermode has written that it "remains the single most significant cinema in my development as a bona fide cinema obsessive."

There is a listed Neo-Georgian public library located on the High Road opposite Leslie Road.

Behind the library are some award-winning allotments, owned by Barnet Council. Adjacent to these are the Fuelland allotments, which are held in trust.

St Pancras and Islington Cemetery is located on the High Road. Established in 1854, it is the oldest and largest municipal cemetery in London. The Victorian painter Ford Madox Brown is buried there.

Opposite the tube station is Cherry Tree Wood, which is approximately 11.1 acres (4.5 ha) in size; it contains both woodland and grassland. Nearby parks include Coldfall Wood to the north, with Highgate Wood, Queens Wood and Hampstead Heath to the south.

The UK head office of McDonald's is next to the tube station.

== Transport ==
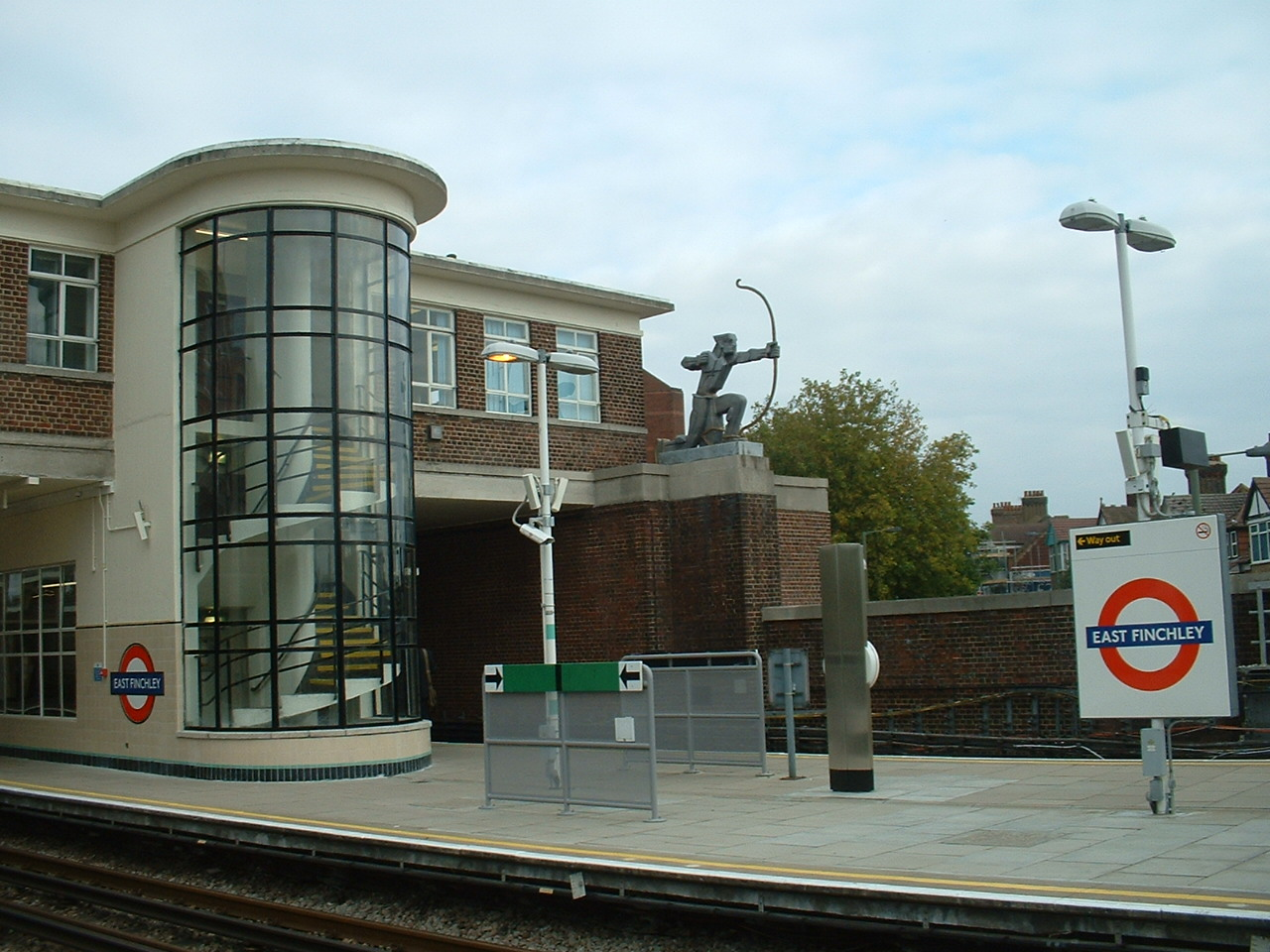
The tube station's southbound platform

East Finchley tube station lies on the High Barnet branch of the Northern line, which serves the City of London (via Bank) and the West End (via Charing Cross) with underground trains every 3–7 minutes.

The following bus routes serve High Road:

- 102 to Edmonton Green
- 143 to Archway and Brent Cross
- 234 between The Spires Barnet and Highgate Wood
- 263 between Barnet Hospital and Highbury Barn
- 603 between Swiss Cottage and Muswell Hill.

== Media ==
The Archer, founded in 1993, is East Finchley's free monthly community newspaper, run by volunteers. It takes its name from the eponymous statue at the tube station.

== In popular culture ==
In Evelyn Waugh's satirical novel Scoop, Lord Copper, owner of the newspaper Daily Beast, lived in East Finchley. "That evening, Mr Salter, foreign editor of The Beast, was summoned to dinner at his chief's country seat at East Finchley."

== Notable people ==
- Ray and Dave Davies, musicians and founders of the English rock band The Kinks, were born on Huntingdon Road. They later lived in Denmark Terrace and played their first gigs in the Clissold Arms
- Gracie Fields, actress, singer, and comedian, lived on The Bishop's Avenue
- Ronald Fisher, polymath, was born in East Finchley
- Noreena Hertz, economist, was born in East Finchley
- Hugo Lloris, footballer and former goalkeeper for Tottenham Hotspur lived in East Finchley
- George Michael, singer, was born in Church Lane
- Thomas Pierrepoint, the official British hangman in the early 1900s, lived in Huntingdon Road. By chance, this is not far where the 18th-century gibbet had stood in Lincoln Road
- Amelia Sach and Annie Walters lived and committed their crimes in East Finchley
- Clive Sansom, poet, playwright and educator, was born in East Finchley in 1910
- Peter Sellers lived with his mother at 211b High Road, which is marked with a blue plaque. In his Goon Show persona as Bluebottle, he was often referred to as an East Finchley Boy Scout
- Will Self grew up between East Finchley and Hampstead Garden Suburb
- Jerry Springer lived at Belvedere Court, on Lyttleton Road until he was four years old, when his family moved to the United States
- Amy Winehouse lived in East Finchley.

== See also ==
- Hampstead Garden Suburb
- Highgate
- Frederick Richard Simms
- The Bishops Avenue.
