= Sasan Castle =

Castle in Qazvin Province, Iran

Sasan castle
- قلعه ساسان

General information
- Type: Castle
- Location: Qazvin County, Iran

Sasan Castle (Persian: قلعه ساسان) is a historical castle in Qazvin County, Qazvin Province, Iran. The origin of this fortress dates back to the historical periods after Islam.
