= Halis Toprak =

Turkish businessman of Kurdish origin. (1938-2016)

- Born: 1938; Lice, Diyarbakır Province,Turkey
- Died: 3 January 2016; Nice, France
- Resting place: Zincirlikuyu Cemetery,Istanbul, Turkey
- Occupation: Businessman
- Known for: Founder of Toprak Holding
- Title: Chairman of Toprak Holding
- Children: 12

Halis Toprak (1938 – 3 January 2016) was a Turkish businessman in the construction industry.

He was the founder of Toprak Holding, a Turkish industrial conglomerate established in 1977, with operations spanning construction, ceramics, paper manufacturing, pharmaceuticals and food production. He also established Toprakbank, which became part of the group in 1992.

== Early life ==
Toprak was born in 1938 in Lice, a district of Diyarbakır Province in southeastern Turkey, and is of Kurdish origin. His family was involved in commerce, and he began his business career in Adana before later establishing his enterprises in Istanbul.

== Business career ==
In 1977, Toprak established Toprak İnşaat in Istanbul, followed by the incorporation of Toprak Holding A.Ş. on 16 May of the same year. The group subsequently expanded into several industries, including ceramics, paper products, pharmaceuticals, food and construction materials. Toprak served as chairman of the holding company for more than three decades before transferring the position to his son Mehmet Toprak in 2009.

In the 1990s, he built the 30,000 sq ft (2,800 m2) Toprak Mansion at 46A The Bishops Avenue, London, which when it sold in 2008 for £50 million, was the UK's most expensive home.

Toprak started his career in Adana province, and by his death, he owned Toprak Holding, owhich was "active in 30 sectors including the pharmaceutical industry, ceramics, paper, catering and more".

== Toprakbank and financial restructuring ==
In 1992, Toprak established Toprakbank through companies belonging to the Toprak Group. Following financial difficulties, the bank was transferred to the Savings Deposit Insurance Fund of Turkey (TMSF) on 30 November 2001. The transfer was preceded by regulatory concerns regarding the bank's financial position, including loans extended to group companies, capital deficiencies and liquidity problems.

The TMSF assumed control over companies belonging to the Toprak Group in 2009 as part of the debt recovery process. Following negotiations, the parties reached an agreement in June 2012 under which the group's outstanding obligations were settled partly through the transfer of real estate assets to the fund. Management of 22 companies and 21 industrial facilities was scheduled to return to the Toprak family on 29 June 2012, with Halis Toprak resuming the chairmanship.

In March 2016, the Constitutional Court of Turkey ruled on an individual application filed by Toprak and other former shareholders concerning the transfer of Toprakbank. The court concluded that their constitutional right to property had not been violated.

== Personal life ==
Toprak was known in Turkish business circles by the nickname "Halis Ağa". He had a large family, and several of his children were involved in the management of the Toprak Group. His son Mehmet Toprak succeeded him as chairman in 2009, before Halis Toprak returned to the position in 2012.

== Death ==
Toprak died on 3 January 2016 in Nice, France, after receiving hospital treatment for a heart condition. His body was subsequently brought to Istanbul, where a funeral service was held at the Ortaköy Mosque on 5 January 2016. He was buried in the family plot at Zincirlikuyu Cemetery.
