= Arie Belldegrun =

American physician

Arie S. Belldegrun
- אריה בלדגרון
- Born: 1949 (age 76–77); Tel Aviv, Israel
- Citizenship: Israeli; American
- Education: Hebrew University of Jerusalem; Weizmann Institute of Science
- Years active: 1988–present
- Known for: Founder of Kite Pharma
- Spouse: Rebecka Belldegrun
- Children: 4
- Relatives: Poju Zabludowicz (brother-in-law); Anita Zabludowicz (sister-in-law)

Arie S. Belldegrun (Hebrew: אריה בלדגרון; born 1949) is an Israeli-American urologic oncologist, billionaire businessman and investor.

== Early life and education ==
Belldegrun was born in Tel Aviv, Israel. He received his medical degree from the Hadassah Medical Center at Hebrew University of Jerusalem in 1974, and conducted his post-graduate studies at the Weizmann Institute of Science in 1979. He completed his urologic surgery residency at Harvard Medical School in 1985, and his Surgical Oncology fellowship at the National Cancer Institute in 1988. He is certified by the American Board of Urology, and is a fellow of the American College of Surgeons and the American Association of Genitourinary Surgeons. Belldegrun is the director of the UCLA Institute of Urologic Oncology, professor of urology, and chief of the Division of Urologic Oncology at the David Geffen School of Medicine.

== Career ==
In 1996, Belldegrun established his first company, Agensys, which was an early-stage privately held biotechnology company based in Los Angeles. The company was focused on the development of fully human monoclonal antibodies to treat solid tumor cancers in a variety of cancer targets. He was its founding chairman from 1996 to 2002, and then a director. In December 2007, Agensys was acquired by Astellas Pharma in a deal valued at US$537 million.

In 2003, Belldegrun became the founding vice-chairman of the board of directors and chairman of the scientific advisory board of Cougar Biotechnology; the company had a focus in the field of oncology. In July 2009, Cougar Biotechnology was acquired by Johnson & Johnson in a $970 million transaction. In April 2011, the United States Food and Drug Administration approved abiraterone acetate (Zytiga), Cougar's lead product, for late-stage prostate cancer.

In 2008, Belldegrun became the chairman and partner of Two River, a New York-based venture capital firm and merchant bank focused on the life science sector. Two River specializes in investments in life science, biotechnology, and in firms focused on developing preventative and therapeutic technologies for a broad spectrum of disease areas including oncology, cardiovascular disease, neurological disorders, and companion animal health care.

Belldegrun is the founder, chairman, president and CEO of Kite Pharma. Founded in 2009, the company went public in June 2014. Based in Santa Monica, Kite Pharma is a commercial-stage biopharmaceutical company engaged in the development of novel cancer immunotherapy products with a primary focus on engineered autologous T cell therapy (eACT) designed to restore the immune system's ability to recognize and eradicate tumors. On August 28, 2017, Gilead Sciences announced that it would acquire Kite Pharma for $11.9 billion in an all-cash deal, equating to $180 cash per share. The deal added a CAR-T candidate to Gilead's existing portfolio. The acquisition was completed in October 2017. In October 2017, Kite Pharma's therapy, Yescarta (axicabtagene ciloleucel) became the first CAR-T therapy approved by the FDA for the treatment of adult patients with relapsed or refractory large B-cell lymphoma after two or more lines of systemic therapy.

In 2017, Belldegrun became the co-founder and senior managing director of Vida Ventures, a Boston-based life sciences investment firm that consists of scientists, physicians, entrepreneurs, and investors passionate about building and funding breakthroughs in biomedicine. Vida Ventures has a bicoastal presence. In June 2021, Vida Ventures closed its third fund (Vida Ventures III) with $825 million. Vida Ventures currently has approximately $1.7 billion in assets under management.

In 2017, Belldegrun co-founded and is the executive chairman of Allogene Therapeutics, a San Francisco-based biotechnology company. Allogene has raised $300 in Series A fundraising, and $120 million in a private financing round. On October 11, 2018, Allogene Therapeutics raised $324 million in an initial public offering on the NASDAQ, listing under the ticker "ALLO".

In July 2019, it was reported that Bellco Capital, Belldegrun's family office, has entered into a joint venture with Tishman Speyer to start Breakthrough Properties. Belldegrun is the co-chairman, while his son, Dan, is the company's CEO. The company purchased its first property in Boston's Seaport District for $80 million. In November 2020, Breakthrough Properties closed its first fund (Breakthrough Life Science Property Fund) with $1 billion.

In May 2021, it was reported that Belldegrun's Bellco Capital is co-sponsoring the $2.5 billion merger of Ginkgo Bioworks with Soaring Eagle Acquisition Corp. (a SPAC), with a pre-money valuation of $15 billion. Ginkgo Bioworks is now trading on the NYSE under the ticker "DNA". Belldegrun is on the board of directors of Ginkgo Bioworks.

In 2014, according to the Bloomberg Pay Index, Belldegrun was ranked the 8th highest-paid executive in the United States, with a pay package valued at $95.2 million. In 2015, The Hollywood Reporter's annual Hollywood's Top Doctors list included Belldegrun as one of the highest-rated urologists.

In 2021, in its annual ranking of the wealthiest people in Israel, Forbes Israel ranked Arie and Rebecka Belldegrun 36th with a net worth of $1.75 billion. They have donated over $1 million to the University of Pennsylvania School of Arts and Sciences, and have donated a $5 million sculpture to LACMA.

Belldegrun was featured in the 2017–2021 editions of the LA500-LA's Most Influential People, compiled by the Los Angeles Business Journal, and has been named Business Leader of the Year for 2018 in the Health Care category for a life dedicated to finding cures for cancer. In June 2018, Belldegrun received the EY Master Entrepreneur Award at the Entrepreneur of the Year 2018 Awards.

Belldegrun has written over 500 scientific publications related to urologic oncology and has authored several books on prostate and kidney cancers. He was one of the speakers at the Milken Institute Global Conference 2013, delivered the Andrew C. Novick Memorial Lecture at the Ninth International Kidney Cancer Symposium, and presents at the Annual J.P. Morgan Healthcare Conference. It was announced that Belldegrun will present at the 34th Annual J.P. Morgan Healthcare Conference in January 2016.

Belldegrun is a member of the advisory board of the Vagelos Program in Life Sciences and Management at the University of Pennsylvania and as a member of the strategic advisory group of the Parker Institute for Cancer Immunotherapy. Belldegrun also is on the board of directors of Kronos Bio, Fosun Kite, UroGen Pharma, Pontifax, ByHeart, and IconOVir Bio. In the past, he was on the board of directors of Teva Pharmaceuticals, Cell Design Labs, Arno Therapeutics, SonaCare Medical, Roei Medical Technologies, Oncura, Nile Therapeutics, Hana Biosciences, Paramount Acquisition Corp and Chem Rx Corp.

== Personal life ==
Belldegrun is married to Rebecka Belldegrun and together they have four children. They reside in Bel Air, Los Angeles.
