= Andreas Panayiotou (businessman) =

British property developer

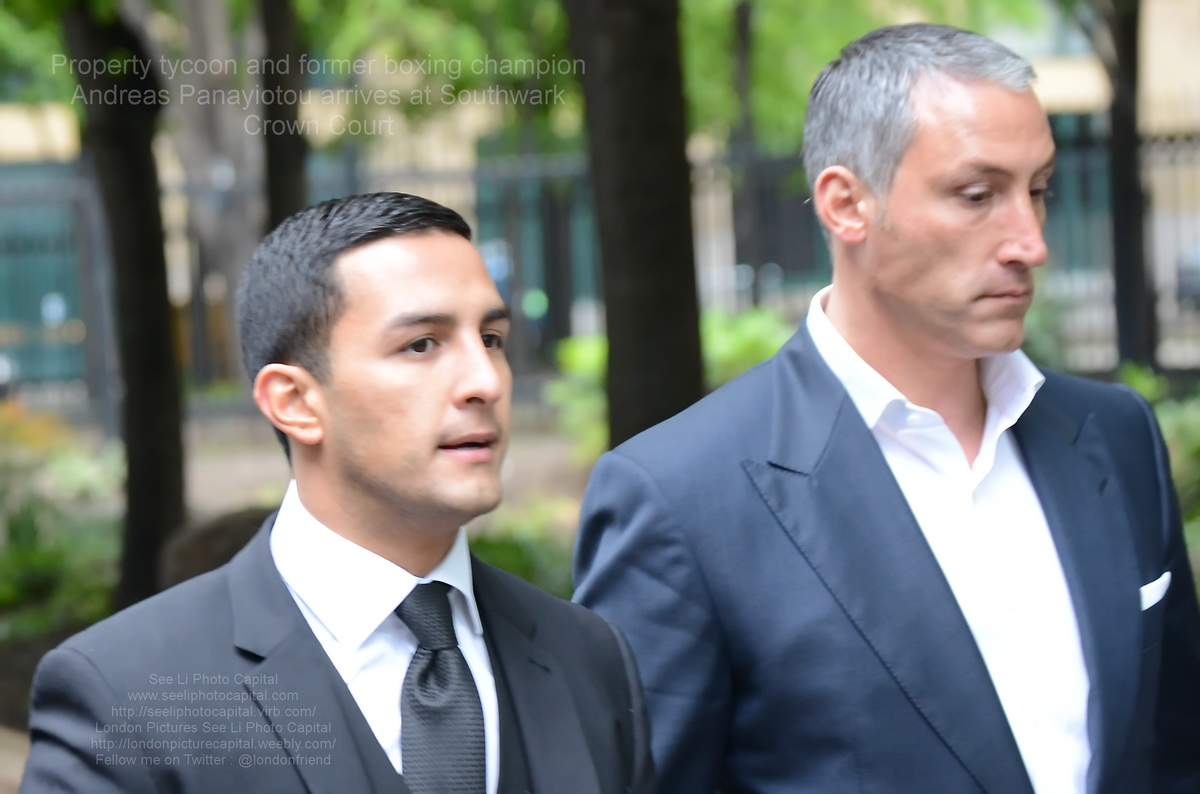
- Andreas Panayiotou arriving at Southwark Crown Court for his son's court case
- Born: January 1966 (age 60); London, England
- Occupation: Hotelier
- Known for: Founder, Ability Group
- Spouse: Susan
- Children: 5

Andreas Panayiotou (born January 1966) is a British property developer, the founder of Ability Group, and once the UK's largest private landlord, until he sold up in 2006/07 and moved into hotels.

== Early life ==
Panayiotou was born in London, the son of Cypriot parents. He left school aged 14 without any qualifications. He was kicked out for punching his PE teacher, and went on to become the Essex under-16 amateur middleweight boxing champion.

== Career ==
He started working for his father, before buying an Islington house, converting it into flats, and building one of the UK's largest buy-to-let empires, selling about 7,000 flats and houses in 2006–07, and moving into hotels.

According to Panayiotou,

I was the largest private landlord in the UK. I was looking at the returns on my investment – they had been 25%-plus during that period. Then the market started to understand residential; there was the buy-to-let phenomenon ... yields went from 25% to about 3% over the period. To me, it became very straightforward. It wasn't a good investment. I found myself with a big war chest [in 2007]. Where do we go from there? The nearest asset class to residential is hotels. Looking at hotels you can add more value, as against residential where, once it's built and let, you're relying on indexation on rents – with hotels you can improve facilities – build a gym, conference facilities.

His company, Ability Group, had seven hotels in 2011. As of June 2011, he has a £400 million net worth.

== Personal life ==
He has two sons from his first marriage. He and his second wife Susan live on a 20-acre estate in Epping Forest, and have three daughters. Panayiotou owns a £40-million Gulfstream G450 jet, a £12-million Mangusta 130 yacht, and two Cessna Citation jets, as well as a Range Rover, Ferrari Enzo, Lamborghini LP700, Rolls-Royce Phantom convertible, and a Bugatti Veyron.
