= Rebecka Belldegrun =

American physician

- רבקה בלדגרין
- Born: Rebecka Zabludowicz; 1950 (age 75–76); Helsinki, Finland
- Citizenship: Israeli and American
- Education: Sackler School of Medicine
- Occupations: President and CEO of Bellco Capital
- Years active: 1986–present
- Spouse: Arie Belldegrun
- Children: 4
- Parent(s): Pola and Shlomo Zabludowicz
- Relatives: Poju Zabludowicz (brother); Anita Zabludowicz (sister-in-law)

Rebecka Belldegrun (Hebrew: רבקה בלדגרין; born 1950) is a Finnish-born Israeli-American billionaire businesswoman.

== Early life and education ==
Belldegrun was born in Helsinki, Finland, to Pola and Shlomo Zabludowicz. Her younger brother is Poju Zabludowicz. She received her medical degree from the Sackler School of Medicine at Tel Aviv University, and later completed her Ophthalmic Surgery residency in Israel, and her fellowship in corneal surgery at Harvard Medical School.

== Career ==
In 1986, Belldegrun founded Intertech Corporation, a New York-based real estate company specializing in real estate development, investments, and acquisitions. She expanded Intertech's businesses and holdings to include interests in high-tech, biotechnology, hotel management and industrial manufacturing in the United States, England, Scandinavia, Eastern Europe and Israel. She was president of the company until 2003.

Belldegrun is the CEO and president of Bellco Capital, a Los Angeles-based venture capital firm which she founded in 2003. Bellco Capital focuses on finding seed investments and experienced management to early-stage and start-up companies, as well as on leveraged acquisitions of, and growth equity investments in leading middle-market enterprises. The company's business transactions include international private equity investments in retail, high-tech, biotechnology and real estate.

=== Board memberships ===
Belldegrun is a member of a number of boards, including:

- BabyFirstTV – director, founding investor
- Brentwood School – chairman emeritus of the board of trustees
- California Institute of Technology – trustee
- LACMA – trustee
- Institute for Strategic Threat Analysis and Response at the University of Pennsylvania – member of the external advisory board
- LSM at the University of Pennsylvania – member of the advisory board
- Kronos Bio – director
- Breakthrough Properties – director

In the past, Belldegrun was a member of the following boards:

- Columbia University – member of the board of visitors
- Interdisciplinary Center Herzliya – member of the board of trustees
- RAND Corporation – member of the board of advisors
- USC Center on Public Diplomacy – member of the advisory board

== Personal life ==
Belldegrun is married to Arie Belldegrun and together they have four children. They reside in Bel Air.

In 2021, in its annual ranking of the wealthiest people in Israel, Forbes Israel ranked Rebecka and Arie Belldegrun 36th with a personal net worth of $1.75 billion. They have donated over $1 million to the University of Pennsylvania School of Arts and Sciences, and have donated a $5 million sculpture to LACMA.
