= Bel Air, Los Angeles =

Neighborhood of Los Angeles, California

Bel Air
- Neighborhood
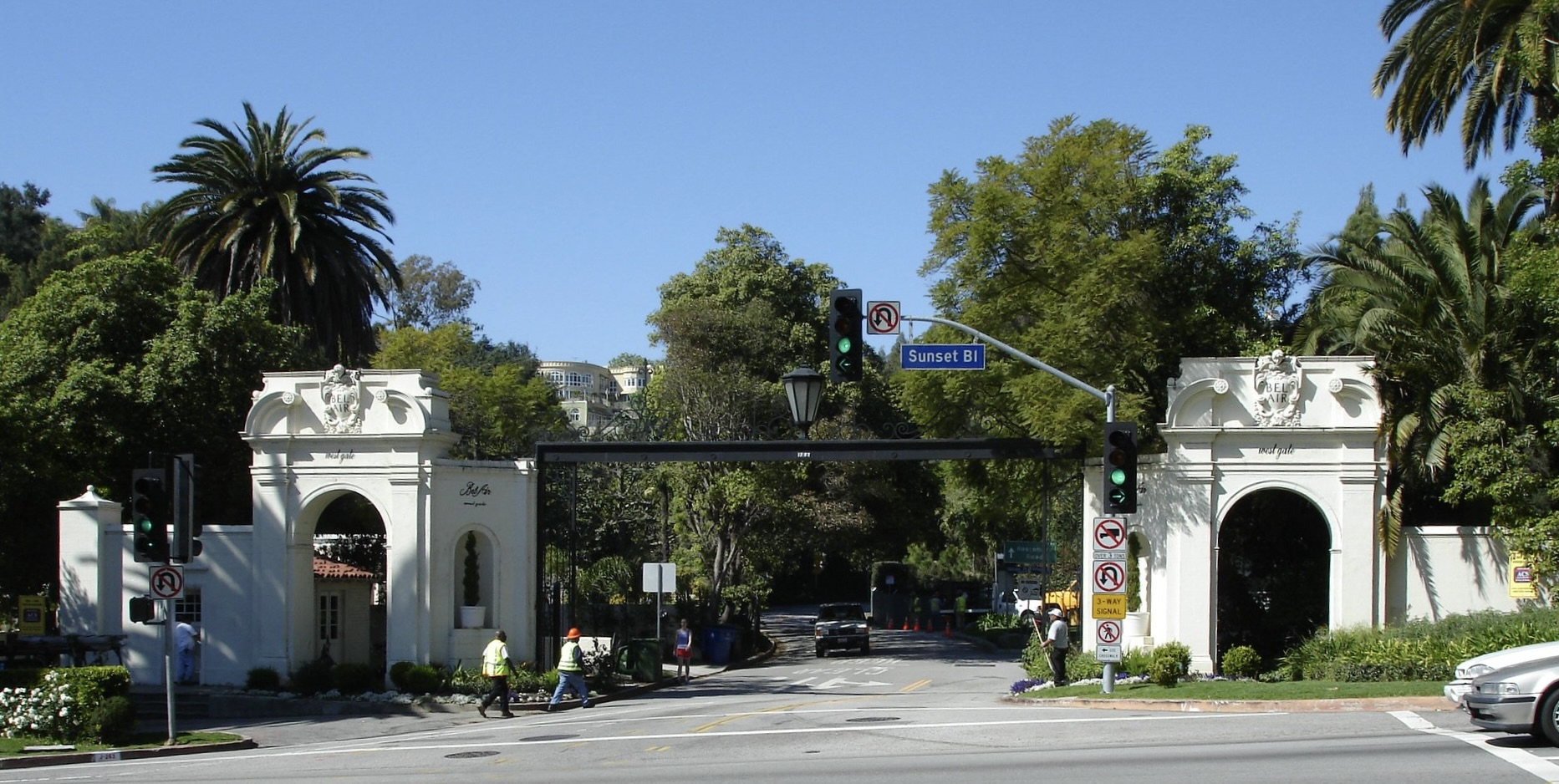
- The Bel Air west gate at Sunset and Bellagio

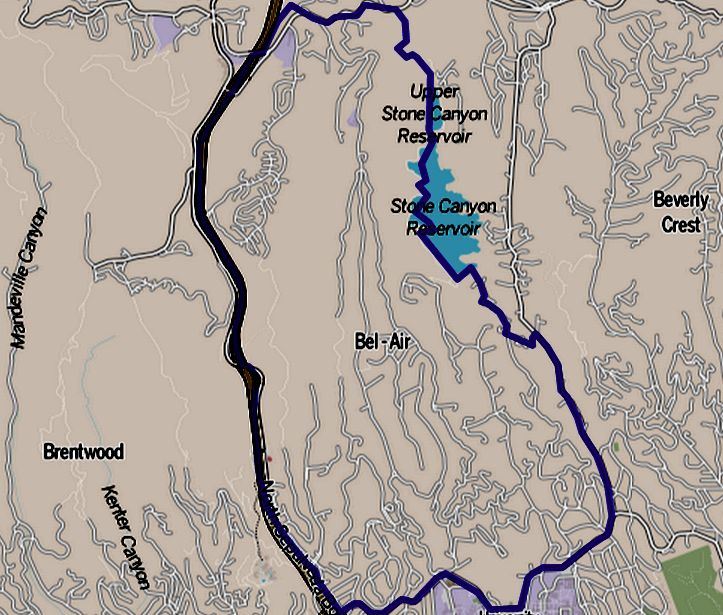
- Boundaries of Bel Air as drawn by the Los Angeles Times

- Location within West Los Angeles
- Coordinates: 34°05′00″N 118°26′52″W
- Country: United States
- State: California
- County: Los Angeles
- City: Los Angeles

Population (2023)
  - Total: 7,351
- Time zone: UTC-8:00

Bel Air is a residential neighborhood in the Westside region on the foothills of the Santa Monica Mountains of Los Angeles, California, United States.

Together with Beverly Hills and Holmby Hills, Bel Air forms the Platinum Triangle of Los Angeles neighborhoods. Bel Air, Beverly Hills, and the Los Angeles community of Brentwood are also known as the "three Bs".

== History ==
Entrance to Bel-Air, 1923

The community was founded in 1923 by Alphonzo Bell. Bell owned farm property in Santa Fe Springs, California, where oil was discovered. He bought a large ranch with a home on what is now Bel Air Road. He subdivided and developed the property with large residential lots, with work on the master plan led by the landscape architect Mark Daniels. He also built the Bel-Air Bay Club in Pacific Palisades and the Bel-Air Country Club. His wife chose Italian names for the streets. She also founded the Bel-Air Garden Club in 1931.

Bel-Air derives its name from the initial Mexican Land Grant known as Rancho San Jose de Buenos Ayres (Saint Joseph of Good Air). This region was initially a rancho, which was granted to Maximo Alanis by the Mexican Governor of California, Manuel Micheltorena, on February 24, 1843.

=== Fires ===
On November 6, 1961, a fire ignited and devastated the community of Bel Air, destroying 484 homes. On December 6, 2017, a fire started by a homeless encampment burned in the same area, destroying six homes.

== Geography ==
Bel Air is about 12 miles (19 km) west of Downtown Los Angeles, set entirely within the Santa Monica Mountains. It lies across Sunset Boulevard from the University of California, Los Angeles's main campus. At its heart are the Bel-Air Country Club and the Hotel Bel-Air.

=== Climate ===
The region experiences warm and dry summers. According to the Köppen Climate Classification system, Bel Air has a warm-summer Mediterranean climate, abbreviated "Csb" on climate maps.

Climate data for Bel-Air, Los Angeles
Month	Jan	Feb	Mar	Apr	May	Jun	Jul	Aug	Sep	Oct	Nov	Dec	Year
Mean daily maximum °F (°C)	67 (19)	68 (20)	69 (21)	73 (23)	74 (23)	78 (26)	83 (28)	84 (29)	82 (28)	79 (26)	72 (22)	68 (20)	75 (24)
Mean daily minimum °F (°C)	47 (8)	48 (9)	49 (9)	51 (11)	54 (12)	58 (14)	61 (16)	62 (17)	61 (16)	57 (14)	51 (11)	47 (8)	54 (12)
Average precipitation inches (mm)	4.27 (108)	4.91 (125)	3.75 (95)	0.92 (23)	0.34 (8.6)	0.10 (2.5)	0.02 (0.51)	0.17 (4.3)	0.31 (7.9)	0.61 (15)	1.43 (36)	2.38 (60)	19.20 (488)

== Demographics ==
The 2000 U.S. census counted 7,691 residents in the 6.37-square-mile (16.5 km^{2}) Bel Air neighborhood; with 1,207 per square mile (466/km^{2}) it has among the lowest population densities for the city and the county. In 2008, the city estimated that the population had increased to 8,253.

In 2000, the median age for residents was 46, which was high for city and county neighborhoods. The percentages of residents aged 50 and older was among the county's highest.

The median yearly household income in 2008 was $207,938, the highest figure for any neighborhood or city in Los Angeles County. Renters occupied 14.5% of the housing stock, and house- or apartment-owners held 85.5%. The average household size of 2.4 people was considered typical for Los Angeles.

The 4.1% of families headed by single parents was considered low for city and county neighborhoods. The percentages of married people in Bel Air were among the county's highest—66.0% for men and 65.7% for women. There were 808 veterans, or 12.9% of the population.

The neighborhood was considered "not especially diverse" ethnically within Los Angeles, with a relatively high percentage of white people. The breakdown was whites, 83.0%; Asians, 8.2%; Latinos, 4.6%; African Americans, 0.9%; and others, 3.2%. Iran (26.1%) and South Africa (8.2%) were the most common places of birth for the 24.1% of the residents who were born abroad—which was an average percentage for Los Angeles as a whole.

=== Neighborhoods ===
Of several entrances, there are two main ones: the East Gate at Beverly Glen and Sunset Boulevards and the West Gate at Bellagio Way and Sunset Boulevard, opposite an entrance to UCLA. Bel Air is generally subdivided into three distinct neighborhoods: East Gate Old Bel Air, West Gate Bel Air, and Upper Bel Air.

Bel Air Estates, the original subdivision of the Bel Air community, is generally bounded by Nimes Road to the north, Sunset Boulevard to the south, Beverly Glen Boulevard to the east and both sides of Bel Air Road to the west.

== Attractions ==
The Hannah Carter Japanese Garden is in Bel Air. It was inspired by the gardens of Kyoto. Many structures in the garden—the main gate, garden house, bridges, and shrine—were built in Japan and reassembled on site. Antique stone carvings, water basins and lanterns, as well as the five-tiered pagoda, and key symbolic rocks are also from Japan.

== Government and infrastructure ==
The Los Angeles County Department of Health Services SPA 5 West Area Health Office serves Bel Air.

Bel Air is in the 5th city council district, represented by Katy Yaroslavsky. It is in the 90077 (Bel Air Estates & Beverly Glen) ZIP code, which is part of the city of Los Angeles. Stone Canyon Reservoir lies in the northeastern part of Bel Air. Established in 1994, it serves around 500,000 people. The Bel Air Association, operational since 1942, is dedicated to preserving the residential community's aesthetic appearance. It is at the East Gate, at 100 Bel Air Road.

== Emergency services ==
=== Fire services ===
Los Angeles Fire Department Station 71 is in the area.

=== Police services ===
The Los Angeles Police Department operates the West Los Angeles Community Police Station at 1663 Butler Avenue, 90025, serving the neighborhood.

== Education ==
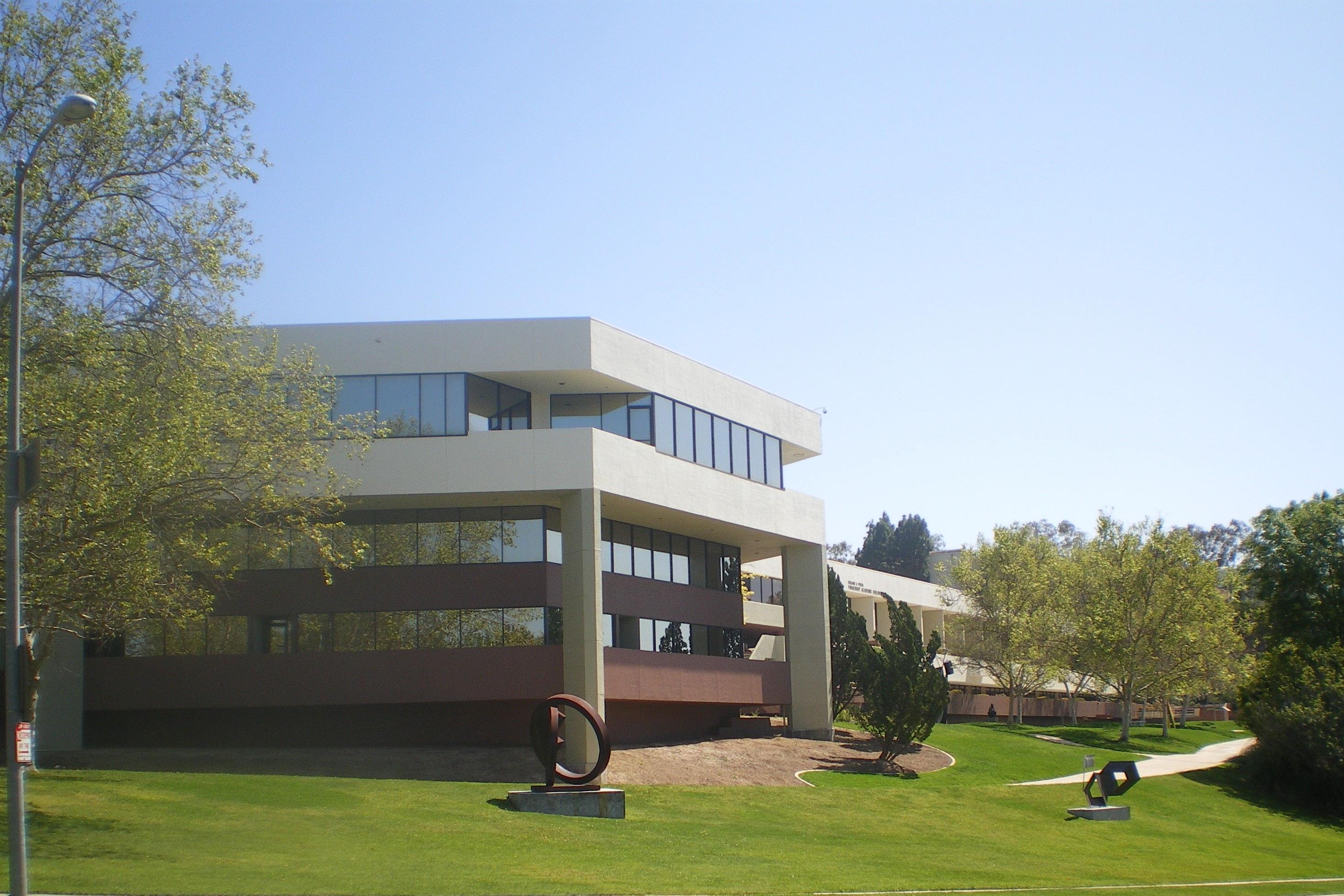
The American Jewish University, located in the Bel Air Casiano neighborhood

Almost two-thirds (66.1%) of Bel Air residents over 24 had earned a four-year degree by 2000, a high percentage for the city and the county. The percentages of residents in that age range with a bachelor's degree were high for the county. The community is in the Los Angeles Unified School District. The area is in Board District 4. As of 2009, Steve Zimmer represented the district.

=== Schools ===
Schools in Bel Air are as follows:

==== Public ====
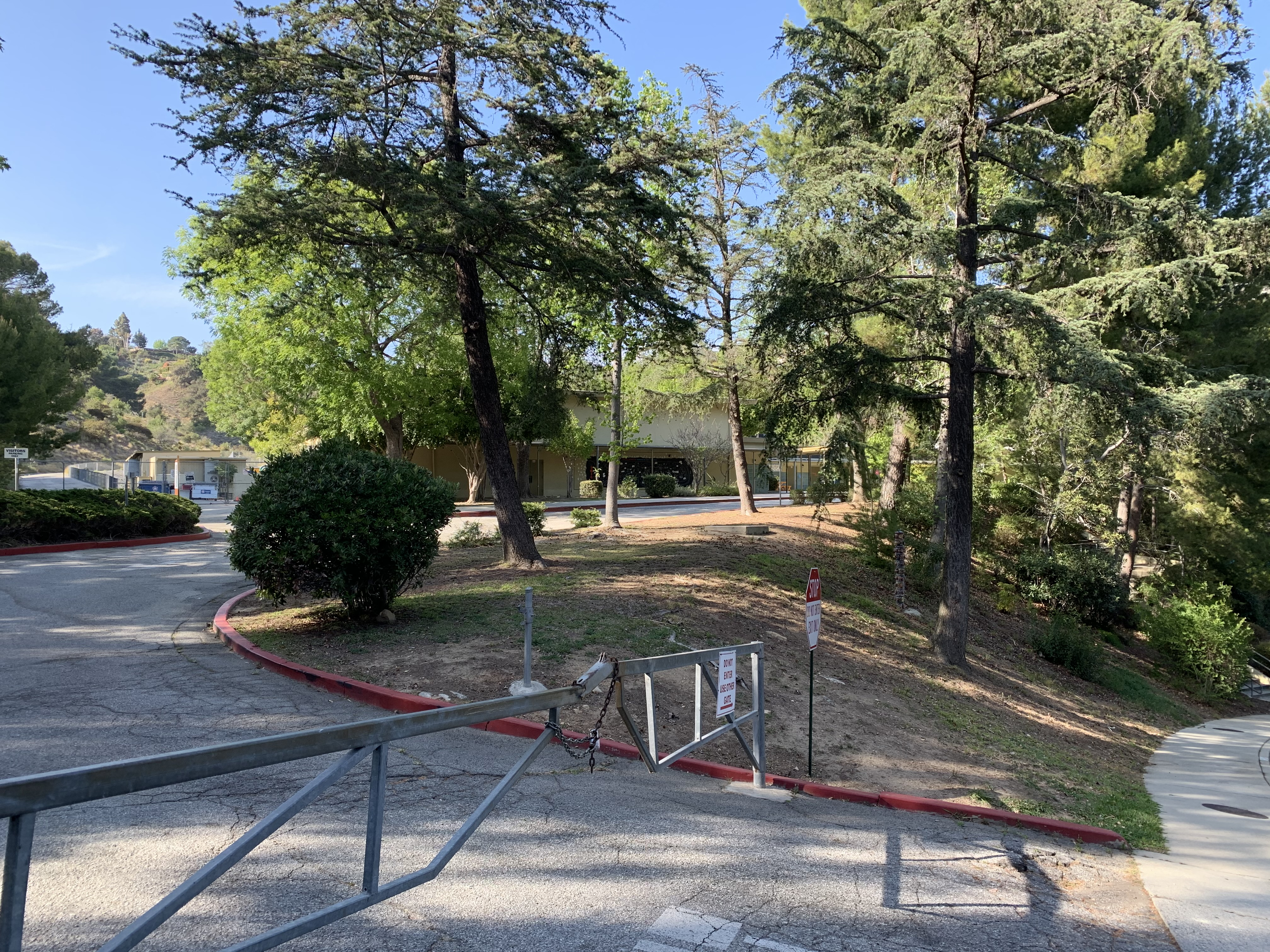
Community Magnet Charter School

- Roscomare Road Elementary School, 2425 Roscomare Road
- Community Magnet Charter Elementary School, 11301 Bellagio Road. As of 2010, because the school's points-based admissions system does not favor area residents, children living in Bel Air generally do not attend the school. It is on the former Bellagio Road School campus.

Roscomare Road and Warner Avenue Elementary School in Westwood are the zoned elementary schools serving Bel Air. Bel Air is within the attendance boundaries of Emerson Middle School in Westwood and University High School, West Los Angeles.

In April 1983, an advisory committee of the LAUSD recommended closing eight LAUSD schools, including Bellagio Road School. The committee did not target Fairburn Avenue School in Westwood, as a way of allowing it to preserve its ethnic balance, and so it could take children from Bellagio Road in case it closed. In August 1983, the board publicly considered closing Bellagio, which had 240 students at the time. The school's enrollment had been decreasing, but the board had voted in May to keep the school open. In February 1984, after the composition of the board had changed, it voted to close the school.

Bel Air formerly housed the Bellagio Road Newcomer School, a 3rd–8th grade school for newly arrived immigrants. In 2002, it had 390 students from Armenia, China, El Salvador, Guatemala, Korea, Russia, and other countries. This program was housed in the former Bellagio Road school.

==== Private ====
- Marymount High School, 10643 Sunset Boulevard
- Stephen S. Wise Temple Elementary School/Milken Community Schools, K–12, 15500 Stephen S. Wise Drive
- John Thomas Dye School, K–6, 11414 Chalon Road
- The Mirman School
- Westland School, 16200 Mulholland Drive, was founded in 1949. It moved to its current location in 1965, becoming the first school to locate in what has now developed into a major 'institutional corridor' in the area of the Sepulveda Pass.

==== University ====
Bel Air is home to the American Jewish University. Additionally, Bel Air borders the University of California, Los Angeles on the south.

== In popular culture ==
Television shows and films have been filmed in Bel Air, or are said to take place in the community. Exterior shots for the Beverly Hillbillies were shot in and around 750 Bel Air Road, built by Lynn Atkinson (and later sold to hotelier Arnold Kirkeby after Atkinson's wife refused to move into a house she thought too ostentatious).

Several scenes in the 2015 film Get Hard were set in Bel Air. Exterior scenes from films such as Get Shorty (1995) were also filmed in the area.

Several episodes of the television show The Rockford Files were filmed in Bel Air.

The sitcom The Fresh Prince of Bel-Air, starring actor and rapper Will Smith, was set in the neighborhood, although exterior shots were filmed in Brentwood.

The Bel Air house featured in the 1960 film Strangers When We Meet was built and completed during filming, and still stands today as a private residence.

The Bel Air Film Festival, first held in 2008, is an annual international film festival held in Bel Air and the Los Angeles area.

Bel Air has also been represented in music, including in two songs by Lana Del Rey and Katseye, both entitled "Bel Air".

The Chevrolet Bel Air was a full-size car produced by Chevrolet for the 1950–1975 model years.

== Notable people ==
- Jennifer Aniston, actress
- Warner Baxter, actor
- Arie and Rebecka Belldegrun, doctors
- Jack Benny, comedian
- Beyoncé and Jay-Z, musicians and businesspeople
- Wilt Chamberlain, Basketball Hall of Fame inductee
- Glenn Cowan, table tennis player
- Clint Eastwood, actor, film director
- Eric Eisner, Hollywood lawyer and executive, former president of The Geffen Film Company
- Zsa Zsa Gabor, socialite and actress, at 1001 Bel Air Road from 1973 to 2016
- John Gilbert, actor
- George Herbert Harries, US Army major general
- Kathy Hilton, socialite and philanthropist
- Richard Hilton, businessman and real estate broker
- Alfred Hitchcock, film director
- Ethan and Hila Klein, former YouTube personalities and podcasters, separated
- Lee Iacocca, former automobile executive and chief executive officer, Chrysler
- Mary Livingstone, actress and comedian
- Sondra Locke, actress, film director
- Joni Mitchell, singer-songwriter
- Steven Mnuchin, 77th United States Secretary of the Treasury
- Leonard Nimoy, actor, film director, poet, singer and photographer
- Chris Paul, basketball athlete
- Ronald Reagan and First Lady Nancy Reagan
- Naty Saidoff, diamond dealer, real estate investor, founding member of the Israeli-American Council
- Darren Star, show and movie producer, writer
- Sydney Sweeney, actress
- Elizabeth Taylor, actress, lived at 700 Nimes Road from 1982 until 2011
- Walter and Shirley Wang, Chinese-American philanthropists, son and daughter-in-law of Taiwanese business magnate Wang Yung-ching
- The Weeknd, singer-songwriter, actor
- Quincy Jones, record producer, songwriter, composer, arranger, and film and television producer

== See also ==
- List of districts and neighborhoods in Los Angeles
- List of largest houses in the Los Angeles Metropolitan Area
