= John Jay Hall =

Dormitory at Columbia University

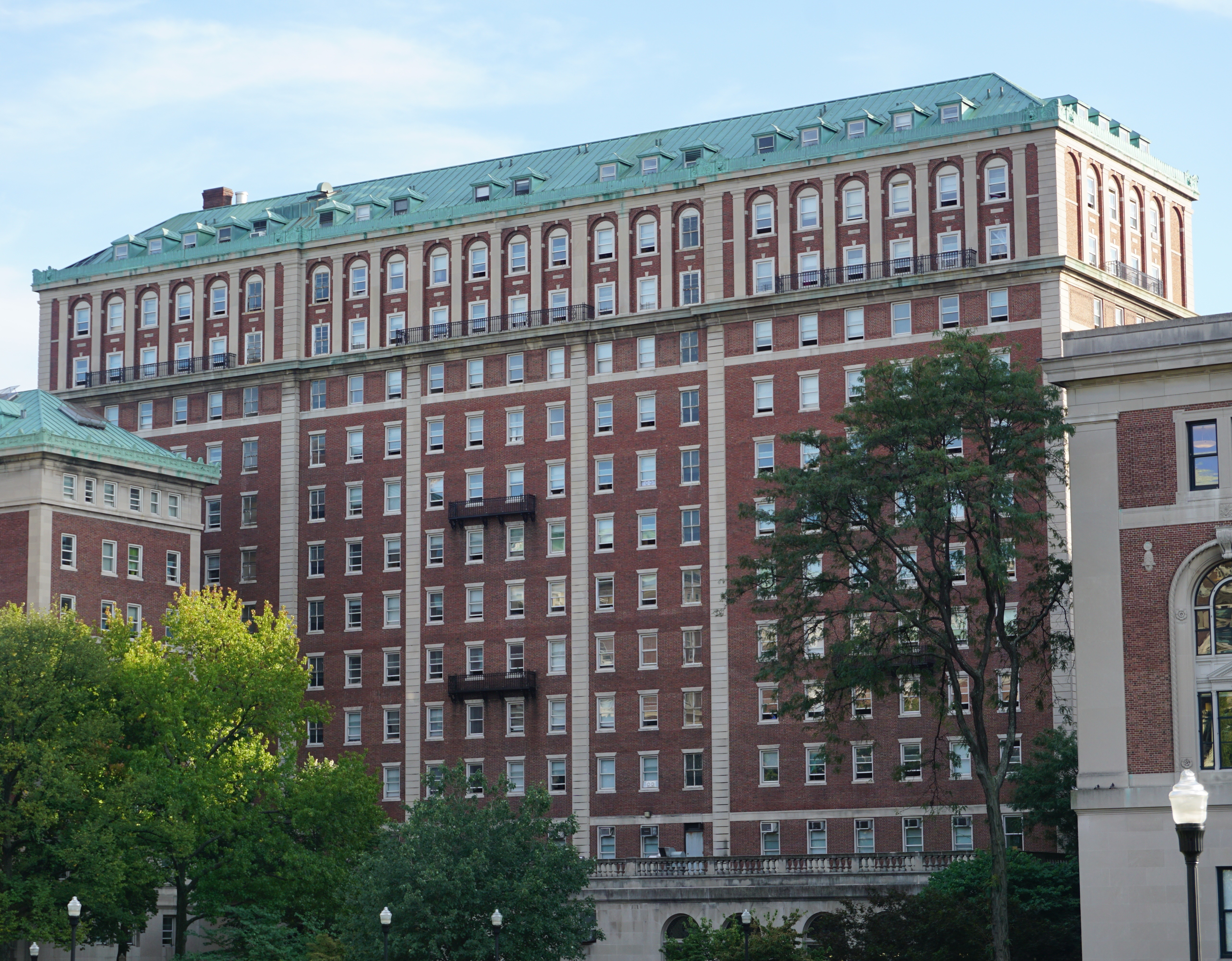
- Photograph of John Jay Hall, with Wallach Hall to the left and Butler Library to the right.
- Interactive map of the John Jay Hall area
- Former names: Students Hall

General information
- Location: 511 West 114th Street, New York City, New York
- Coordinates: 40°48′21.25″N 73°57′44.65″W
- Named for: John Jay
- Opened: 1927
- Owner: Columbia University

Technical details
- Floor count: 15
- Floor area: 148,292 square feet

Design and construction
- Architect: McKim, Mead, and White

John Jay Hall is a 15-story building located on the southeastern extremity of the Morningside Heights campus of Columbia University in New York City, on the northwestern corner of 114th St. and Amsterdam Avenue. Named for Founding Father, The Federalist Papers co-author, diplomat, and first Chief Justice of the United States Supreme Court John Jay (Class of 1764), it was among the last buildings designed by the architectural firm of McKim, Mead & White, which had provided Columbia's original Morningside Heights campus plan, and was finished in 1927.

The building includes freshman housing for students of Columbia College and the Fu Foundation School of Engineering and Applied Science; John Jay Dining Hall, the university's primary undergraduate dining facility; JJ's Place, an underground student quick service restaurant; the university's health services center; and an elegant wood-paneled lounge. Among its most prominent residents was the Spanish poet Federico García Lorca.

Unlike Carman Hall, the other exclusively freshman dormitory at Columbia, in which rooms are double-occupancy and arranged in clusters of two around a common bathroom as a suite, John Jay Hall's accommodations consist primarily of single rooms along narrow corridors, generally with three double-occupancy rooms per floor. Other dormitories housing undergraduate freshmen (but not exclusively so) include Wallach Hall, Hartley Hall, and Furnald Hall.

== History ==
=== "Skyscraper Dorm" ===
Following the First World War, significantly expanded enrollment at Columbia, combined with skyrocketing rents in Morningside Heights, prompted the construction of new dormitories at Columbia. Such a pressing need required a substantial expansion in housing space, and John Jay, the newest building for Columbia students, was built to nearly double the height of preexisting dormitories.

John Jay Hall was notably distinct from its institutional contemporaries on Morningside Heights. Johnson (now Wien) and Hewitt Halls were built to house female Columbia graduate students and Barnard College undergraduates, respectively. Both employed lighter wood finishing and "early-American" neo-colonial architecture, thought to reflect the comfortable, domestic environment women ought to be exposed to. In contrast, John Jay Hall featured dark wooden ceiling beams and panelling, as well as other details thought to render it a more "masculine" structure.

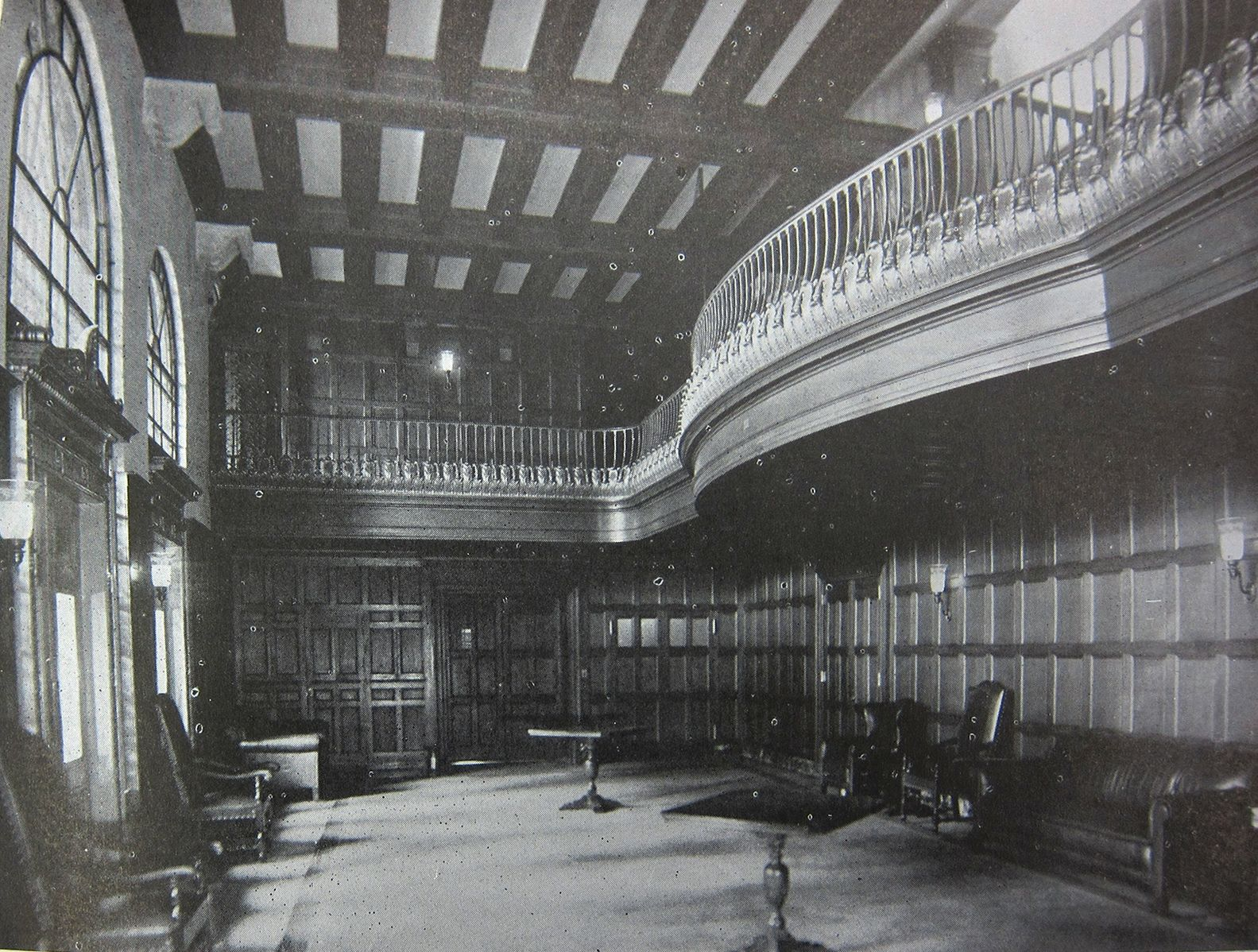
The John Jay lobby in 1927

In his 1919 annual report, University President Nicholas Murray Butler wrote that the new dorm would "make provision for student life and student organizations which are so important a part of the total educational influence that the university, and particularly the College, exerts." Originally known simply as Students Hall, the building therefore incorporated features, such as the dining hall and rathskeller (the Lion's Den Grill, now JJ's Place), as well as student club space on the fourth floor, meant to foster on-campus student life. It rapidly became the center of undergraduate life, housing the offices of campus publications such as the Jester and the Columbia Daily Spectator. As humanist writer and Trappist monk Thomas Merton wrote of his Columbia experiences in The Seven Storey Mountain, "The fourth floor of John Jay Hall was the place where all the offices of the student publications, the Glee Club and the Student Board and all the rest were to be found. It was the noisiest and most agitated part of campus." John Jay also came to house dances, alumni receptions, and the holiday Yule Log lighting ceremony.

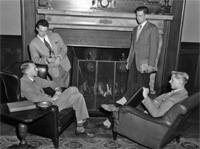
Students in the John Jay lounge in the 1950s

The first residents of what the New York Times had deemed the "Skyscraper Dorm", however, were agitated by its unreliable elevator service. Their irritation was expressed in a Times story headlined "Stair-climbing Stirs Columbia Students". Graffiti on one elevator noted "a fellow dropped dead from old age waiting for this elevator". Elevator service in the building remains faulty to this day.

=== USS John Jay ===
During the Second World War, John Jay served as quarters for U.S. Navy midshipmen and was run, for training purposes, as if it were a naval ship, referred to as the "USS John Jay". When midshipman desired to enter the building, he would have to say to their superiors "request your permission to come aboard, sir".

=== 1967 Protest ===
John Jay Hall was the site of violent anti-Vietnam War protest led by the vice-chairman of the Columbia University Chapter of the SDS, Ted Gold. Over 300 protesters followed Gold into the lobby of John Jay, where they confronted the recruiting efforts the U.S. Marines had mounted there. After the protesters came under attack by right-wing students, Gold urged a retreat in order to avoid further conflict. After regrouping at the West End bar near campus, sociology professor and SDS professor Vernon Dibble invoked the skirmish inside the building to rally the dejected students. "You let them push you out of John Jay Hall today. You have to go back there again tomorrow to keep your credibility as a radical student group," he insisted.

The scuffle in John Jay Hall induced university President Grayson L. Kirk to issue a statement of new school policy: "Picketing or demonstrations may not be conducted within any University Building." Nevertheless, the 1967 events in John Jay were merely the precursor to the much larger crisis surrounding the protests of 1968, in which many other buildings, notably Hamilton Hall, were occupied by striking students.

=== Renovations ===
In March 2022, the student lounge of John Jay was renamed after Walter and Shirley Wang, son and daughter-in-law of Taiwanese business magnate Wang Yung-ching, following the two's $10 million donation to improve undergraduate social spaces on campus.

== Notable residents ==
- Federico García Lorca (1929–1930), Spanish poet, wrote that “my room in John Jay is wonderful. It is on the 12th floor of the dormitory, and I can see all the university buildings, the Hudson River and a distant vista of white and pink skyscrapers. On the right, spanning the horizon, is a great bridge under construction, of incredible grace and strength.”
- John Berryman, Pulitzer Prize-winning poet; once reported that he was knocked cold by a bottle that was tossed in through an open John Jay window.
- David Paterson, Governor of New York
- Julia Stiles (2000–2001), actress, starred in Save the Last Dance and Mona Lisa Smile
- Max Minghella (2005–2006), actor, starred in Syriana and Art School Confidential
- Spencer Treat Clark (2006–2007), actor, starred in Gladiator, Mystic River, and Unbreakable.
- Jake Gyllenhaal (1998–1999), actor, known for his work in Donnie Darko, Brokeback Mountain, Zodiac, and Nightcrawler.
- Joseph Gordon-Levitt, actor, known for his work in The Walk, Inception, Snowden
- Katori Hall, American playwright and winner of the Pulitzer Prize for Drama in 2021
- Sha Na Na (1963–1968), rock group. Co-founders George Leonard (1963–1967) and Robert Leonard (1967–68), singer/composer Scott Simon (1966–67), and manager Ed Goodgold (1964–65) all resided in John Jay.
- Jim McMillian (1965–1966), Los Angeles Lakers star, replaced Elgin Baylor at forward, led Lakers to 33 game win streak and NBA championship (avg 19.1/ game in playoffs).
- Punch Sulzberger, publisher of The New York Times
- Philip Springer, American composer known for writing the song Santa Baby
- Cristina Teuscher, Olympic swimmer and gold medalist
- Victor Cha, American presidential advisor and Korea specialist
- John D'Emilio, professor of women's and gender studies at University of Illinois Chicago
- Fiona Sze-Lorrain, writer, poet, musician
- Raamla Mohamed, television writer
- Thomas Lippman, journalist specializing in the Middle East
- Tom Kitt, Pulitzer Prize-winning composer and musician
