= Getty View Park =

City park in Los Angeles, California

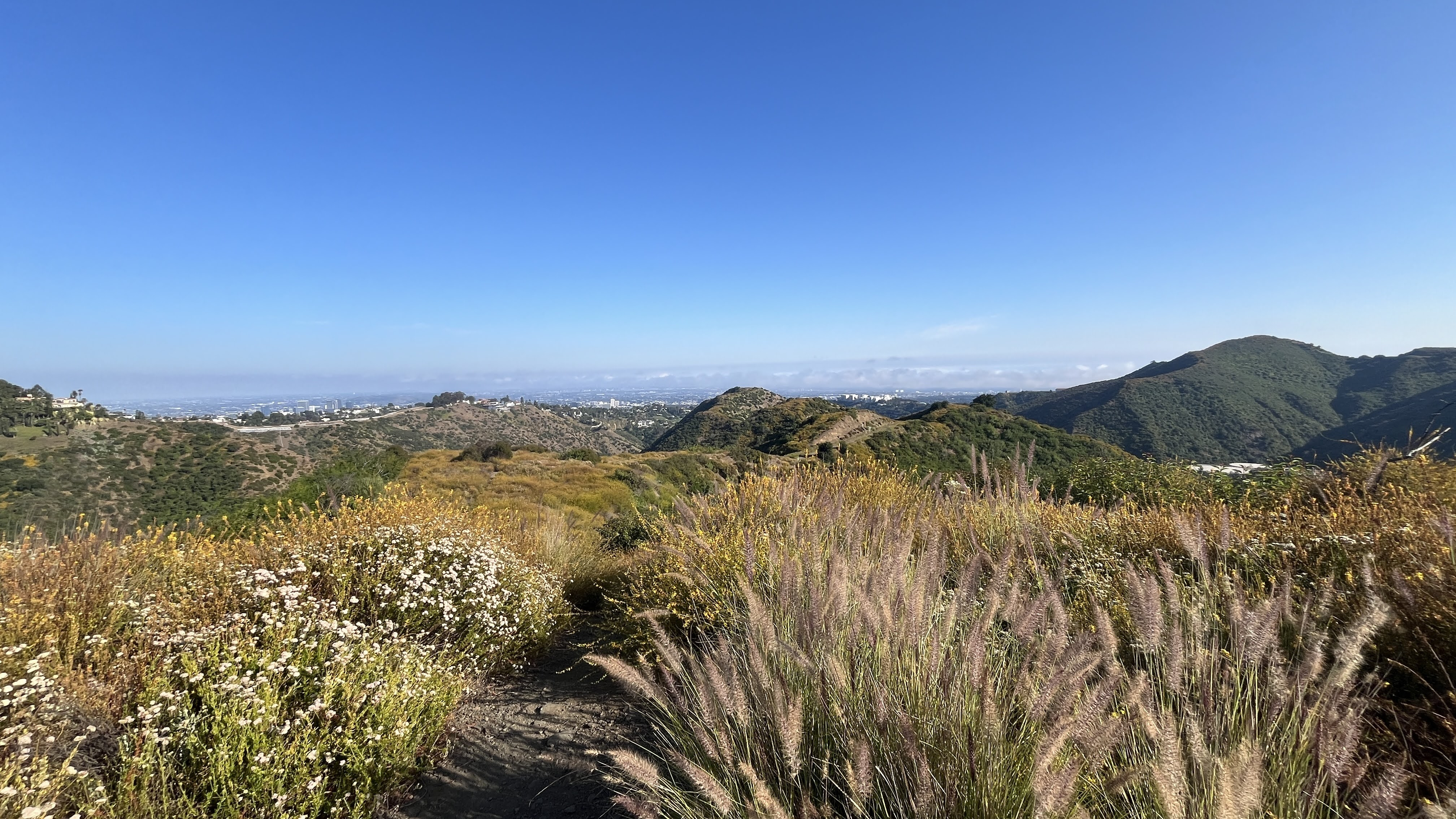
- The J. Paul Getty Museum is visible from Getty View Park
- Interactive map of Getty View Park
- Type: Urban park
- Coordinates: 34°05′55″N 118°28′24″W
- Open: All year

Getty View Park is a public municipal park located on the east side of Sepulveda Pass in the Santa Monica Mountains, in Los Angeles, California. The J. Paul Getty Museum is visible from the ridgeline in the park.

The park is managed by the Santa Monica Mountains Conservancy (SMMC).

== Activities ==
The park is a popular area for hiking, dog walking, running, and mountain biking, and is one of the closest hiking trails to UCLA's campus. The trailhead is located at the terminus of the southern portion of Casiano Road in the Bel Air neighborhood.

== See also ==
- Santa Monica Mountains National Recreation Area
- Santa Monica Mountains
