= Los Angeles Center for Enriched Studies =

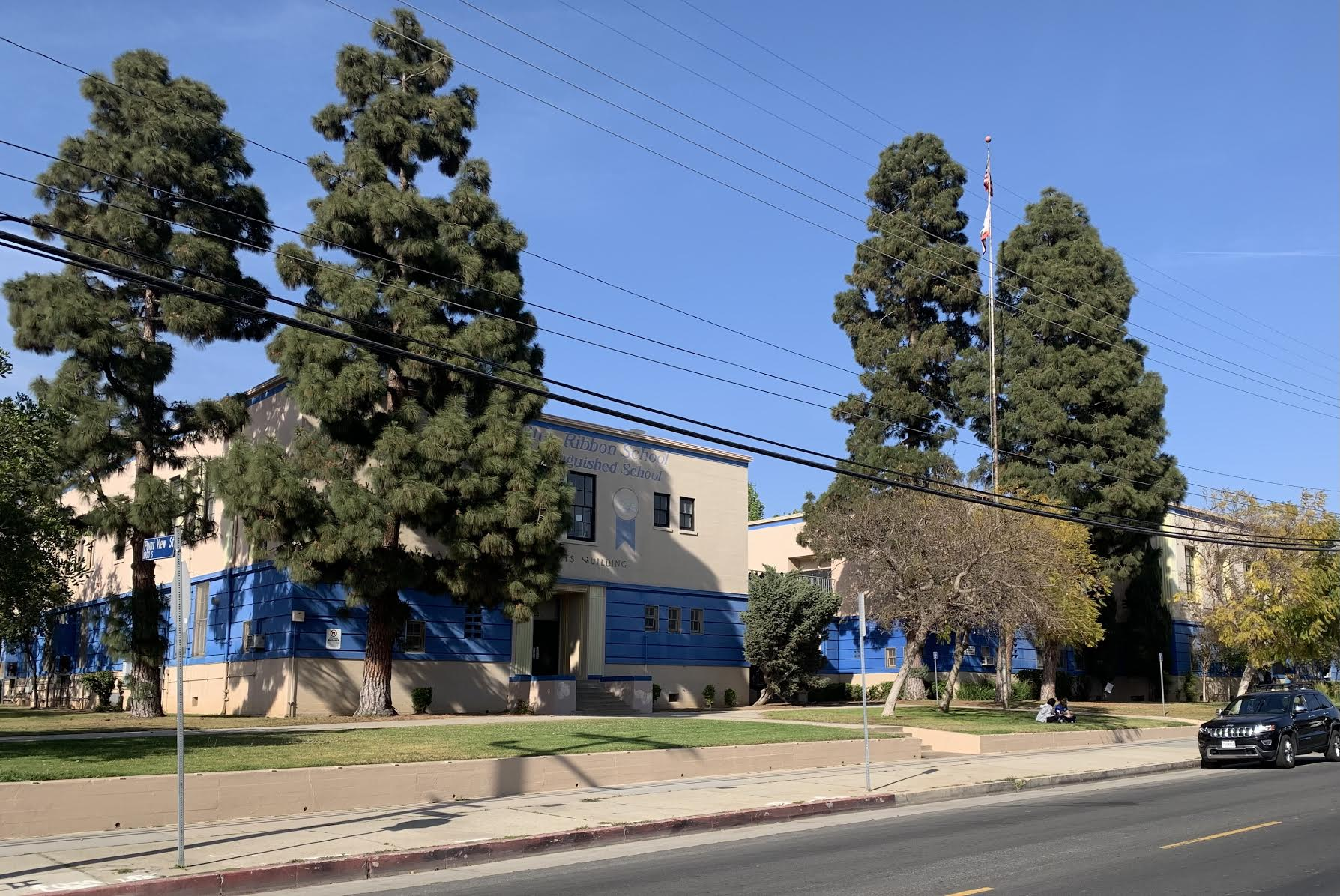

Location
- 5931 W. 18th Street; Los Angeles, California 90035; United States; 34.043605°N 118.371764°W

Information
- Former name: Center for Enriched Studies (without the "LA")
- School type: Public, Magnet, College-prep Alternative Schools of Choice
- Motto: In pursuit of excellence
- Established: September 1977
- School district: Los Angeles Unified School District
- Principal: Kimberly Lesure
- Faculty: 64.51 (FTE)
- Grades: 6–12
- Gender: Coeducational
- Enrollment: 1,670 (2018-19)
- Student to teacher ratio: 25.89
- Campus type: Urban
- Colors: Blue, White
- Athletics conference: CIF Los Angeles City Section
- Mascot: Randy the Unicorn
- Team name: Unicorns
- Accreditation: WASC
- Newspaper: LACES untied
- Website: www.lacesmagnetschool.org
- Information is from the 2014-15 school profile

The Los Angeles Center for Enriched Studies (LACES) is a public university preparatory secondary school located on 18th Street between La Cienega Boulevard and Fairfax Avenue in the Faircrest Heights district of Los Angeles, California, on the former site of Louis Pasteur Middle School.

LACES, which serves grades 6 through 12, is a part of the Los Angeles Unified School District (LAUSD). The current principal of LACES is Kimberly Lesure. LACES is a magnet school (the first in LAUSD) and enrolls students from the entire district (selected by a weighted lottery process), many of them coming to school by bus. Students are encouraged to take multiple Advanced Placement Courses, and all students are required to take at least one, AP World History, in 10th grade. The school has one of the highest API index ratings in LAUSD. In 1998, Los Angeles magazine described LACES as "the patriarch of all LAUSD magnets" with "a waiting list stretching into infinity."

The school has been named as a California Distinguished School and a National Blue Ribbon School. LACES is frequently ranked among the top high schools in the nation, according to various measures. LACES has consistently ranked high in the Challenge Index rankings created by Washington Post columnist Jay Mathews. In 2003, it was ranked 11th in the nation among public schools. This ranking was devised by calculating the total number of Advanced Placement courses taken by the graduating class and dividing it by that class. In California, LACES ranked number 17. In 2014, LACES ranked first on the Challenge Index among all schools (public and private) in Los Angeles, 5th in California, and 41st nationally. Also in 2014, U.S. News & World Report noted LACES as a "Gold Medal" school, ranking first among LAUSD schools, 19th in the state, and 112th in the nation.

== Academics ==
As of 2019 LACES offers 26 AP courses which include but are not limited to AP Studio Art, AP Computer Science, AP English Language and Composition, AP English Literature and Composition, AP French, AP Japanese, AP Human Geography, AP American Government, AP Macroeconomics, AP Microeconomics, AP Psychology, AP U.S. History, AP World History (required for all 10th graders), AP Seminar and AP research (2 year commitment), AP Calculus AB and BC, AP Statistics, AP Biology, AP Chemistry, AP Environmental Science, and AP Physics.

LACES offers the 4 following Languages: Spanish, French, Japanese, and Korean.

LACES has many electives such as Foods (cooking and nutrition), Exploration in Science (middle school), ceramics, photography, computer science, film, art, band, jazz, and choir.

Additionally, every 9th grader is required to take ethnic studies and every 6th grader is required to take academic literacy.

== Student life ==
LACES has 7 periods and follow an odd-even schedule, students go to their odd-numbered classes on day 1 and on day 2 students go to their even day classes with 7th period being every day except Tuesday. The students repeat this schedule for the rest of the year unless interfered with by holidays or special events.

The school also has over 75 student led clubs. LACES is home to several notable clubs, including but, not limited to, the Change a Life Club, Liberty in North Korea Club, and their Speech and Debate Club.

The school also has a class called Leadership. A program where a select group of students help the school by setting up school events such as Campus Cleanups and give announcements to the students during Homeroom.

Every Halloween the school has a carnival where the students are let out early and there is a miniature fair held around the student store where different clubs can sale food and snacks to the student body. Leadership also sets up a Haunted House in the school Auditorium for the students.

== History ==
LACES was founded as the "Center for Enriched Studies" (minus the "LA") in September 1977 as the first magnet school in the Los Angeles Unified School District. It was the first school created as part of the District's voluntary integration program. The founding principal was David Peha. In the 1977–78 school year, the school was housed in rented classroom space at Wilshire Boulevard Temple. It had an enrollment of about 450 students in grades 4 through 8. However, the Temple building did not meet LAUSD earthquake safety standards, so the following year, 1978–79, the school was relocated to an unused building on the Hamilton High School campus. It also added the 9th grade.

Starting in the 1979–80 school year, the school was moved, this time to a closed Catholic school campus at Pico and Arlington in Midtown Los Angeles which the LAUSD purchased. The original classroom building at the Catholic school was demolished and classroom bungalows were installed. LACES continued to add a grade level until reaching the 12 grade in the 1981–82 school year. The first graduating class of LACES was in June 1982.

LACES remained at the Pico and Arlington site until moving to its current site, the former Louis Pasteur Junior High School, after the school board voted in 1986 to close Pasteur. The Pico and Arlington site have now been used by Pio Pico Elementary and Middle School since 1987.

LACES was renovated between the years of 1995–2004 with a new gymnasium. The new gym includes an Olympic size pool, full weight room, locker rooms, and an indoor gym. The school was also enhanced with a new football field, tennis courts, and other physical education facilities. These changes had been discussed and hoped for since the early 1990s. Construction on an elevator for the language arts building started in the fall of 2008 and was completed in the fall of 2014.

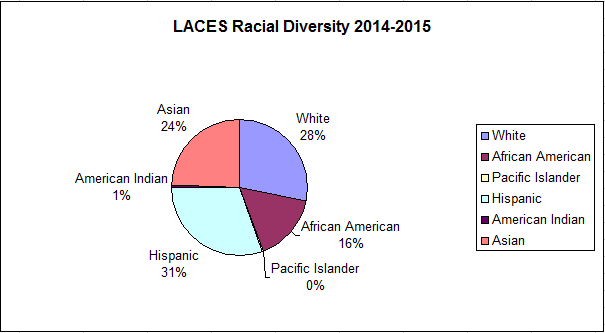
Student racial statistics for year 2014–2015

In 2010, the NBC reality show School Pride chose LACES to be the subject of an episode. The show's producers and sponsors provided landscaping and repainting (drawing criticism from some who thought that the bright blue and yellow exterior resembled an IKEA store) as well as makeovers for music and art rooms, the auditorium, and the culinary arts kitchen. The entire school was later renovated and painted from yellow and blue, to white and blue.

In June 2011, students vandalized the school, putting manure in the buildings, "soaping" the ponds, and spray-painting on a gym wall. The damage was estimated at $2,000.

In 2013, LACES received a Gaston Caperton Inspiration Award from the College Board, in recognition of the school's efforts to expand low-income students' access to higher education opportunities.

In 2018, 2 new science rooms were added to the south side of the blue building. They added new sinks, tables, better lighting, and more whiteboards. On the outside, they have also added new lockers and a water fountain that has been shut off since 2018.

On March 14, 2018, students came to the front lawn of the school during nutrition to participate in the Nationwide wide walkout against gun violence after the Stoneman Douglas Highschool shooting. The students were meant to stay on the field but eventually made their way to Fairfax Avenue.

=== Community Magnet School ===
Community Magnet School, an arts and humanities magnet primary school, was located, since its founding in 1977, in an area within the Los Angeles Center for Enriched Studies campus for a period of around 25 years. By October 2002 Community Magnet had moved to its new location in Bel-Air.

== Sports ==
During the 2013–2014 school year, LACES Boys and Girls volleyball both won the Los Angeles City Section Division 3 championship, while Boys and Girls Basketball won the Los Angeles City Section Division 4 championship. Boys volleyball, the no. 3 seed, beat the no. 1 seed Rancho Dominguez Preparatory School, 3–0. Boys Basketball, the no. 3 seed, beat Rancho Dominguez Prep, the no. 1 seed, 49-37. Both games were played at the Roybal Learning Center.

From 2011–2015, the LACES Girls Soccer team created a name for itself in Los Angeles, winning three Division III Los Angeles city championships in 4 years, overcoming bitter rivals Northridge Academy and Port of Los Angeles High School. In 2015, they finished as California Regional semifinalists. The team was led by Emma Katz, Raleigh Lemiere-Barnes, Jackie Schaeffer, and Aunika Ortiz, all of whom joined the varsity team as freshmen.

Baseball also has had a great impact on LACES, with five championships in six years. Coach Alexis Lopez took the 2013 and 2015 Varsity team to two LA City CIF Section Championships. Mathew Kanfer (now at Pepperdine) was the MVP for the 2015 team.

The boys' tennis team made the semi-finals in 2019 and a 2-time state-ranked player, Zac Brodney who won the CIF all-city championship in 2015 & 2016, coached by Darryl Sher who is also the Computer Science teacher at LACES Magnet.

Other physical sports include cross country, golf, water polo, soccer, swimming, and track and field.

In 2018, the students took an online vote to determine which video-game would be played if the school ever got into esports. In 2020, they created teams for the video games Rocket League, League of Legends, and Smite.

== Notable people ==
LACES has enrolled students such as Leonardo DiCaprio (who attended LACES for several years before transferring to John Marshall High School), Christopher Cabaldon, Quinn Cummings, Marques Houston, Shane West, David Arquette, Patricia Arquette, David Ayer, Chanda Prescod-Weinstein, Portia Doubleday, and (briefly) Mila Kunis.
