= Shirley Wang =

American philanthropist and entrepreneur

- Education: University of California at Los Angeles (BA); Columbia University (MBA)
- Occupations: Account executive, businesswoman, philanthropist
- Known for: The Walter and Shirley Wang Foundation, Plastpro, Inc.
- Spouse: Walter Wang
- Children: 3
- Relatives: Wang Yung-ching (father-in-law)

Shirley Wang is an American businesswoman and philanthropist. She is the co-founder of The Walter and Shirley Wang Foundation, a philanthropic organization. She is also the founder and CEO of Plastpro, Inc., a leading fiberglass door manufacturer founded in Los Angeles in 1994.

== Early life and education ==
Wang earned her Bachelor of Arts degree in communications and international business at the University of California, Los Angeles, in 1990 and earned her M.B.A. at Columbia Business School in 1993. From 1990 to 1991, Wang worked as an account executive for J. Walter Thompson Advertising, where she managed client accounts including Borden Foods and Chivas Regal. She then worked as an account executive for Citigroup from 1993 to 1994.

== Business career ==
In 1994, Wang founded Plastpro, Inc., a millwork products importer, manufacturer, and distributor that specializes in fiberglass doors.

In 2005, Plastpro, Inc. opened the world's first fully automated millwork manufacturing facility, a 300,000-square-foot factory in Ashtabula, Ohio, in the United States. The plant can produce up to one million finished doors per year.

== Philanthropy ==
In July 2016, Wang was appointed the first Asian-American woman to chair the UCLA Foundation Board, and has served on the UCLA Board of Directors since 2008. She is likewise a member of the executive committee for the Centennial Campaign for UCLA, a UCLA Foundation board that raises money for student scholarships and fellowships, which raised $5.49 billion and counting. Wang has served on numerous other boards including the Boards of Directors of both Facing History and Ourselves and the Preferred Bank (PFBC). In 2019, Wang's company, Plastpro, Inc., donated $100,000 toward an endowment at Glenbeigh Hospital for addiction.

Alongside her husband Walter, Wang is co-founder of the Walter and Shirley Wang Foundation. The foundation has supported various philanthropic initiatives in the realms of education, poverty reduction, assistance to domestic violence victims, Asian immigrant welfare, cancer research, and AIDS research and advocacy. The couple are members of the Committee of 100 (C-100). Wang and her husband are trustees of the U.S. Olympic Committee and also serve on the Board of the Los Angeles Olympic Committee 2028.

Shirley and Walter Wang donated to UCLA to establish an endowment to support both students from middle-income families and students studying abroad. At UCLA, the foundation endowed the first academic chair on U.S.-China relations and Chinese American studies in the United States, as well as a chair for Drug Discovery at the university. One of Shirley Wang's first major gifts to UCLA, her alma mater, was an endowment in partnership with the China Institute to send teachers to China. The couple also funded Wang Hall at the Harvard-Westlake School in Los Angeles, providing the lead donation for the renovation of the Harvard Westlake Humanities and Art Building. Wang serves as the chair of the Education Committee and is a member of the Board of Trustees of Harvard-Westlake School.

The Wangs were prominent supporters of the Drug Enforcement Administration Foundation and helped bring the DEA Museum to the California Science Center in Los Angeles to educate the public on illegal drugs and trafficking. The Wangs also established an endowed chair at the Cedar Sinai Medical Center for Pediatric Surgery to fund novel research in pediatric surgery, as well as assist underprivileged children in need of surgery. The Walter and Shirley Wang Foundation donated $250,000 to found an Outward Bound Center for underprivileged youth in New York, New York.

In the wake of the COVID-19 global pandemic, Plastpro, Inc. and JM Eagle donated surgical masks to Ohio facilities local to the Plastpro, Inc. factory. The Wangs donated $1 million to the Mayor's Fund of Los Angeles, as well as supplies for the creation of face shields for use at Cedars Sinai Medical Center and the Innovation Lab at UCLA.

In October 2020, Wang was elected to her alma mater Columbia University's board of trustees. Wang also sits on the college's Parent Leadership Council.

In March 2022, Wang and her husband donated $10 million to Columbia to enhance undergraduate social life in John Jay Hall, Wallach Hall, and Alfred Lerner Hall. She also donated $1 million to fund a passageway linking the two new buildings on Columbia Business School's new campus in Manhattanville.

In 2022, as sponsors, the Wangs heavily contributed to the doubling of the LPGA's LA Championship purse, which now sits at $3 million.

== See also ==
- List of Columbia University alumni
