= CMCS =

CMCS can refer to:

- Cambrian Medieval Celtic Studies
- Community Magnet Charter School
