= Hartley Hall =

Columbia University dormitory

Coordinates: 40°48′23.32″N 73°57′41.96″W

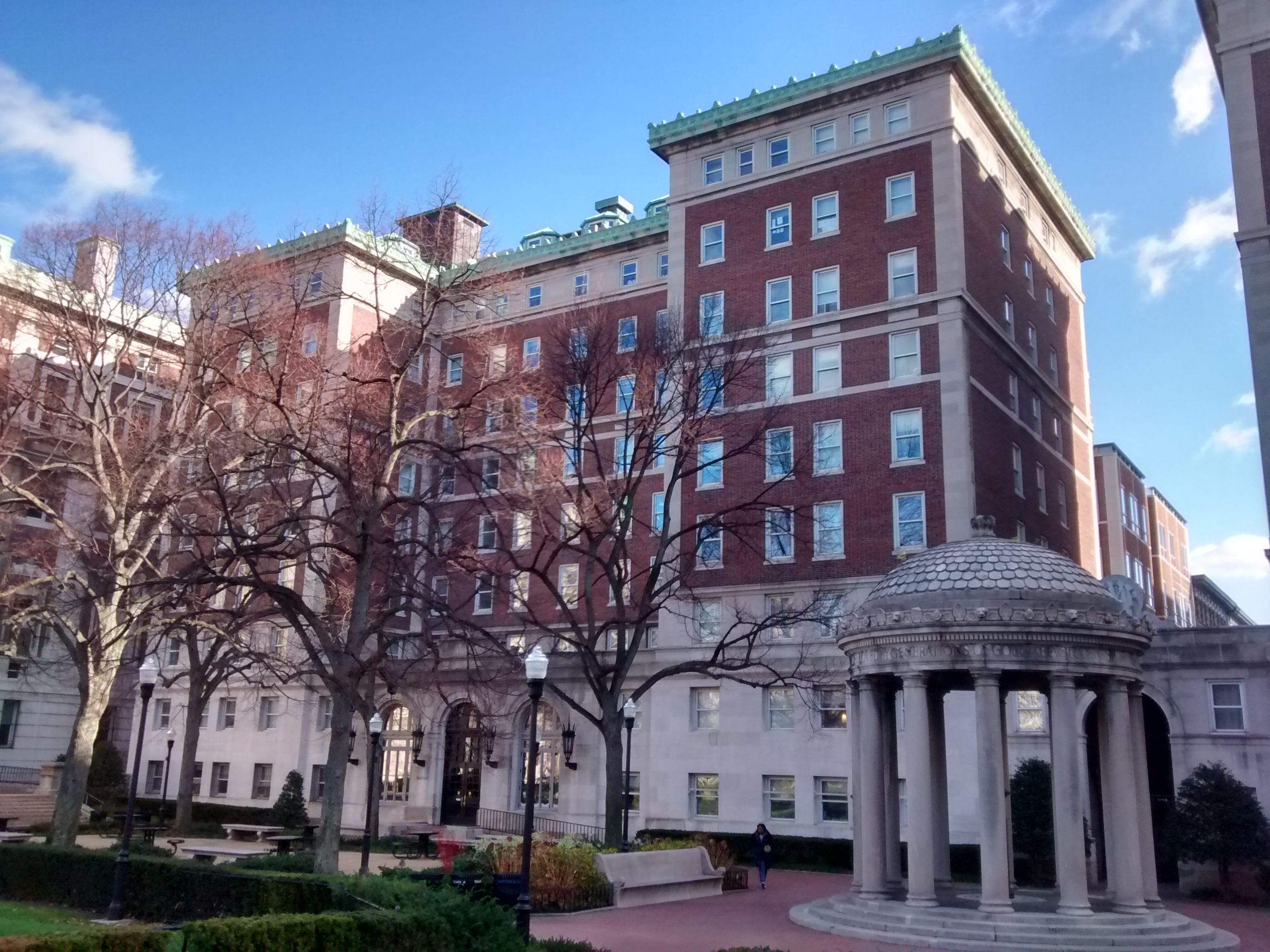
- Hartley Hall in 2015

General information
- Address: 1124 Amsterdam Ave, New York City, New York
- Named for: Marcellus Hartley
- Opened: 1904
- Owner: Columbia University

Technical details
- Floor count: 9

Design and construction
- Architect(s): McKim, Mead & White

Hartley Hall was the first official residence hall (or dormitory) constructed on the campus of Columbia University's Morningside Heights campus, and houses undergraduate students from Columbia College as well as the Fu Foundation School of Engineering and Applied Science. The building is named for Columbia alumnus Marcellus Hartley Dodge, who donated $300,000 for its construction shortly after his graduation. The building was meant as a memorial to his grandfather, Marcellus Hartley, the owner of Remington Arms, who died during Dodge's sophomore year and who bequeathed him the family fortune. Dodge hoped to create “the commencement of a true dormitory system" at Columbia.

Construction began on Hartley Hall in 1904 and it opened in tandem with Livingston Hall in 1905, welcoming students with its lobby of marble and oak. 200 students were housed in corridor-style rooms of various sizes. Lounges provided opportunities for social events such as teas with professors, although there was not yet an undergraduate dining hall on campus. Rooms of the period cost $3.30 per week, or $129 for the academic year, which, although more expensive than a roominghouse, ultimately allowed even poor students to afford berth there. University President Nicholas Murray Butler, who presided over the hall's opening, noted that "in the interest of true democracy," rooms were arranged to allow "the poorer student to live in the same building and the same entry with him who is better off, and so avoids the chasm between rich and poor living in separate buildings, of which there is so much complaint at Harvard."

Subsequently, the building became home, among others, to authors Allen Ginsberg and Jack Kerouac, who noted its cockroach problem.

Overhauled during a 1980s renovation, the dorm is organized into mostly two-story suites, where up to 15 students live in single and double rooms. The suites' common space includes kitchens, bathrooms and living/dining areas. Along with neighboring Wallach Hall, it is currently part of the Living and Learning Center (LLC), home to suite-style housing that intermingles all class levels and features interactive events designed to draw them together. An application process is required to obtain housing in either of the LLC dormitories. Hartley also houses Columbia's undergraduate housing office. A small kosher deli used to be housed on the main floor. It was moved in 2007 to John Jay Hall.

== Famous Residents ==
- Langston Hughes, writer, key figure of the Harlem Renaissance
- Jack Kerouac, writer, key figure of the Beat Generation
- Allen Ginsberg, poet, key figure of the Beat Generation
- Herbert Gold, novelist, member of the Beat Generation
- Timothée Chalamet, Academy Award-nominated actor
- Stephen Joel Trachtenberg, former President of George Washington University
- Terrence McNally, American playwright
- Robert Alter, professor at University of California, Berkeley, bible translator
- Christopher Dell, former American ambassador to Angola, Zimbabwe, Kosovo
- Phil Kline, American composer
