= 700 Nimes Road =

House on Nimes Road in the Bel Air district of Los Angeles

First edition (publ. Prestel Publishing)

700 Nimes Road is a house on Nimes Road in the Bel Air district of Los Angeles. It was the residence of the actor Elizabeth Taylor from 1982 until her death in 2011. The art photographer Catherine Opie created an eponymous photographic study of the house in 2011.

== The house ==
Opie described Taylor's house as "elegant but simple: a California Ranch–style house with pale blue and lush lavender carpets and a shimmering turquoise swimming pool". Taylor's biographer Alexander Walker described the house as "surprisingly modest" for someone as wealthy and influential as herself. Taylor bought the house in February 1982 for $2 million (equivalent to US6,672,414 in 2025) and lived there until her death in 2011. 700 Nimes Road had previously been the home of Nancy Sinatra, the first wife of Frank Sinatra, and had been sold by Mrs Sinatra to a property developer who gutted the house and added a second storey. On the ground floor of the house was the 'Trophy Room' where Taylor had her various awards and honours and photographs with other celebrities on display. The house was redecorated by Waldo Fernandez with white carpets and furniture in 1984 and with lavender upholstery in 2010. Taylor's bedroom was originally decorated by Fernandez in white fabric, 'printed with little purple and yellow flowers' from Porthault and redesigned in blue in 2010.

The garden was designed by Nicholas Walker, whom Taylor told of her ambition to 'duplicate an authentic English herbaceous border'. The lack of rain in Southern California led Walker to tell her of alternatives using plants from around the world. Walker said in an interview with Architectural Digest that "Her desire was for color and more color, all the time. "Let's be bold!"", a desire fulfilled by planting a variety of pansies. An annual Easter egg hunt took place in the garden alongside a petting zoo for children and occasion performance by dancers from Cirque du Soleil. Taylor’s daughter Liza Todd Tivey created a bronze sculpture of a calf for the garden, it was one of a pair with the other in the town square in Gstaad, in Switzerland.

700 Nimes Road was put up for sale after Taylor's death with a guide price of $8.6 million and was sold to Rocky Malhotra, an Indian businessman. The house was c.7,000 sq ft with 6 bedrooms and a staff suite at the time of its 2011 sale.

== The work ==
Opie's inspiration for the project was William Eggleston's photographic study of Graceland, the home of Elvis Presley. Opie took 3,000 images; 129 comprised the completed study. Opie did not intend to document Taylor's possessions, and instead approached the project by thinking of the relationship between textures and colours in her home. A television remote control guide lies amid the opulent objects and interior. Opie said that "Without the remote control guide, without the scuff of the red chair in the kitchen, without the trace, it would have been only archiving and cataloging and to make a portrait it has to be human; you have to think about humanity and the person has to be present". The extraordinary possessions that Taylor accused are documented by Opie including Taylor's many awards and memories of encounters with notable people and paintings by Amedeo Modigliani, Claude Renoir and Vincent van Gogh. Collector Daily noted the "relentless femininity of Taylor's taste" in the images contrasted with Opie's self declared "identity as a butch woman" in Opie's forward to 700 Nimes Road and Opie's "status as an ordinary mortal" in comparison to Taylor's stardom. Collector Daily concluded with the contrasting images of Opie's portrayal of the wealthy mundanity of Taylor's life with the lives of the iconic characters that Taylor portrayed on film. Collector Daily described the images as "Shot mainly in natural light, airy and pastel-laced, various and unforced" that illustrated Opie's nimble intelligence in solving the problem of documenting the personal space of a Hollywood legend" The project documents interior space in a "hermetic world" with no "axial views of the house" and "only a few outdoors images". The images are static and "full of silence" except for a shot of Taylor's cat walking across a row of Chanel pumps.

The book concludes with closeups of Taylor's possessions in tabled boxes prior to their sale at Christie's auction house recording the "systematic dismantling of a life, and not just any life". Opie never met Taylor, who died halfway through the six-month study in 2011. Opie found the project "overwhelming" and said that "...you're in Elizabeth Taylor's home and you don't want to piss anyone off; you want to represent her in a way that feels like an extension of the ability to think about portraiture other than an iconic image of Elizabeth Taylor the movie star". Opie felt that 700 Nimes Road "...represented [her passing] in small, quiet intimate ways because her death was intimate...Her funeral was just her family; it wasn't a big public funeral".

The monograph of 700 Nimes Road was published by Prestel with essays by writer Hilton Als, Taylor's personal assistant Tim Mendelson, magazine editor Ingrid Sischy, and Opie.
