= Naty Saidoff =

Israeli-born American businessman

- Born: 1954/1955; Israel
- Education: UCLA
- Occupations: Businessman philanthropist
- Spouse: Debra Saidoff
- Children: 2

Naty Saidoff (born 1954/1955) is an Israeli-born American diamond dealer, real estate investor and philanthropist. Born in Israel, he grew up on a kibbutz and emigrated to the United States for college. He started his career as a diamond dealer. He is the founder of Capital Foresight Investment, a real estate investment company with rental properties across the United States. He is a large property investor in Downtown Los Angeles. He supports pro-Israel non-profit organizations.

== Early life ==
Naty Saidoff was born in 1954 or 1955 in Israel. He grew up on a kibbutz.

Saidoff graduated from the University of California, Los Angeles (UCLA), where he earned a bachelor's degree in Economics.

== Career ==
Saidoff started his career as a diamond dealer.

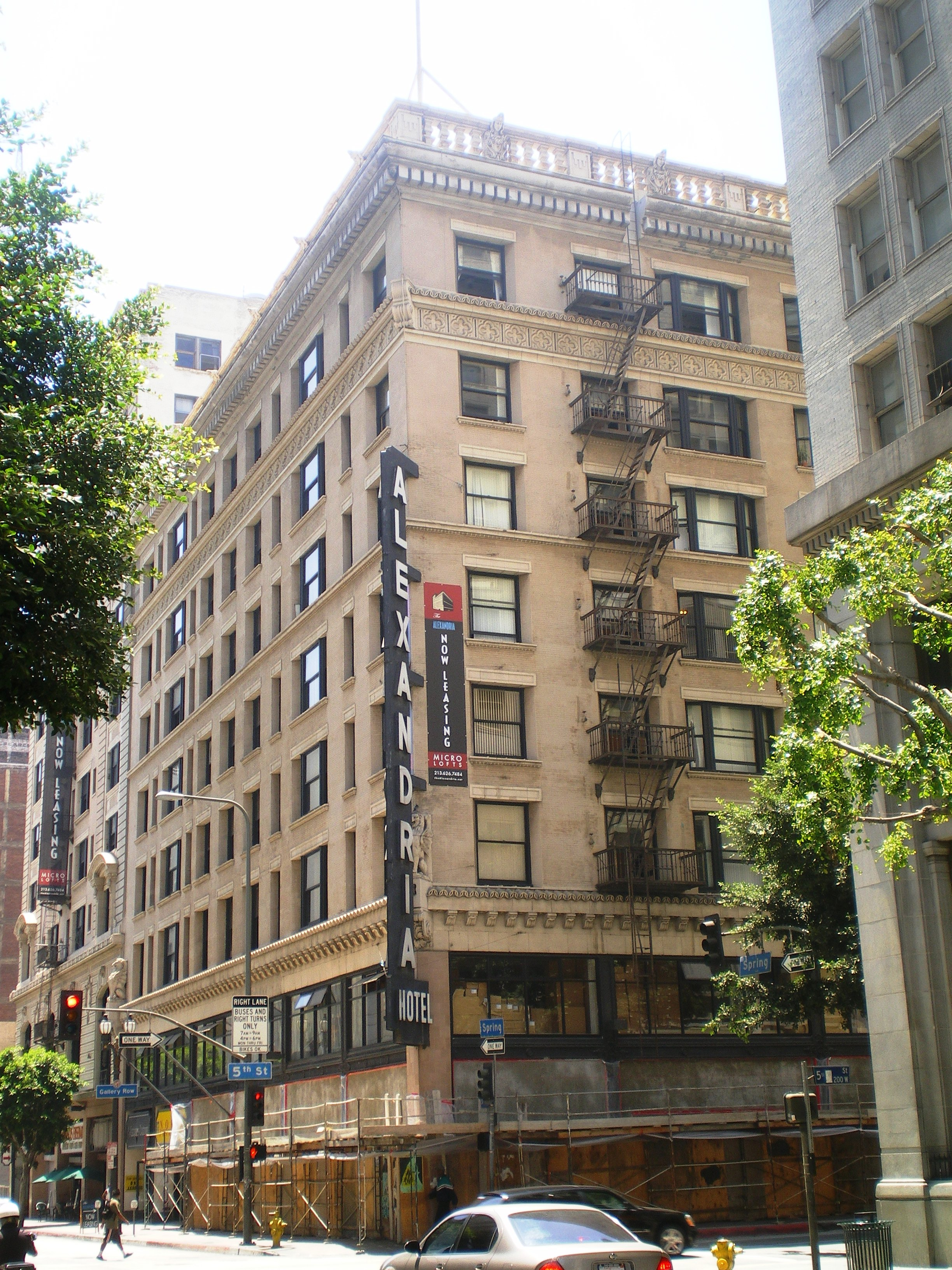
The Hotel Alexandria in Downtown Los Angeles, prior to its restoration.

Saidoff is the founder of Capital Foresight Investment, a real estate investment company. He is the owner of rental properties in Denver, Colorado, Austin, Texas, Orange County, California as well as Long Beach, California, where he acquired the Walker Building with Bill Lindborg in 1999 and turned the derelict hotel into a residential building.

As an investor in Bristol 423, Saidoff acquired the historic Leland Hotel, the King Edward Hotel, the Hotel Alexandria and the Baltimore Hotel with Izek Shomof and his son, Eric Shomof, in 2012. Additionally, they acquired the Santa Fe Lofts at Sixth Street and Main Street, the Binford Lofts at 837 Traction Avenue, the Title Insurance Building at 433 South Spring Street and its adjacent building at 419 South Spring Street, the Maxfield Building at 819 South Santee Street and the Capitol Garment Building at 217 East Eighth Street.

== Philanthropy ==
Saidoff supports pro-Israel advocacy non-profit organizations. In 2015, he stated, "I think the best way to be a Zionist is to live in Israel, and since I don’t, the second-best way is to be an activist and donate money and do what I do now."

Saidoff serves as a Vice President of StandWithUs while his wife serves on its board. The Saidoffs received the StandWithUs Honorary Award in 2003. Additionally, he serves on the board of the Israeli-American Council as well as on the national board of governors of the American Jewish Committee. The Saidoffs received the AJC Community Service Award in 2006. In 2014, Saidoff and his wife were invited to meet Pope Francis in Vatican City on an AJC delegation.

With his wife, Saidoff endowed the Debbie & Naty Saidoff Center, an Adult Degree Completion Program in San Antonio, Texas.

== Personal life ==
Saidoff and his wife, Debra, have a son, Joshua. They reside in Bel Air.
