= Bel-Air Bay Club =

Event venue and private beach club in Pacific Palisades, Los Angeles, California

- Location within the Los Angeles metropolitan area Location within California Location within the United States
- Address: 16801 Pacific Coast Highway
- Location: Pacific Palisades, California
- Coordinates: 34°02′25.4″N 118°32′45.1″W

Construction
- Opened: June 02, 1927; 99 years ago

Website
- belairbayclub.com

The Bel-Air Bay Club is both an event venue (Upper Club) and a private beach club (Lower Club) located in Pacific Palisades, Los Angeles, California.

The Upper Club, includes an ocean view and on-site accommodations available for private parties. The interior of the Bel-Air Bay Club Upper Club includes large windows, a fireplace, and iron chandeliers. The Bel-Air Bay Club is primarily used as a wedding, social (including a birthday party, graduation ceremony, memorial service/celebration of life or holiday party), and corporate event venue.

== History ==
Located in Pacific Palisades, the Bel-Air Bay Club was financed by one of the most well known developers of Los Angeles, Alphonzo Bell. Establishment of this club was part of a larger real estate project which contributed to the founding of the town of Bel Air, Los Angeles. Officially incorporated on 2 June 1927, the modern Bel-Air Bay Club exists as two separate facilities, divided by the Pacific Coast Highway. Bell designed the Upper Bel-Air Bay Club clubhouse specifically so visitors would have a view of the Los Angeles coastline.

== Design and layout ==
Bel-Air Bay Club (Upper Club) is a country club style wedding venue providing all-inclusive wedding accommodations to parties between 50-400 people in size. It also provides onsite wedding consultant services, catering, and valet parking to venue attendees. Wedding dates can be reserved between 3–18 months in advance, with weekend dates typically requiring the most advanced notice. Wedding arrangements can be customized to customer preferences, including food/beverage selection, event timeline, and preferred floor plan. A full-day buyout option is also available to parties who are planning time-intensive events.

== Accommodations ==
Bel-Air Bay Club is a Southern California, 1920's Mediterranean style mansion with various gardens and an ocean view. The venue's cliffside lawn with the ocean view is one of the common locations where couples choose to hold their wedding ceremonies. An outdoor Spanish-style courtyard patio is commonly used for receptions because of its fountain, fireplace, and lights. The venue's luxury-style Living Room is also commonly used for receptions and event gatherings.

== Food and dining ==
Executive chef Peter Edwards, who has over 20 years of culinary experience, customizes and provides unique meals and menus to venue attendees.
