= JM Eagle =

American corporation

JM Eagle is an American corporation and a manufacturer of plastic pipe. At its 22 plants in North America, the company manufactures polyvinyl chloride (PVC) and high-density polyethylene pipe for a variety of industries including utility, plumbing, electrical, natural gas, irrigation, potable water, drainage, and sewage.

== History ==
In 1982, Formosa Plastics purchased the eight plants comprising the plastic-pipe operations of Johns Manville to form J-M Manufacturing, headquartered in Livingston, New Jersey.

In November, 2005, Walter Wang acquired 100 percent of the company from Formosa Plastics. J-M Manufacturing grew to a 14-plant enterprise by 2007, when it acquired the second largest plastic-pipe manufacturer, PW Eagle. The company relocated its headquarters to Los Angeles in 2008.

=== Lawsuits ===
In 2006, JM Eagle, then known as J-M Manufacturing, faced a whistleblower lawsuit. In January 2006, an engineer accused JM Eagle of selling billions of dollars' worth of defective pipe to states and municipalities around the United States, and the company was sued under the federal False Claims Act. A Los Angeles jury found JM Eagle liable for failing to make 100 percent of its pipe, according to Underwriters Laboratories standards, though an Underwriters Laboratories engineer testified that the company never fell out of compliance during repeated audits. The whistleblower, John Hendrix, had been fired after a customer complained Hendrix had attempted bribery to favorably resolve a warranty claim.

Only two of the five municipalities suing in the first phase of the trial reported any defective pipe, and two others, the state of Nevada and Norfolk, Virginia, both admitted they continued to purchase JM products while aware of the allegations in the lawsuit. JM Eagle sued Phillips & Cohen for libel for post-verdict comments suggesting its products are dangerous and defective.

J-M Manufacturing was involved in a federal qui tam action brought on by various public entities, but while the lawsuit was pending law firm Sheppard Mullin Richter & Hampton went on to represent one of the public entities involved. Both clients had signed engagement agreements stating they had waived any such conflicts of interest, but the agreements did not disclose the specific conflicts, and Shepard did not advise either client of the conflicts. In August 2018, the California Supreme Court reversed a fee award that had been granted in favor of the law firm, maintaining that the firm's conflict of interest invalidated its entire agreement with J-M Manufacturing, including the arbitration clause, and thereby rendered its fee award a nullity.

== Philanthropy ==
JM Eagle participates in various philanthropic efforts, particularly where polyvinyl chloride (PVC) piping can help facilitate the acquisition of natural resources in underprivileged communities. In 2009, Columbia University's The Earth Institute worked with the United Nations and JM Eagle to create innovative water systems for over 300,000 people in Sub-Saharan countries, including Rwanda, Kenya, and Uganda.

JM Eagle donated 45,600 feet of PVC pipe to construct an 8.5-mile pipeline to facilitate the acquisition of clean water in Santa Cruz, Honduras.

JM Eagle has provided scholarships for young African students to assist in education through college and aided in clean water delivery, including irrigation and sanitation systems, in Northern Thailand, in the villages of Santisuk and Pateung. JM Eagle supports China's efforts to provide its entire population with clean water.
