= Robert Mountsier =

Author, journalist, and literary agent

Robert Mountsier (1888–1972) was an author, journalist and literary agent for writer D. H. Lawrence.

Mountsier, 1919 passport photo, with signature

== Personal life ==
Mountsier was born in Belle Vernon, Pennsylvania, on May 14, 1888, the son of Augustine R. Mountsier of Hilgay, England.

In 1905, Mounstier, as a high school student, placed second in a competitive examination to be accepted as a plebe in the U.S. Naval Academy at Annapolis, Maryland.

He graduated from the University of Michigan in 1909 and received a Ph.D. from Columbia University. In a 1910 passport application, he described himself as a "student and journalist." He was a resident of Livingston Hall on the Columbia campus.

In his later life he lived in Crestwood, New York, and died at the age of 84 on November 23, 1972, in a New York City nursing home. He was survived by siblings Carl Mountser, Mabel Mountser and Alathea Walker.

== Professional work ==
Mountsier joined the New York Sun as literary editor in 1910 and was aviation and automobile editor from 1914 to 1916. In the latter year, he was reporting from the Mexican border, and in World War I he was sent to Europe by the New York Herald. Afterward, he was employed by the Red Cross and was also with the American Relief Administration.

He was also the literary editor of Judge (magazine) in 1915 under the name A. Robert Mountsier.

Between 1916 and 1919 he was in England, France, Turkey and Armenia. In 1920 he returned to Europe on a commercial assignment to investigate business conditions "with special reference to the copper and brass industries."

After the war Mountsier returned to the Sun. In 1929 he covered a 140-day around-the-world voyage of the Hamburg-American Line Resolute. The Sun closed in 1950, and afterward he edited an automotive magazine, Old Timers for the Automobile Old Timers organization in New York City.

Mountsier was also the American literary agent for writer D. H. Lawrence, beginning in October 1920. Lawrence broke with his previous agent, J.B. Pinker, and replaced him with Mountsier in New York and Curtis Brown in London.

== Books ==
- Soldiers, Sailors and Marines
- Our Eleven Billion Dollars
