= The Westland School (Los Angeles) =

Coordinates: 34.129342°N 118.485992°W

Westland School

Location
- 16200 Mulholland Drive; Bel Air, Los Angeles, California; USA

Information
- Type: Private
- Established: 1949
- Grades: K - 6th
- Enrollment: 130
- Affiliation: Nonsectarian
- Website: Official Website

Westland School is a K-6 private elementary school in Los Angeles, California, founded in 1949. Westland is accredited by the California Association of Independent Schools (CAIS) through 2031, and is a member of the Western Association of Schools and Colleges (WASC).

== History ==
When Westland opened in 1949 it was the first progressive school on the West Coast, operating under the educational philosophy of John Dewey. One of the founders was child psychologist Marie H. Briehl. Students were encouraged to explore their subjects hands-on and were taken on numerous field trips to learn about the world firsthand. Many of the early students were the children of writers and actors under the "Hollywood blacklist", including Charlie Chaplin, Abraham Polonsky, and Ring Lardner, Jr.

The school opened with 13 students in a couple of rented rooms. It expanded in 1957 and moved to its current location in 1965, becoming the first school to locate in what has now developed into a major "institutional corridor" in the area of the Sepulveda Pass.

Today the school has about 130 students and an annual tuition of around $39,000. The students are divided into "groups" rather than grades, which may include children of varying ages.

== Legacy ==
The archives of the Westland School reside in the University Library at California State University, Northridge.
