= Israeli-American Council =

American pro-Israeli lobby organization

Israeli-American Council (IAC)
- ארגון הקהילה הישראלית-אמריקאית
- Formation: 2007
- Tax ID no.: 22-3951652
- Legal status: 501(c)(3) nonprofit organization
- Headquarters: Los Angeles, California
- Region served: United States
- Co-chairs: Avi Almozlino and Tal Shuster
- CEO: Elan Carr
- Website: www.israeliamerican.org

The Israeli-American Council (IAC; Hebrew: ארגון הקהילה הישראלית-אמריקאית) is an American nonprofit organization whose mission is to preserve and strengthen the Israeli and Jewish identities of future generations, strengthen the American Jewish community, and strengthen the relationship between citizens of the United States and the State of Israel.

== History ==
The Israeli Leadership Council (ILC) was founded in 2007 by Israel's Consul General, Ehud Danoch, and a group of Israeli and Israeli-American business leaders, including Adam Milstein and Shoham Nicolet. The first ILC event was held in July 2007, at the Beverly Hilton Hotel, with about 80 Israeli-American business leaders, featuring Los Angeles Mayor Antonio Villaraigosa and Danoch. The event was organized by Danny Alpert, Adam Milstein, Eli Tene, Steve Erdman, Naty Saidoff, Eli Marmour, and Shoham Nicolet following a meeting between Alpert and Danoch.

The ILC's first board was co-chaired by Alpert and Tene, and included Milstein, Erdman, Marmour, Saidoff, Shawn Evenhaim, Yossi Rabinovitz, and Nissan Pardo. Shoham Nicolet was asked to volunteer to lead the venture as the Founding Executive Director. They set the organization's "three pillars" of engagement: to strengthen future generations of Israeli-Americans, the American Jewish community and the State of Israel.

By 2008, ILC began receiving support from Beny Alagem, Leo David and Haim Saban. It held its first major event, "Live for Sderot", a celebrity gala with 1,800 attendees. The two presidential candidates, Barack Obama and John McCain, both sent videos expressing their support for the event.

The ILC held its first annual gala dinner in 2009, attended by hundreds of Israeli-Americans.

In 2011, ILC began funding Sifriyat Pijama B-America, a Hebrew language version of PJ Library. PJ Library is a nonprofit which sends children's book to Jewish families. The program was cancelled in 2016.

Sagi Balasha became ILC's first CEO in September 2011. ILC Care was launched in November. In April 2012, ILC launched the Celebrate Israel Festival to celebrate Israel's Independence Day.

In 2013, the ILC rebranded as the Israeli-American Council. Funded by Miriam and Sheldon Adelson, the organization launched an expansion plan to create regional councils across the United States. By summer 2014, the IAC had a staff of 60 people, an annual budget of $17.5 million and six regional offices.

By 2014, IAC Merkaz and IAC Shishi Israel were established, as were regional chapters in Boston, Florida, Las Vegas, and New York. In October 2014, Adam Milstein became the Chairman of the IAC, and Shoham Nicolet returned as the organization's CEO. Milstein served as chairman until 2019.

IAC has established several regional chapters since 2015. Those years also saw the launch of IAC Manhigut, IAC Act, and IAC Eitanim. By the end of 2018, IAC has 20 regional offices and more than 58 active communities.

== Funding ==
Major funders of IAC have included billionaire and pro-Israel philanthropist Sheldon Adelson, who contributed millions to the organization, and Haim Saban. Republican Adelson and Democrat Saban had appeared together to demonstrate that their efforts for Israel were bipartisan, but from 2015 Saban reduced his support over political differences.

== Israeli-American National Conference ==
In 2014, IAC began hosting annual national conferences, featuring American and Israeli politicians and business leaders. The conference has grown to become one of the largest Israel-related annual events.

The first national conference was held in November in Washington, D.C., and drew over 750 participants and speakers. During an on-stage discussion about the Palestinian issue between IAC's two megadonors, Saban and Adelson, the former insisted on the two-state solution to keep Israel both Democratic and Jewish. Adelson, in response, quipped "Israel isn't going to be a democratic state – so what?" A year, it was reported that Saban has ended his involvement in IAC, allegedly over political differences.

In 2017, the conference was held in Washington, D.C. Among the speakers were U.S. ambassador to the UN Nikki Haley, Israel's UN Representative Danny Danon, Israeli Education Minister Naftali Bennett, Israeli Deputy Foreign Minister Tzipi Hotovely, and Member of Knesset Merav Michaeli.

The fifth IAC National Conference in 2018 was held in Florida with over 3,100 attendees. Speakers included Vice President Mike Pence, Senator Chuck Schumer (D-NY), House Democratic Leader, Nancy Pelosi (D-CA), Speaker of the Israeli Knesset Yuli Edelstein, Israel's Justice Minister Ayelet Shaked, and Israeli-American businessmen such as Marius Nacht and Maya Prosor.

U.S. President Donald Trump spoke at IAC's sixth national conference in December 2019. He claimed that some Jews "don't love Israel enough" and, addressing the audience of 4,000 Jews: "You're not going to vote for the wealth tax. Let's take 100 percent of your wealth away. No, no. Even if you don't like me – and some of you don't, some of you I don't like at all actually – and you're going to be my biggest supporters because you'll be out of business in about 15 minutes." While the audience cheered, some commentators claimed Trump's remarks were antisemitic.

== Israeli-American Coalition for Action ==
The Israeli-American Coalition for Action (IAC for Action, formerly the Israeli-American Nexus), founded in 2016, is the lobbying arm of IAC. Its focus issues include supporting economic collaboration between the United States and Israel, lobbying for anti-BDS laws to force government contractors to promise not to boycott Israel, and Iran which Israel sees as a threat.
