= Sepulveda Pass =

Mountain pass in Los Angeles County, California, United States

- Paseo de Sépulveda
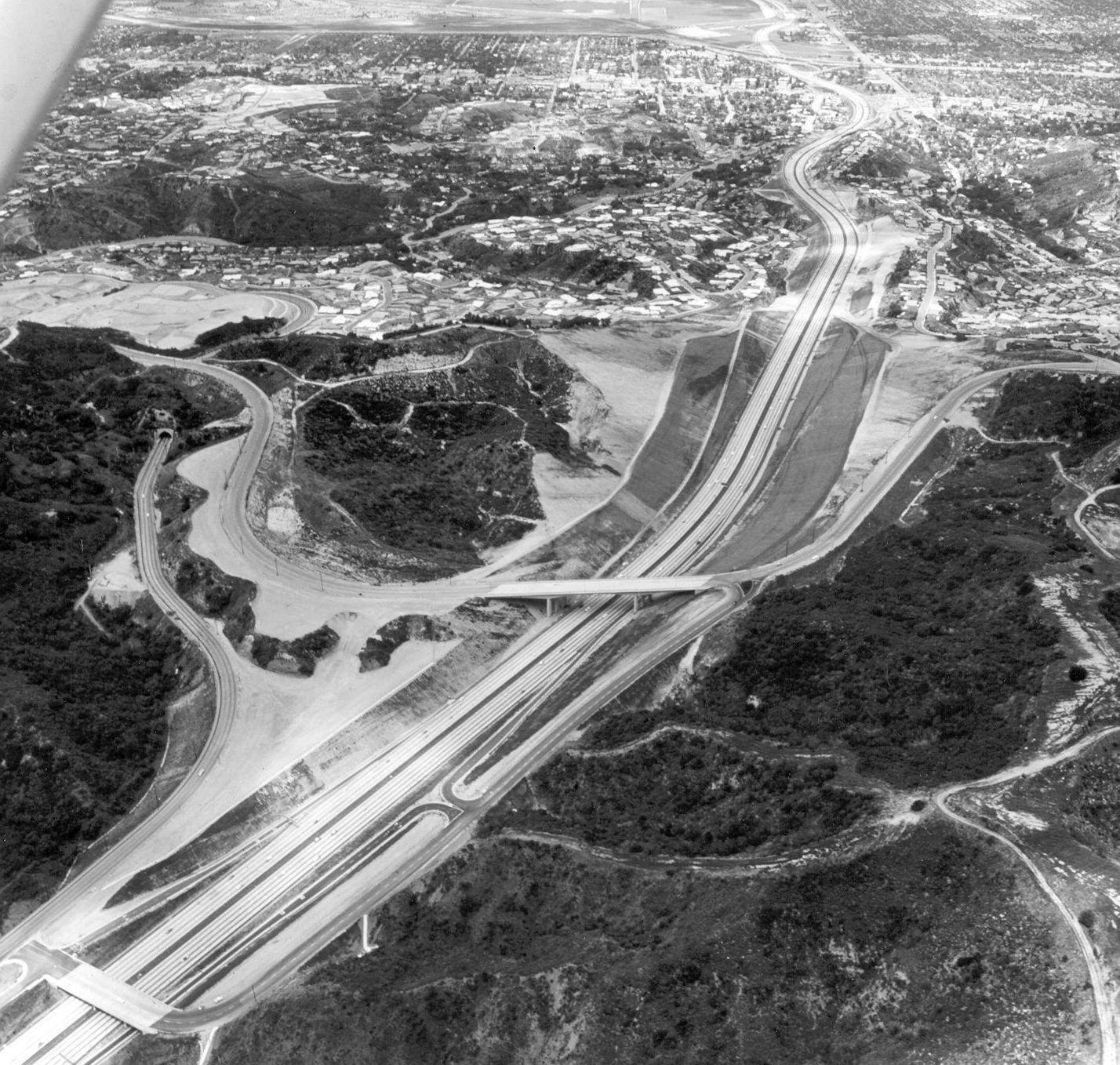
- I-405 over the Sepulveda Pass, 1963
- Interactive map of Sepulveda Pass
- Elevation: 1,130 ft (340 m)
- Traversed by: I-405

Location
- Location: Los Angeles, California, United States
- Range: Santa Monica Mountains
- Coordinates: 34°07′38″N 118°28′30″W

Sepulveda Pass (elevation 1,130 feet (344 m)) is a low mountain pass through the Santa Monica Mountains in Los Angeles. It is named after the Sepúlveda family of California, a prominent Californio family that owned the land where the pass lies.

It connects the Los Angeles Basin to the San Fernando Valley via the San Diego Freeway (I-405) and Sepulveda Boulevard. The crossing experiences heavy traffic (over 330,000 cars a day) on a regular basis, commonly experiencing major traffic slowdowns lasting hours.

I-405 was widened by LA Metro, the county's transportation authority. The project took three years to complete and concluded in December 2016. Additionally, funding has been secured to construct an expansion to Los Angeles's public transportation system through the Sepulveda Pass in the form of a new subway line.

The Sepulveda Pass on Interstate 405 begins just south of Ventura Boulevard in the San Fernando Valley, climbing to just south of Mulholland Drive, then descending to just north of Sunset Boulevard, where I-405 and Sepulveda Boulevard enter the Brentwood and Westwood areas of West Los Angeles. Northbound I-405 has five lanes and a carpool lane (plus a seventh as the Ventura exit is approached), while southbound I-405 has four lanes plus a carpool lane (although on the ascending portion there is a climbing lane).

Sepulveda Boulevard has two lanes in each direction and runs west of I-405 until the middle of the pass, where it crosses under and runs east of the freeway.

Bel Air Presbyterian Church, founded in 1956, opened its church on Mulholland Drive in 1960. Beginning with The Westland School in 1965, a number of other educational and cultural institutions have located in the vicinity of Sepulveda Pass, creating an "institutional corridor" as an exception to the Mulholland Scenic Parkway Specific Plan's general prohibition of such development along the crest of the mountains. The institutions along Mulholland Drive now also include Stephen S. Wise Temple, American Jewish University, the Skirball Cultural Center, Milken Community High School, The Mirman School, Berkeley Hall School, and The Curtis School. To the south is the large campus of the Getty Center.

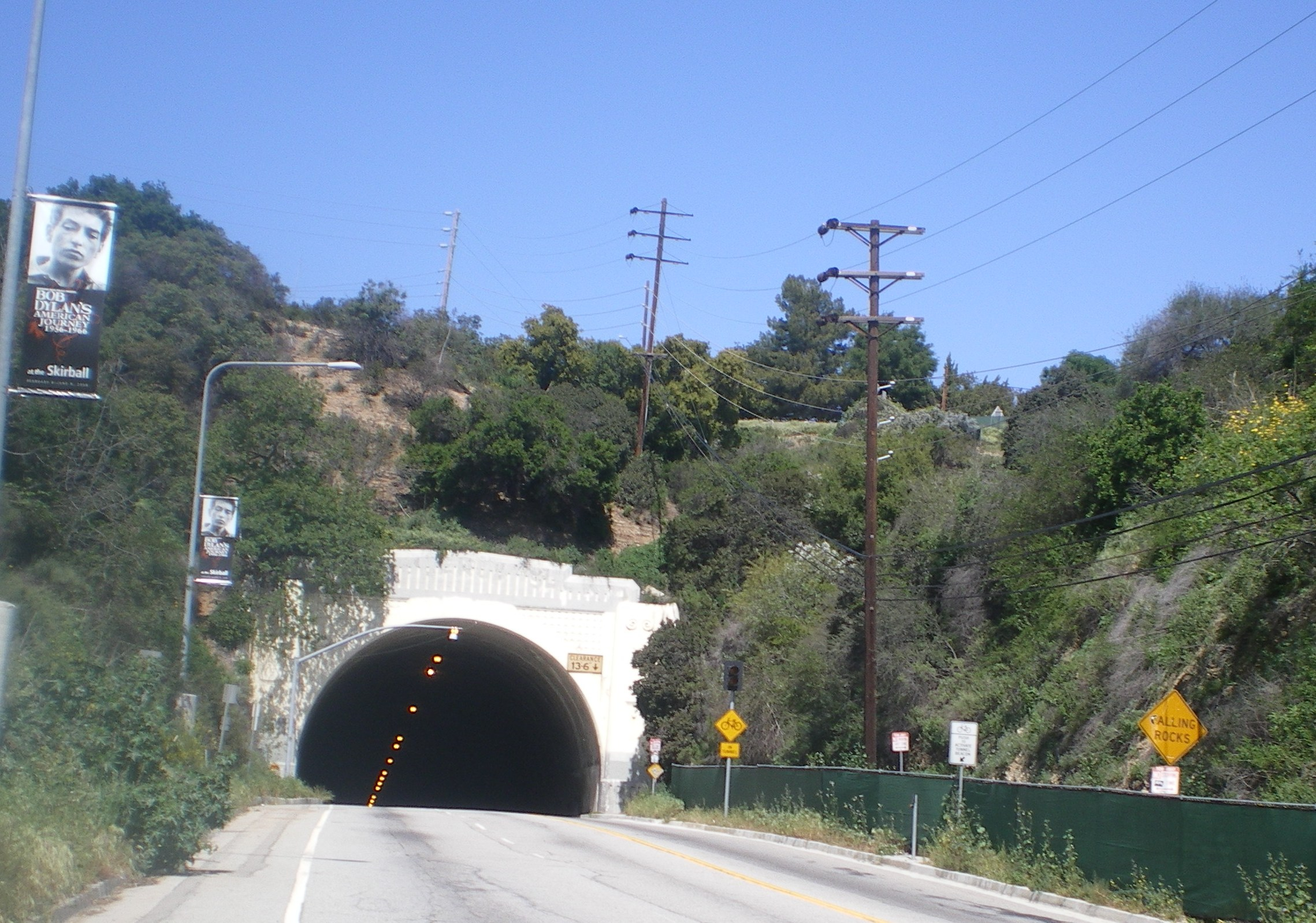
Sepulveda Boulevard Tunnel

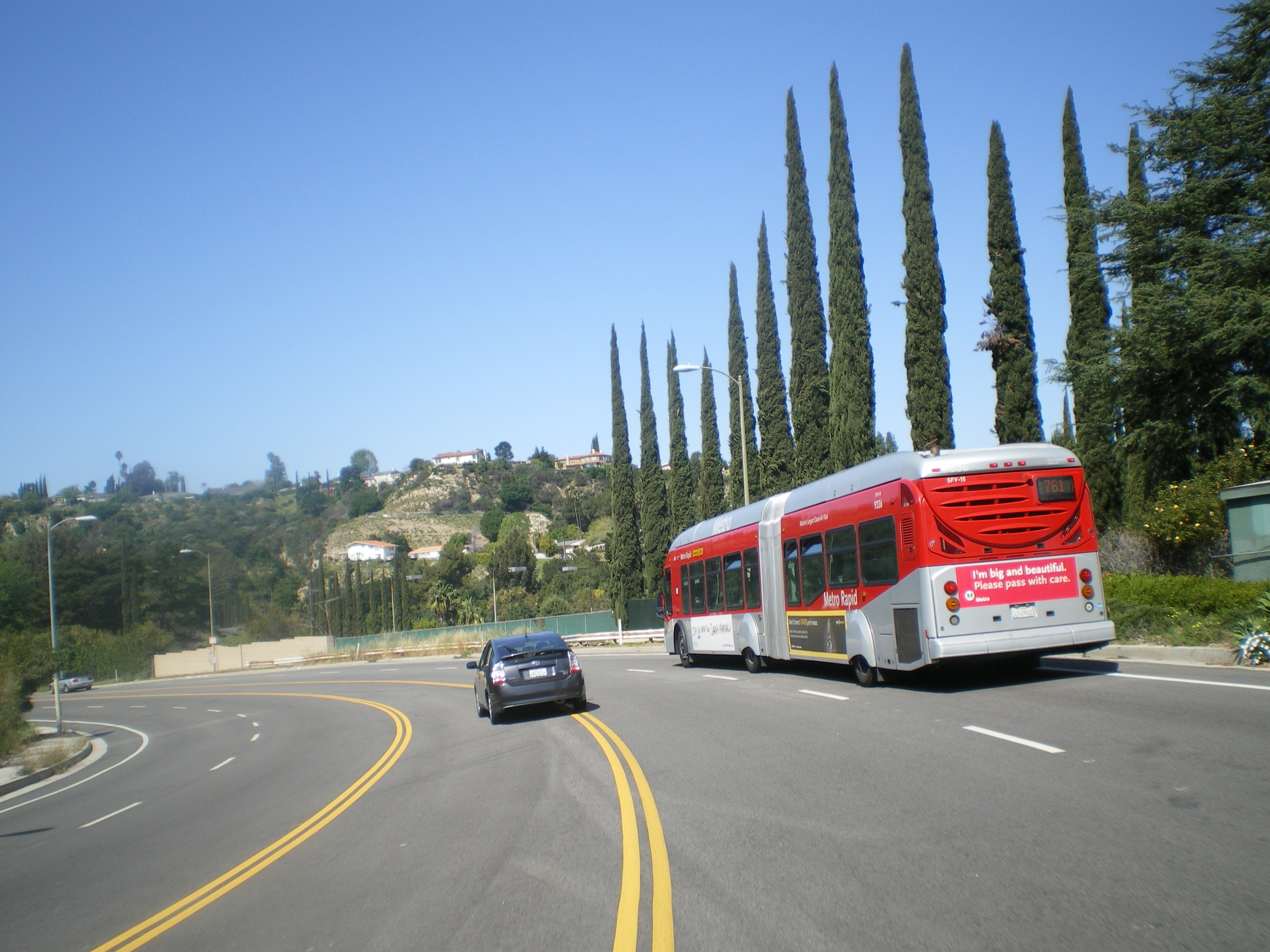
Sepulveda Blvd., Sepulveda Pass

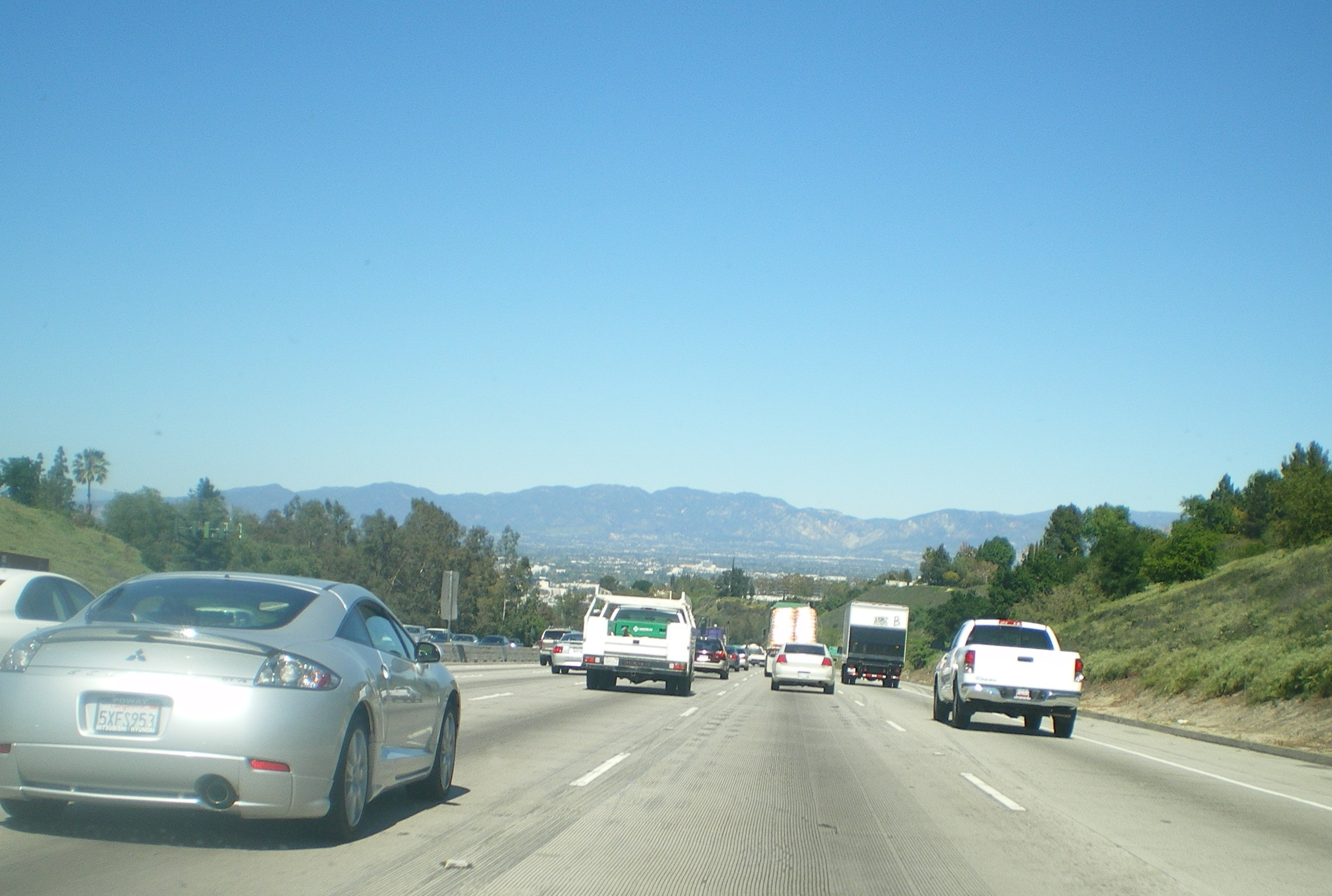
View of the Valley from The 405

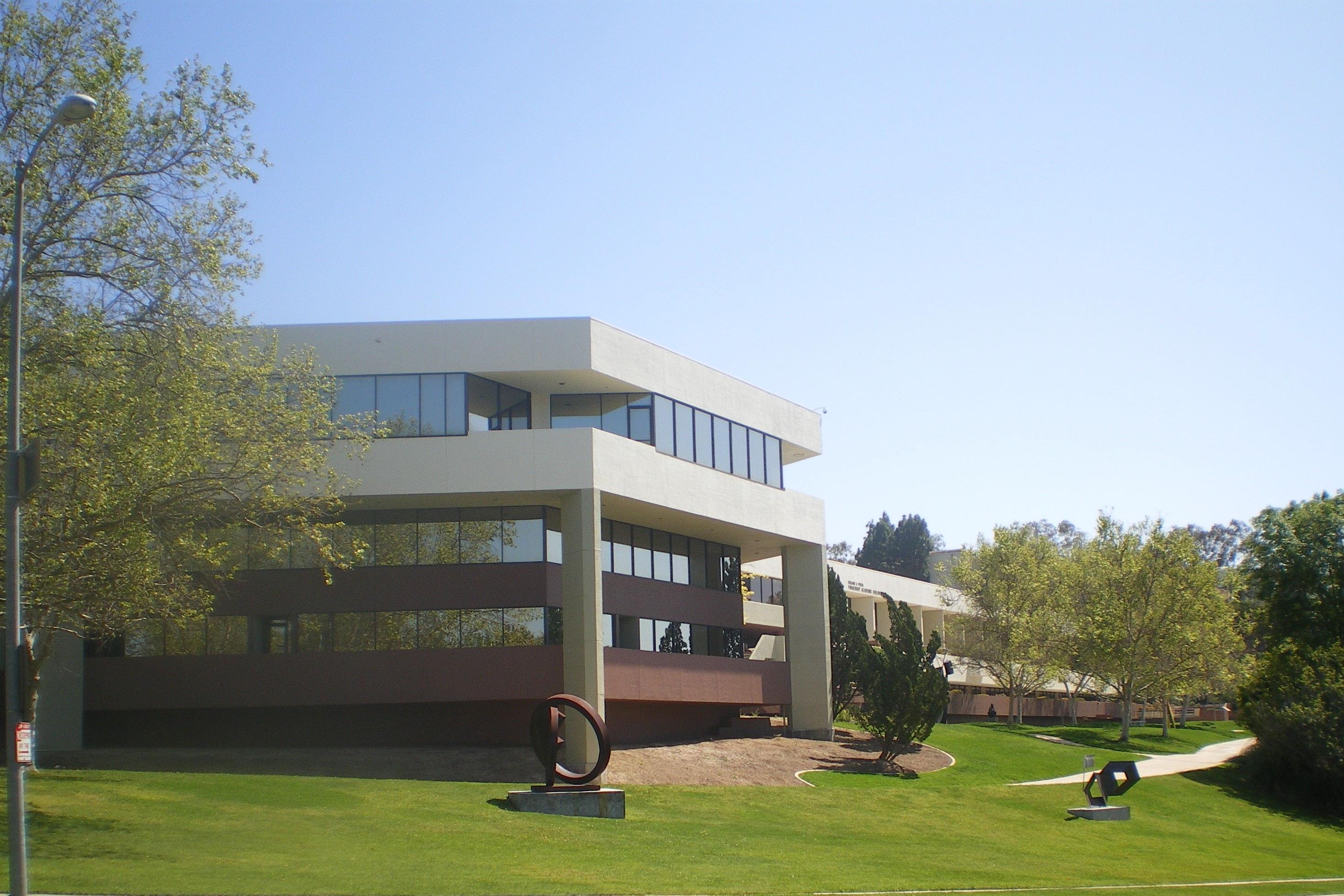
American Jewish University, Bel Air

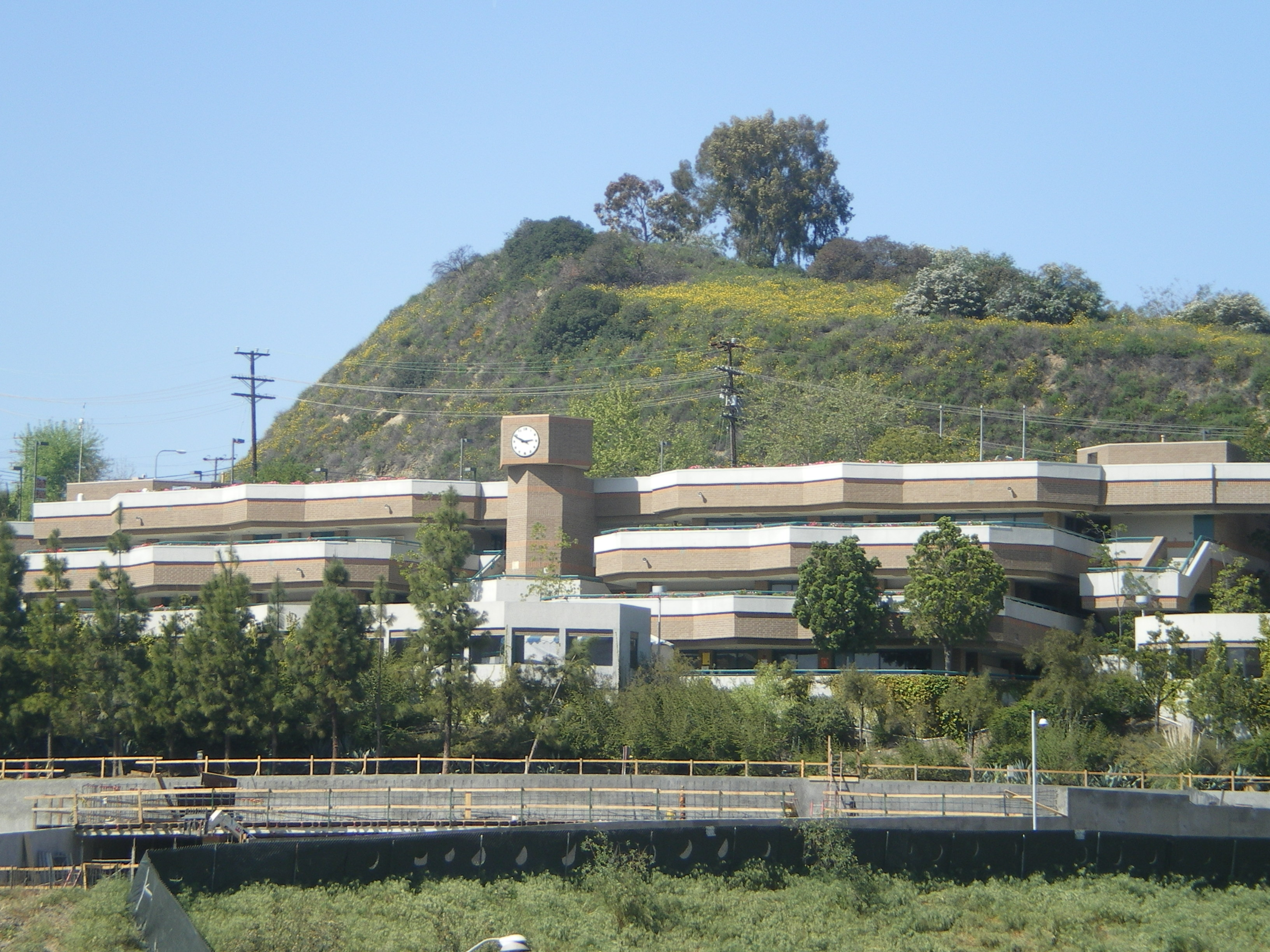
Milken Community High School

Eastern hillside of the Sepulveda Pass, east Skirball Center Drive overpass

== See also ==
- Getty View Park
- Sepulveda Transit Corridor
