= Wallach Hall =

Coordinates: 40°48′21.87″N 73°57′43.02″W

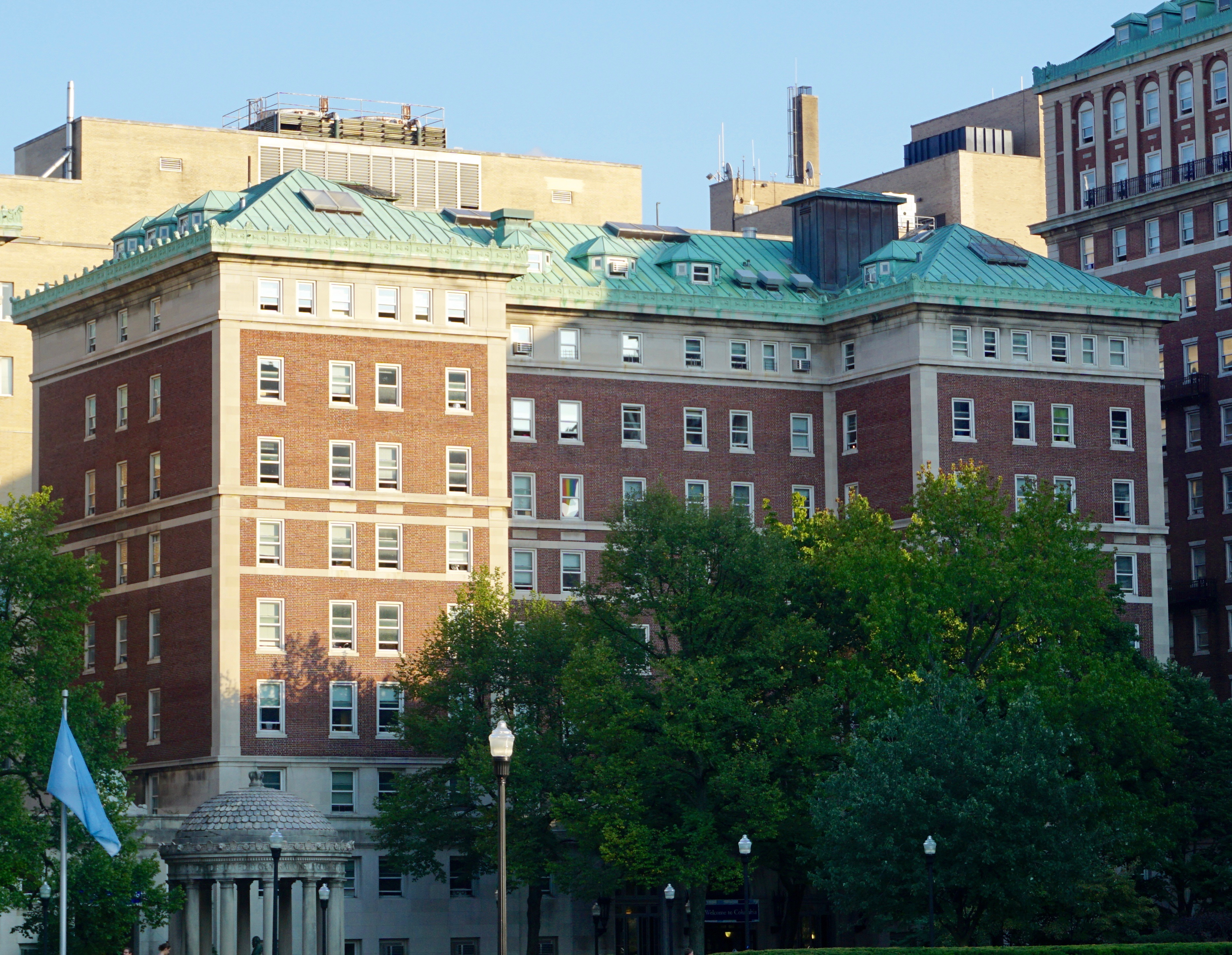
- Wallach Hall in 2016, with John Jay Hall to the right.
- Former names: Livingston Hall

General information
- Address: 1116 Amsterdam Avenue, New York City, New York
- Named for: Ira Wallach
- Opened: 1905
- Owner: Columbia University

Technical details
- Floor count: 9

Design and construction
- Architect(s): McKim, Mead & White

Wallach Hall is the second oldest residence hall (or dormitory) on the campus of Columbia University, and currently houses undergraduate students from Columbia College as well as the Fu Foundation School of Engineering and Applied Science.

It opened in 1905 as Livingston Hall after Robert Livingston, a Founding Father of the United States and alumnus of King's College, Columbia's predecessor, but its name was changed in 1979 after Ira D. Wallach donated approximately $2 million towards its renovation. This gave rise to the joke, "Livingston signed the Declaration of Independence, Wallach signed a check." Although a member of the committee of the Continental Congress that drafted the Declaration, Livingston did not actually sign the historic document.

Wallach Hall was home to Beat Generation author Jack Kerouac. In his autobiography Vanity of Duluoz he expressed his satisfaction with the move from neighboring Hartley Hall:

One great move I made was to switch my dormitory room from Hartley Hall to Livingston Hall where there were no cockroaches and where b'God I had a room all to myself, on the second floor, overlooking the beautiful trees and walkways of the campus and overlooking, to my greatest delight, besides the Van Am Quadrangle, the library itself, the new one, with its stone frieze running around entire with the names engraved in stone forever: "Goethe ... Voltaire ... Shakespeare ... Molière ... Dante." That was more like it. Lighting my fragrant pipe at 8 P.M., I'd open the pages of my homework, turn on station WQXR for the continual classical music, and sit there, in the golden glow of my lamp, in a sweater, sight and say, "Well, now I'm a real collegian at last."

Overhauled during the early 1980s, Wallach is currently, with Hartley, part of the Living and Learning Center (LLC), home to suite-style housing that intermingles all class levels and features interactive events designed to draw them together. An application process is required to obtain housing in either of the LLC dormitories.

== Notable residents ==
- Robert Mountsier, author, journalist and literary agent
- Jacques Barzun, professor, recipient of the Presidential Medal of Freedom
- Isadora Cerullo, Olympic rugby sevens player
- Andrew Sarris, film critic
- Jack Kerouac, Beat Generation author
- Joel Klein, former New York City Schools Chancellor
- Eric Foner, Pulitzer Prize-winning professor of history
- Janice Min, head of Us Weekly, The Hollywood Reporter and Billboard
- Melvin I. Urofsky, American historian
- Nico Muhly, American music composer
- Allen Young, American writer, journalist
- Robert A. M. Stern, American architect, former dean of the Yale School of Architecture
- Jason Epstein, publisher, co-founder of The New York Review of Books
- Hal Chase, archeologist, member of the Beat Generation
- John Giorno, poet, ex-lover of Andy Warhol
- Bhimrao Ramji Ambedkar, Indian jurist, economist and social reformer
