= Community Magnet Charter School =

Magnet school in Los Angeles, California, United States

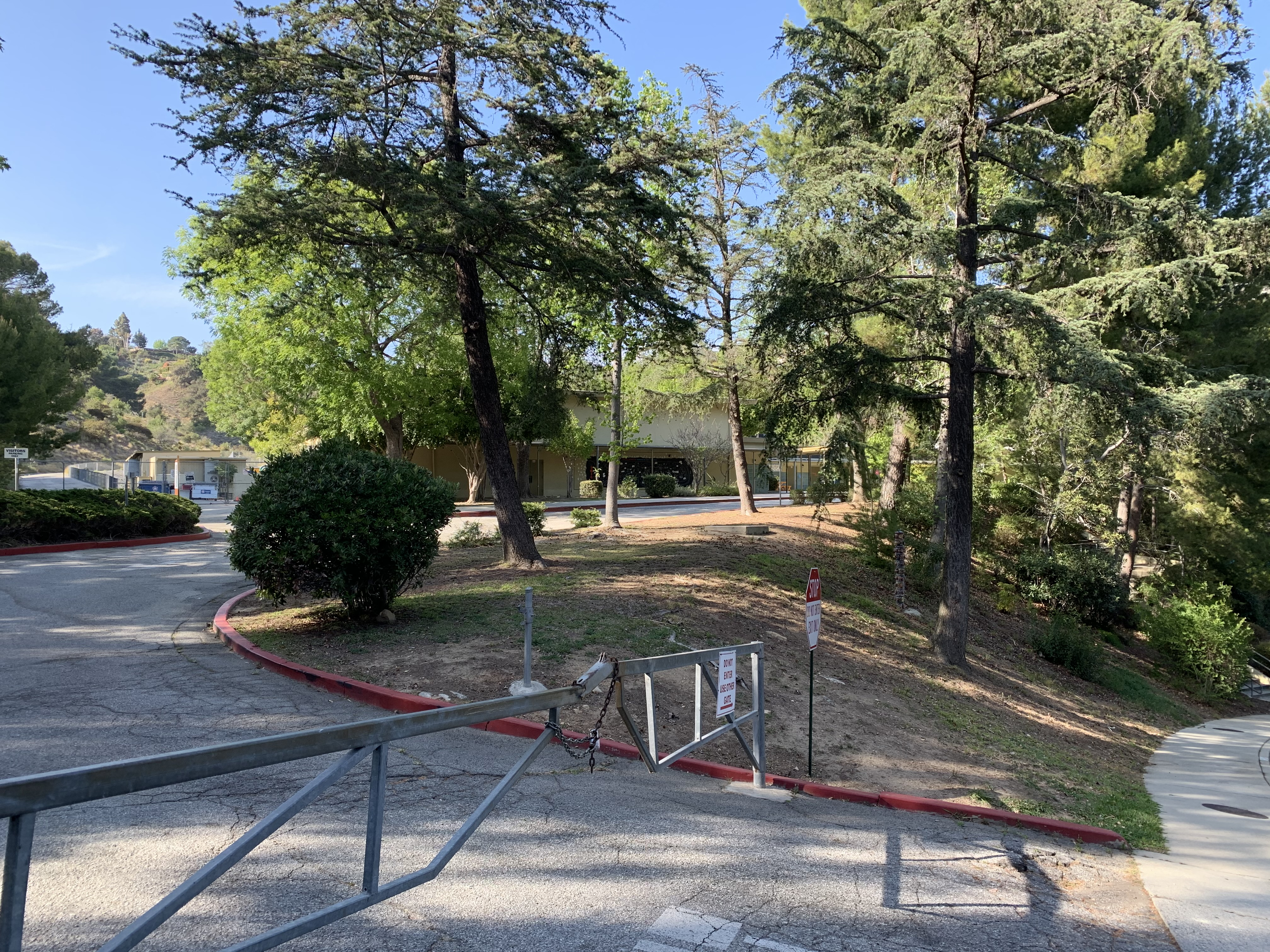
- Campus photo

Location
- 11301 Bellagio Road, Los Angeles, California 90049; United States; 34.082269°N 118.462593°W

Information
- Other name: CMCS
- Type: Public
- School district: Los Angeles Unified School District
- Principal: Toni Klugh
- Grades: K-5
- Enrollment: ~470
- Campus size: 20 acres
- Yearbook: Community Magnet Charter School (year1-year2)
- Website: www.communitymagnet.org

Community Magnet Charter School (CMCS) is a magnet primary school of the Los Angeles Unified School District, located in Bel-Air, Los Angeles, California. Up until 2002, It was located on the property of the Los Angeles Center for Enriched Studies in Mid-City. Community is among the oldest magnet schools in LAUSD. It is racially and ethnically diverse, and its students consistently receive among the highest scores in standardized testing within LAUSD. In 1999 Martha Groves of the Los Angeles Times said that Community was a "high-achieving, innovative elementary school." In 2002 Carol Lynn Mithers, a writer and a parent of a Community magnet student, said in a Los Angeles Times opinion column that the school "is one of the district's jewels." The school also serves as one of two meeting places for the Bel Air Beverly Crest Neighborhood Council.

== History ==
Community Magnet School was established in 1977. At the time of its founding, it was located on the property of the campus of the Los Angeles Center for Enriched Studies (LACES) in Mid-City, and it remained there for a period of around 25 years. Before its founding, Mid-City schools had been racially segregated. Several black and Jewish parents decided to establish an alternative school so that the various ethnic groups could more easily interact with one another. After its founding, according to Martha Groves of the Los Angeles Times, "the school has gained a reputation for parent involvement and student achievement."

For several years, due to the conditions in the existing building, Pamela Marton, the school's principal until the 2010–2011 school year, asked LAUSD to upgrade Community Magnet School's campus. In April of that year, a representative of the United States Department of Education National Blue Ribbon Award committee engaged in a tour of the school, in order to assess whether it is worthy of receiving the National Blue Ribbon award. Groves said that the official "was flabbergasted at what Community has accomplished in spite of its inadequate facilities" and that in his meetings with LAUSD officials he "asked why nothing had been done to improve the situation." In 1999 the school was awarded the Blue Ribbon. It was one of two elementary schools in Los Angeles to receive the award, and it was the only Los Angeles Unified School District (LAUSD) school to do so during that year.

Carol Lynn Mithers, a writer and a parent of a Community magnet student, said in a Los Angeles Times opinion column that, within a month of the exchange with the Department of Education official, "word came down" that the school would be relocated to a new campus built within a then-unused area within the 9.8 acres (4.0 ha) Walgrove Elementary School campus property in Venice, blocks away from Venice High School. In May the school district officially notified the principal that the move had been proposed. The school community had two weeks to decide whether or not to accept the offer. LAUSD had not notified Walgrove in a timely manner that the district had been considering moving the Community Magnet School there.

The Community school parents were opposed to the move. They argued that it would make serving its students more difficult, since many of the students lived east of the Mid-City location, and the proposed location would be 6 miles (9.7 km) to almost 7 miles (11 km) west from its former location. The parents argued that many students would have to spend one hour or more riding on school buses. LACES had a positive reaction to the proposed move, since it could expand and add athletic facilities. Parents at Walgrove had a negative reception to the proposal. Walgrove had been in negotiations with Paul Cummins, the founder of the Crossroads School in Santa Monica, and then the founder of a new private school called New Roads High School, also in Santa Monica. Cummins wanted to develop the New Roads school's new campus on the Walgrove site. He had asked the LAUSD board for months to consider taking a vote on the plan, with no results. Cummins offered to add amenities and cooperative programs in exchange for a short-term lease at the Walgrove site for New Roads. The existence of the Community proposal prevented the New Roads proposal from being realized. Residents of the Mid-City were opposed, since the plan would remove the final remaining elementary magnet school. On an earlier occasion, another alternative elementary school, Open Magnet Charter School, had moved from Mid-City to Westchester from Mid-City.

In June 1999 the Community school officials met with the LAUSD project manager. The project manager proposed building a new facility would have a $4.2 million budget, so a new campus could be constructed on the site of the Walgrove playground using pre-fabricated modular structures. $1.2 million would originate from Community's pre-existing building repair funds from Proposition BB, a school repair bond passed in 1997. According to the plan, the new campus would have an administration building, a lunch shelter, a multipurpose building, and other features. If Community decided not to go forward with the plan, and LACES commenced building a new academic facility, Community would be ejected from the LACES campus and it would have had to find a new location; the possibility that the new location would be very far away from Mid-City existed. Mithers said that after the proposal was presented, the parent body voted to endorse the plans, "[a]mid much grumbling". LAUSD proposed that the new campus would open in the northern hemisphere fall of 2000. On Tuesday June 8, 1999, the LAUSD school board approved the plan to relocate the school to Venice. The vote occurred on the day of LAUSD board elections. On that day, Barbara Boudreaux, a board member who advocated for the move of Community to Walgrove, was replaced by a new board member who opposed of the move.

As the plans commenced, parent groups at Community and Walgrove made contact, and the district hired Martinez Amador Architects Inc. as the architect. Martinez Amador began designing the campus. In December 1999, Community Magnet was scheduled to open in its new location in the northern hemisphere fall of 2001. As time passed, several high-up LAUSD officials related to the proposed move were replaced, and the school district's facilities division, which manages construction of LAUSD schools, had been reorganized. Ruben Zacarias, who served as the LAUSD superintendent, was replaced by Ramon C. Cortines, who was in turn replaced by Roy Romer. By January 2000, the district had not officially given Martinez Amador a contract to build the new facility. Mithers said that by March 2000, "it was growing clear that $4.6 million for the new school wasn't enough." In May of that year, Kathi Littman, the new facilities director, stated that the school should have "stick built," or buildings constructed on site, instead of pre-fabricated buildings, raising the budget to $6 million.

In July 2001, LAUSD informed the Community School that it would not move to the Walgrove site. Around July 2002 the school was considering moving to the former Bellagio Road School campus. By October 2002 Community Magnet had moved to its new location in Bel-Air.

The school previously had class sizes of 20 students per class. Due to budget cuts, the school's class sizes had increased to 24 students per class.

== Campus ==
The school is located in the Bellagio Campus, the former Bellagio Road School in the Bel-Air community, in the canyons above Westwood. The campus has several murals, and colors include pinks and teals. Cara Mia Dimassa of the Los Angeles Times said that the campus was "brightly colored." The school features a 4-acre (1.6 ha) playground, gardens, and a library that includes a small amphitheater and private reading rooms. Stephanie Guzman of the Annenberg School for Communication and Journalism of the University of Southern California said that Community, "[s]urrounded by million dollar homes and views," "is what you’d expect for Bel Air."

The school was previously in the Airdrome Campus, located on the property of the Los Angeles Center for Enriched Studies campus in Mid-City. While there, the school was in a 2.5-acre (1.0 ha) property with "temporary" classroom buildings. While at its Mid-City location, the school did not have covered halls, its own art room, auditorium, food preparation area, or cafeteria/lunchroom. Therefore, when the weather was rainy, students ate lunch within their classrooms, and they traveled through the rain to reach the restrooms. After mandatory class-size reductions occurred, more classes needed to be made, so the school converted two bathrooms and the library into classrooms. In 2002, eight toilets was present for the school's about 300 students. One faculty restroom was present for 36 teachers, office employees, and teacher aides. The classrooms had no air conditioning and no internet access. In 2002 the paint within the classroom building was peeling off. Because of the conditions, Pamela Marton, the school's principal, had asked LAUSD to upgrade Community Magnet School's campus for several years. In 1999 Marton said that "[o]ur school is old and dilapidated. The future looked very bleak here." During that year, Martha Groves of the Los Angeles Times said "Against the odds, teachers and the school's devoted parents have made the place a nurturing home, painting colorful murals and creating a palpable sense of, well, community."

== Admissions ==
The school uses a point system and a lottery to determine which students to admit. The school routinely receives large numbers of applications. The first step is assigning prospective students points based on criteria. For instance, if a student attends a school consisting of racial and ethnic minorities, the student gets four points. If a student has a neighborhood school which has more students than the designed capacity, the student receives four points. For each occasion that the same student applies to Community Magnet, the student gets four points. The applications of the students who have the highest numbers of points are then placed in a lottery. The winners of that lottery are permitted to attend Community Magnet.

The school has racial quotas, so that 40% of the students are non-Hispanic White and 60% are of racial and ethnic minorities. On Tuesday December 11, 2007 California Superior Court Judge Judge Paul Gutman ruled that under California law, LAUSD's racial quota system, which it had been ordered to use by the court system in 1981, would remain in effect. The case was not affected by the July 2007 U.S. Supreme Court Meredith v. Jefferson County Board of Education/Parents Involved in Community Schools v. Seattle School District No. 1 rulings.

In 2004, for every one of the school's 40 Kindergarten slots, it had received 31 applications. In 2010 the school received 2,400 applications for all of its open slots, including 72 Kindergarten slots and a few slots for other grades. Despite being located in Bel-Air, the school does not give admission priority for area students. The school's magnet coordinator says that "If you live in Bel Air and come from a wealthy community, you don’t get any points." As of 2005, to raise awareness about the school to prospective parents, the school sends fliers in English and Spanish to at least 100 preschools within Los Angeles. The school also holds orientation days and field calls in the school auditorium, using the languages of English, Spanish, and Korean.

== Student body ==
As of 2010, 470 students from various communities within LAUSD attend the school. Because of the racial quotas, 40% of the students are White and 60% are racial and ethnic minorities. Because of the ways the application process gives favor to residents of other communities, children from Bel-Air generally do not attend the school.

As of December 1999, the school's 368 students lived across LAUSD. 70% of the school's students lived east of the school's location, then in Mid-City. Many of the students lived in Koreatown. Of the racial groups, over 50% of the students were of black and Asian descent. In 2002 the school had around 300 students.

== Curriculum ==
The school's academic program focuses on the humanities, and the curriculum focuses heavily on visual arts. Carla Cretaro, the magnet coordinator, said in 2010 that "We don’t teach to the test. Our philosophy is, if we teach our best all the time and give them the activities and information they need, they’ll be fine on the exam." As of 2003 and 2004 Community's kindergarten program is all day.

== Student performance ==
Community Charter School students receive among the highest standardized testing scores within LAUSD. As of 2002, students get high scores in the Stanford 9 tests.

== Extra curricular activities ==
The school created a Saturday "reading club" for black students. The parents buy books and lead discussions, while parents and teachers discuss books with students to discuss the books that the students are interested in.

The school also hosts Caring Adults Teaching Children How (CATCH), a volunteer program where a mentor works with a child for one hour per week on reading skills. The Governor of California Office on Child Development and Education awarded Community Magnet the CATCH program as a grant in 1995.

== Notable alumni ==
- Earl Sweatshirt, rapper, member of Odd Future
