= Walter Wang =

Taiwanese-American businessman and philanthropist

- Born: March 25, 1965 (age 61); Xindian District, Taiwan
- Education: University of California, Berkeley (BA)
- Occupations: Businessman, investor, philanthropist
- Known for: The Walter and Shirley Wang Foundation, JM Eagle
- Spouse: Shirley Wang
- Children: 3
- Father: Wang Yung-ching

Walter Wang (born March 25, 1965) is a Taiwanese businessman, investor, and philanthropist. He is the co-founder of The Walter and Shirley Wang Foundation, and JMM Foundation, a philanthropic organization. He is also the CEO of JM Eagle, a global manufacturer of plastic pipe. Wang's father was Wang Yung-ching, founder of the plastics and petrochemicals conglomerate Formosa Plastics Group and was one of the wealthiest individuals in Taiwan before his death in 2008. His sister is Cher Wang, co-founder and chairperson (since 2007) of HTC Corporation and integrated chipset maker VIA Technologies.

== Early life and education ==
Wang's father was Taiwanese billionaire Wang Yung-ching, who is known informally as Y.C. Wang. Wang is the youngest of Y.C. Wang's five children by Wang Yang Chiao. When Wang was nine years old, Wang Yang Chiao left Taiwan against Y.C. Wang's wishes. They moved to Berkeley, California, to be closer to one of Yang Chiao's older children, Cher Wang. Wang attended University of California, Berkeley, where he graduated with a Bachelor of Arts (B.A.) in political science. He then moved back to Taiwan to work for his father's corporation, Formosa Plastics Group, in 1988.

== Career ==
In 2005, Wang purchased JM Manufacturing through syndicated loans from his father. In 2007, Wang bought PW Eagle, another large PVC pipe producer, to form JM Eagle. JM Eagle relocated its headquarters to Los Angeles, California in 2008.

Wang is a board member of the publicly listed Formosa Petrochemical and Formosa Chemical and Fiber Corporations in Taiwan. He is also a member of the Young Presidents Organization Los Angeles and Intercontinental chapters. He belongs to the World Economic Forum and the Committee of 100. Wang sits on the board of directors for the Danny Thompson Memorial Leukemia Foundation, the Los Angeles Police Foundation, the Aaron Diamond AIDS Research Center, the DEA Educational Foundation, the Chinese Overseas Exchange Association (COEA), and the Boao Forum in China. Along with his wife, Wang is a trustee of the U.S. Olympic Committee, and both serve on the board of the Los Angeles Olympic Committee 2028.

Wang is chairman of the New Taipei Kings. In June 2024 Wang announced plans for a new Basketball league across South East Asia, with four of the six teams in Taiwan's P. League+ on board, including the Kings, as well as all five teams in Taiwan's T1 League.

In October 2024, Wang became a member of Forbes 400.

== Philanthropy ==
Wang is co-founder of the Walter and Shirley Wang Foundation and the JMM Foundation, along with his wife.

The Wangs are the most prominent sponsors of the Emmy-nominated PBS documentary Becoming American: The Chinese Experience by [Bill Moyers].

The Walter and Shirley Wang Foundation helped establish the DEA Museum in Los Angeles, California, with the goal of educating the public on illegal drugs and trafficking.

=== Academic contributions ===
In 2017, Walter and Shirley Wang established an endowment at University of California - Los Angeles (UCLA), Shirley Wang's alma mater, to support students from middle-income families and have given scholarships in chemistry and biochemistry to students, graduate students, middle-income students, fellowships, and study abroad programs. The Wangs have also endowed a chair for Asian American Studies and a chair for Medicinal Discovery at UCLA.

At UCLA, they endowed the first academic chair on U.S.-China relations and Chinese American studies in the United States.

The couple also funded Wang Hall at Harvard Westlake School in Los Angeles, California, and provided the lead donation for the renovation of the Harvard-Westlake School Humanities and Art Building.

In 2023, Walter and Shirley Wang donated $2.5 million to help increase support for Columbia University's Yellow Ribbon Program, which now meets 100 percent of student veterans’ tuition and fees. It was described by the university president as “the single most significant gift dedicated to student veterans that this institution has ever received.”

=== Medical contributions ===
Together, the Wangs established an endowed chair at the Cedar Sinai Medical Center for Pediatric Surgery, both to fund novel research in pediatric surgery and to assist underprivileged children in need of surgery.

In the wake of the COVID-19 global pandemic, JM Eagle and Plastpro, Inc. also donated surgical masks to Ohio facilities local to the Plastpro, Inc. factory. The Walter and Shirley Wang donated $1 million to the Mayor's Fund of Los Angeles, in addition to supplies for face shields intended for use at Cedars Sinai Medical Center and the Innovation Lab at UCLA.

They also support Doctors Without Borders.

== Relationship to China ==
In 2013, Wang served as a representative of the China Overseas Exchange Association (COEA) in Beijing, according to the People's Daily. The same year, Wang traveled to Beijing as part of a Committee of 100 delegation to encourage American-Chinese diplomatic relations. In March 2018, Wang attended the first session of the 13th National Committee of the Chinese People's Political Consultative Conference (CPPCC) in Beijing, according to the Overseas Chinese Affairs Office.

== Personal life ==
Ten days after purchasing JM Eagle in 2005, Wang was diagnosed with stage-four nasopharyngeal cancer. He was issued a clean bill of health in mid-2006.
