= Drug Enforcement Administration Museum and Visitors Center =

Museum in the United States

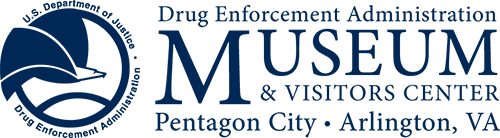

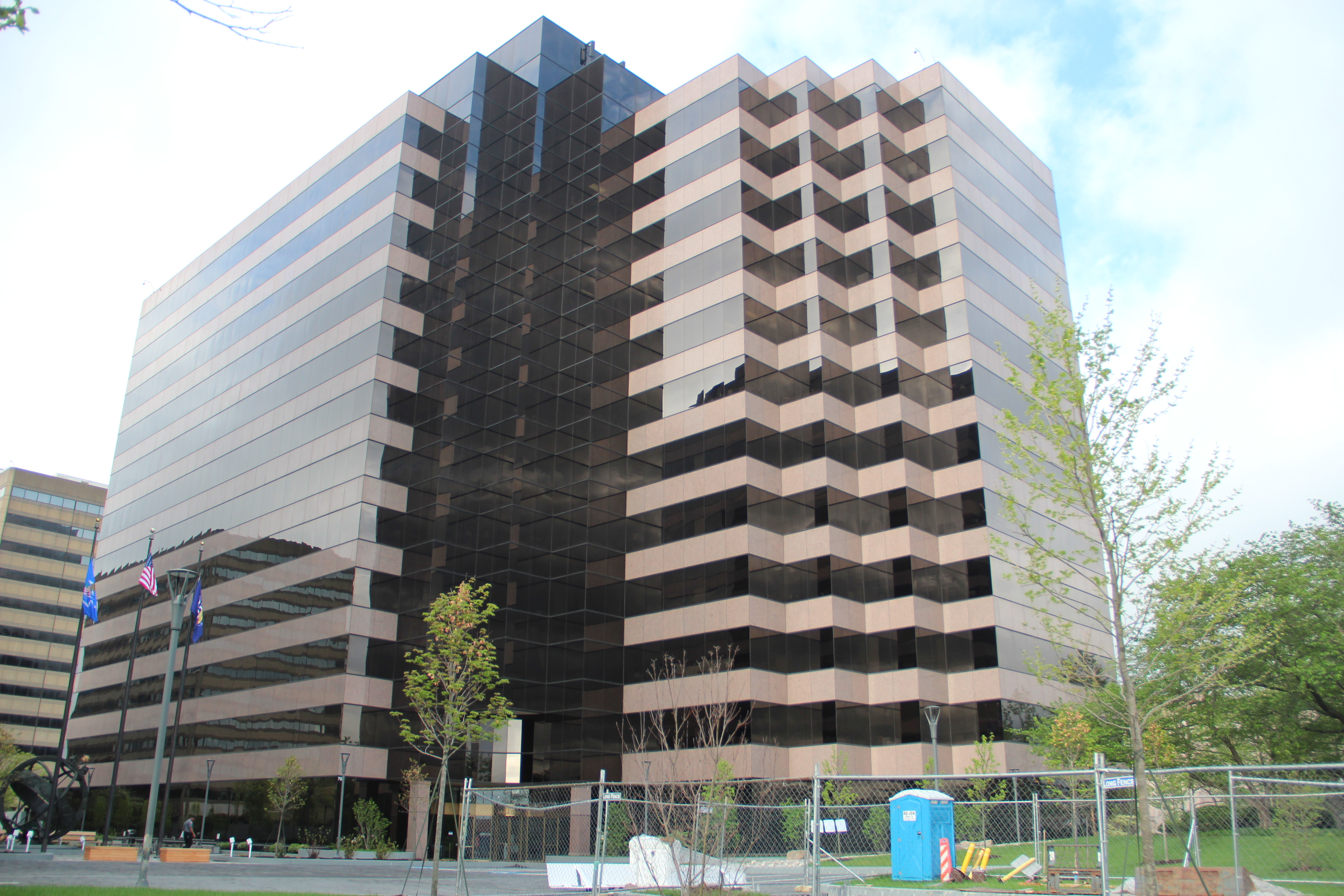
- The museum is located in the DEA agency headquarters
- Established: 1999
- Location: 700 Army Navy Drive; Arlington County, Virginia, U.S.
- Coordinates: 38.8646°N 77.0578°W
- Type: Law enforcement, history of drugs, and drug use
- Owner: Drug Enforcement Administration
- Website: museum.dea.gov

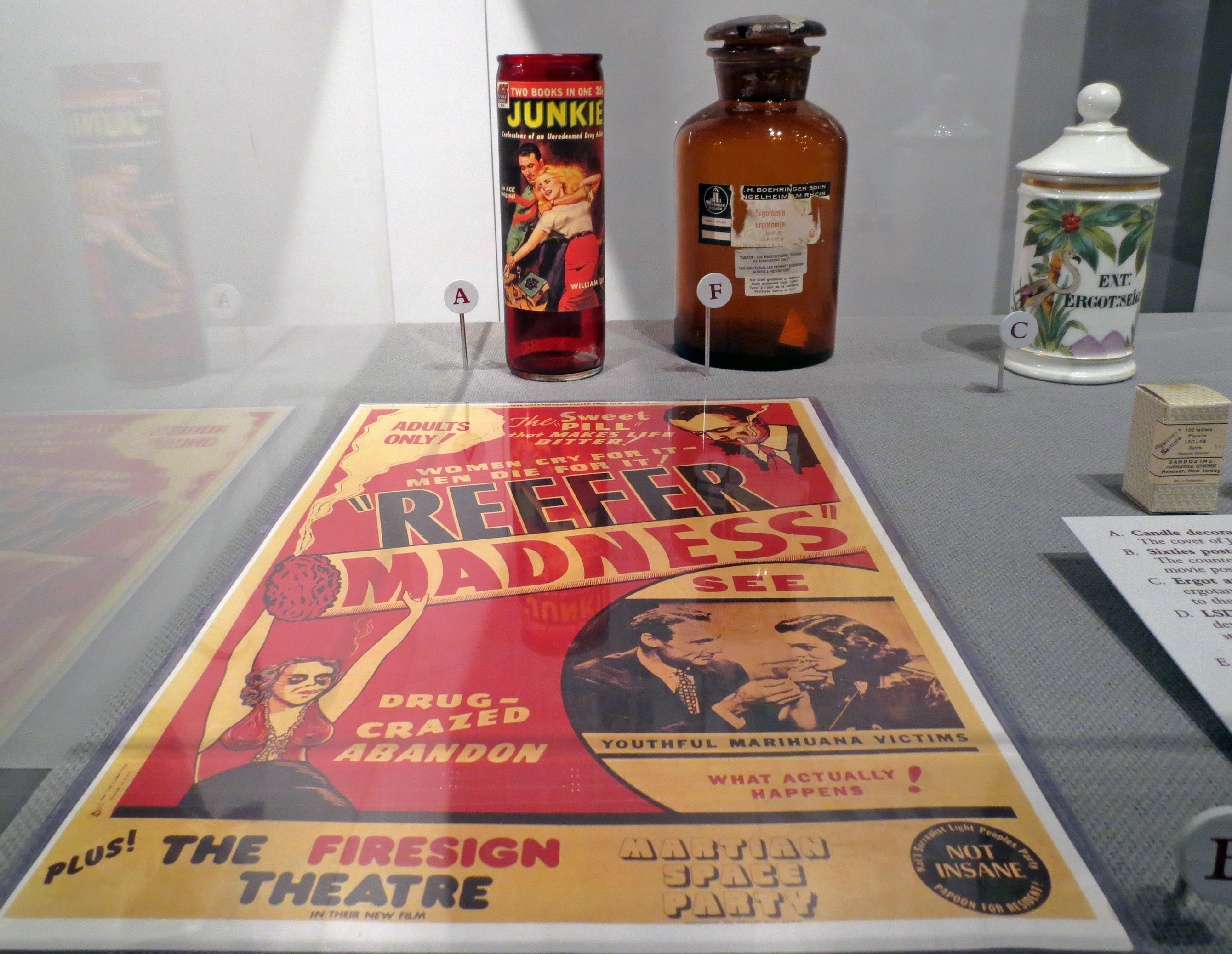
An exhibit at the museum

The Drug Enforcement Administration Museum and Visitors Center is a museum owned by the Drug Enforcement Administration and located at its headquarters in the Pentagon City neighborhood of Arlington County, Virginia. Its first exhibit, featuring exhibits of cannabis, coca, and poppy, opened in 1999.

The museum has appeared on a list of ten best sites published in USA Today. Fodor's calls its exhibits "hard hitting"; Lonely Planet's guide to Washington D.C. sarcastically recommended the museum, "If...you think all drug users and pushers should go to jail for a very long time and drugs and terrorism go hand in hand--or if you just have a thing for heavy-handed propaganda".
