= Chen Chao-long =

Taiwanese transplant surgeon

- 陳肇隆
- Born: 29 September 1950 (age 75); Kaohsiung, Taiwan
- Education: Kaohsiung Medical University (MD)
- Known for: Performed the first human liver transplant in Asia (1984); Performed the first living donor liver transplantation in Taiwan (1994); Performed the first split-liver transplant in Asia (1997); Performed the first dual-graft living donor liver transplantation in Taiwan (2002)
- Scientific career
- Fields: Transplantation surgery
- Workplaces: Chang Gung Memorial Hospital

Chen Chao-long (Chinese: 陳肇隆; pinyin: Chén Zhàolóng; Pe̍h-ōe-jī: Tân Tiǎu-liông; born 29 September 1950) is a Taiwanese transplant surgeon.

== Early life and education ==
Chen was born in Kaohsiung on 29 September 1950. He earned his medical degree at Kaohsiung Medical University and trained in surgery at Chang Gung Memorial Hospital and The Hospital for Sick Children, followed by a fellowship at the University of Pittsburgh, where he worked with Thomas Starzl. He has taught at China Medical University and Chang Gung University.

== Career ==
Chen has performed several groundbreaking surgeries. ResearchGate has compiled over 300 of Chen's publications. According to Google Scholar, his works have been cited 16,000 times. Semantic Scholar considers 188 of his works to be highly influential.

=== 1980s–2000s ===
He led the first successful liver transplant in Asia in March 1984 at Chang Gung Memorial Hospital's Linkuo branch. By February 1991, six liver transplants had been performed at Chang Gung, and Chen presented findings on the surgery in Asia at that year's International Symposium on Treatment of Liver Cancer.

In 1993, Chen established a liver transplant program at Chang Gung's Kaohsiung branch. The next year, Chen oversaw Taiwan's first living donor liver transplantation. In 1997, Chen performed Asia's first split-liver transplantation. This was followed by Taiwan's first dual-graft living donor liver transplantation in 2002. This body of work led to acknowledgement of Chen as "the father of liver transplants in Asia." In 2003, Chen was appointed superintendent of Chang Gung Memorial Hospital. In this position, Chen led the hospital as it faced the 2003 SARS outbreak. As superintendent, he led several medical teams to Taiwan's diplomatic allies in Latin America to perform surgeries. He was elected an academician of the Chinese Academy of Engineering in 2007.

=== 2010s–present ===
In 2015, Chen Chao-long led Chen Shui-bian's medical team alongside Lai Wen-ter. He remained superintendent of Chang Gung Memorial Hospital through 2015. By 2016, Chen had become honorary superintendent. In June of that year, the Ministry of Health and Welfare recognized Chen in the inaugural conferment of a global health care award. In January 2019, Kaohsiung mayor Han Kuo-yu appointed Chen healthcare ambassador for the city.
