= Formosa Plastics Corp =

Taiwanese plastics company

Formosa Plastics Corporation
- Native name: 台灣塑膠公司
- Romanized name: Táiwān sùjiāo gōngsī
- Company type: Public
- Traded as: TWSE: 1301
- Industry: Chemicals
- Founded: 1954; 72 years ago
- Headquarters: Kaohsiung City, Taiwan
- Key people: Lee Chih-tsuen (李志村) (President)
- Products: PVC (Polyvinyl Chloride) resins, high density polyethylene, tairylan acrylic fiber, acrylic acid and ester, carbon fiber, caustic soda, PVC modifier, calcium carbonate
- Total assets: ▼US$16.3 billion
- Number of employees: 10,000
- Website: www.fpc.com.tw www.fpcusa.com

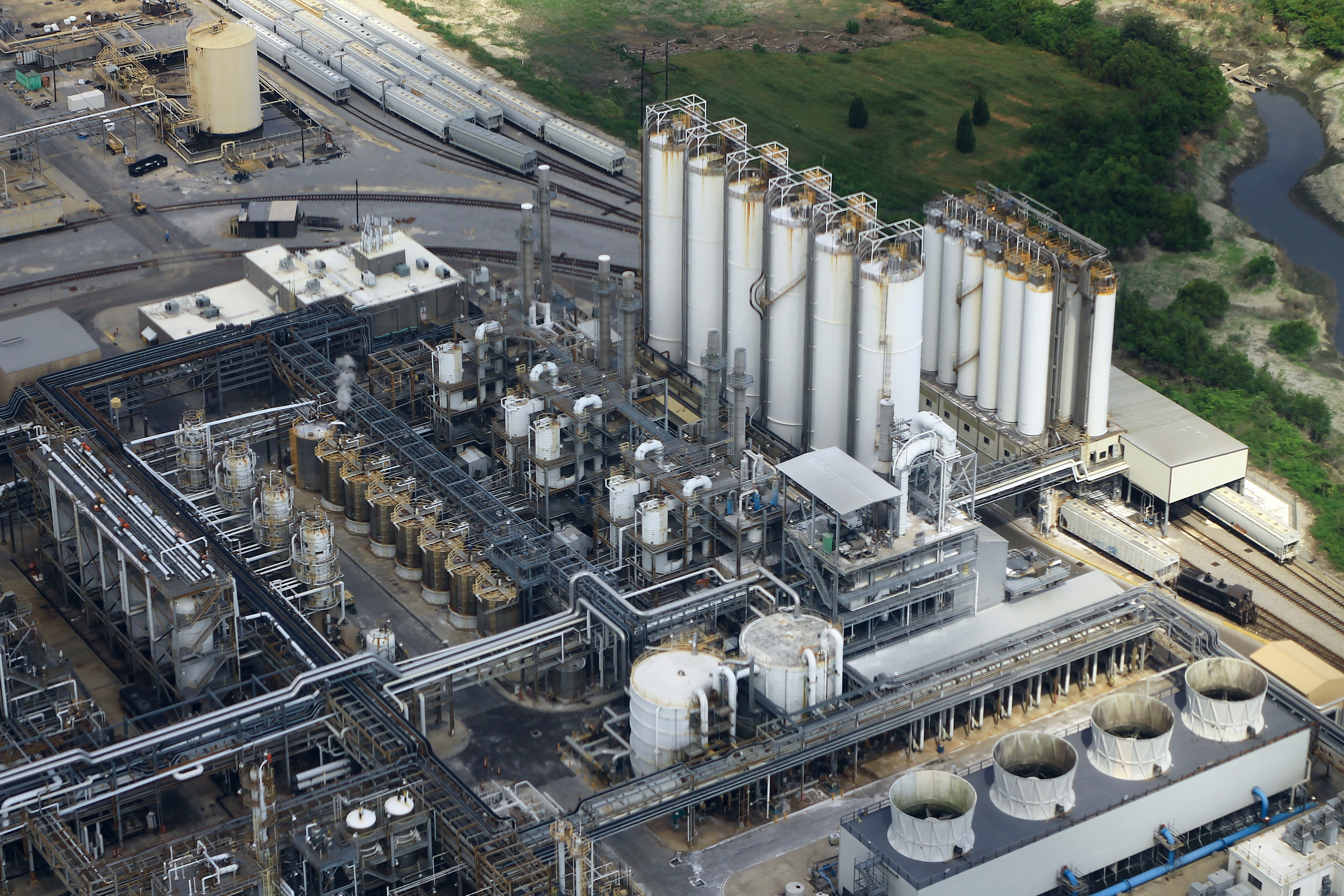
Aerial view of a Formosa Plastics plant in Baton Rouge, Louisiana

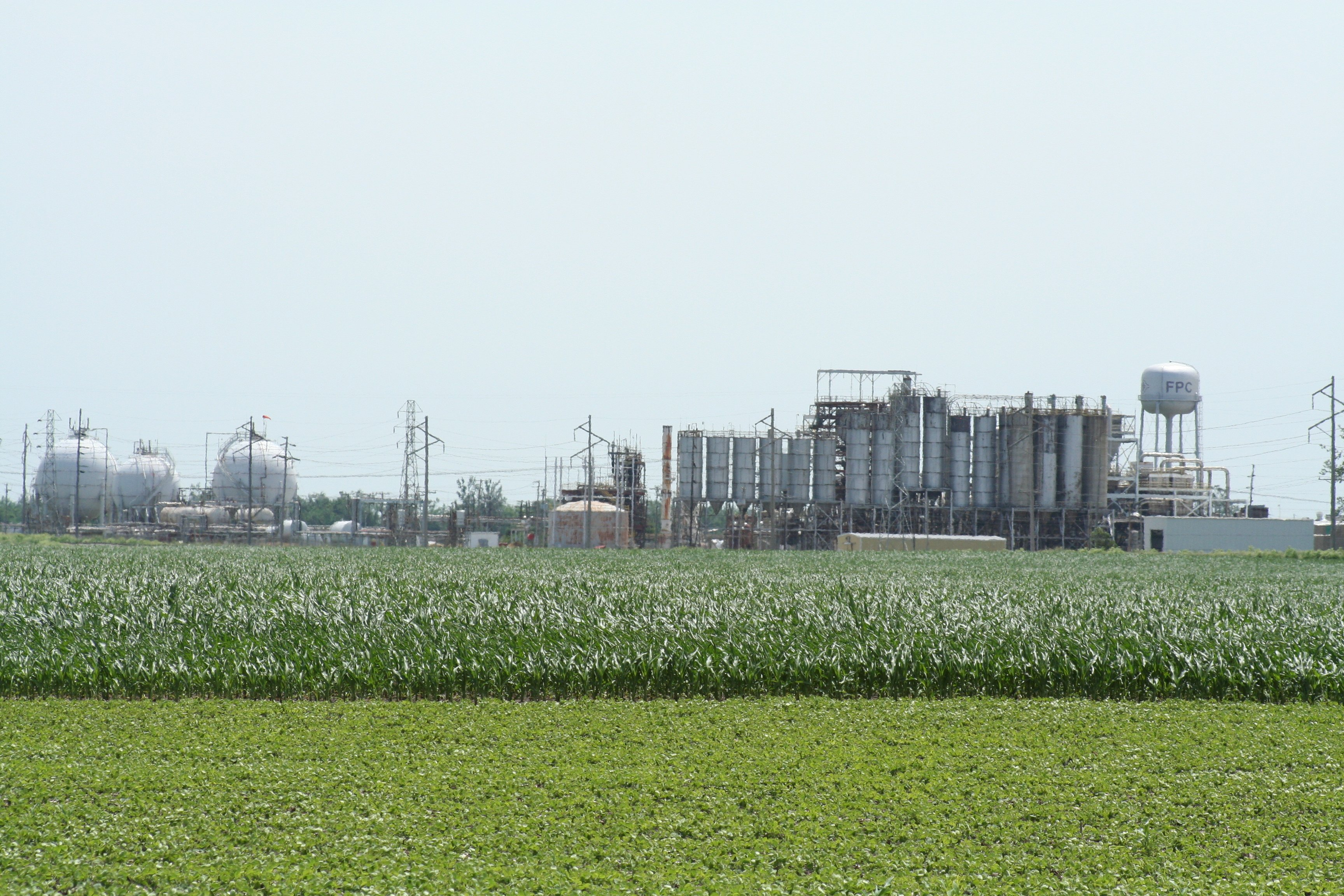
A Formosa Plastics plant near Illiopolis, Illinois. It closed after exploding on 23 April 2004, killing five employees.

Formosa Plastics Corporation (Chinese: 台灣塑膠公司; lit. 'Taiwan Plastics Company') is a Taiwanese plastics company based in Kaohsiung, Taiwan, that primarily produces polyvinyl chloride (PVC) resins and other intermediate plastic products. It is the corporation around which influential businessman Wang Yung-ching formed the Formosa Plastics Group, and it remains central to the Group's petrochemical operations. The president of Formosa Plastics Corp. (FPC) is Jason Lin (林健男).

In 2019, Chemical & Engineering News ranked Formosa Plastics as the world's sixth largest chemical company by sales in 2018, with US$36.9 billion. That same year, Forbes ranked the company as No. 758 on its Global 2000 list of the world's largest public companies. Formosa has received substantial criticism over widespread pollution and reprisal tactics against environmental activists.

== History ==
The company was founded in 1954, by Wang Yung-ching and Wang Yung-tsai with a US$798,000 loan from United States aid agencies. The first PVC plant was constructed in Kaohsiung and production began in 1957. As of 2005, FPC is the largest producer of PVC resins in Taiwan. When FPC's American operations are also considered, the company's total PVC resin capacity is 2.83 million metric tons per year, the second highest in the world after Shin-Etsu Chemical, which has 3.55 million metric tons per year as of May 2010 (expanding to 3.85 million metric tons per year by the end of 2010).

FPC maintains numerous subsidiaries throughout Taiwan, jointly held with other members of the Formosa Plastics Group. In addition, Formosa Plastics Corporation, USA was founded in 1978 as a wholly owned subsidiary of FPC. That subsidiary has, in turn, created four wholly owned chemical manufacturing subsidiaries in Delaware City, Delaware, Illiopolis, Illinois, Baton Rouge, Louisiana, and Point Comfort, Texas.

Formosa Plastics Corporation's operations include chemical and petrochemical manufacturing. In 1994, Formosa formed the Formosa Transrail to operate a rail fleet.

=== Recent updates ===
==== St James Parish, Louisiana ====
In April 2018, Formosa Plastics and sister corporation Formosa Petrochemical Corporation announced a new US$9.4 billion chemical manufacturing complex, set to be located across a 2,400-acre site in St. James Parish, Louisiana. Branded as "The Sunshine Project," the complex, made up of 14 facilities, including 10 plants, would produce ethylene glycol, polyethylene, and polypropylene. Construction was initially set to begin in 2019, with the initial opening date set for 2024 and the final stage of the development being completed by approximately 2029. The Louisiana Department of Environmental Quality (LDEQ) approved the air permits for the project in January 2020.

In February 2020, Earthjustice filed a lawsuit to challenge LDEQ's approval of the air permits. Sharon Lavigne and a number of other community activists also filed suit via their nonprofit, Rise St. James, and helped stall the project as of June 2021. Lavigne won the 2021 Goldman Environmental Prize for her opposition toward Formosa's plans.

On September 14, 2022, District Judge Trudy White cancelled air quality permits for the new facility issued to Formosa by the LDEQ. Formosa appealed the ruling and won in appellate court in 2024.

==== Texas ====
In May 2018, citing stronger demand in the co-polymer market, Formosa Plastics announced new expansions in polyethylene and polypropylene production plant technologies for its facility in Point Comfort, all licensed from ExxonMobil, Univation Technologies, and Japan Polypropylene Corporation. In August 2019, the first of two new polyethylene plants had begun operating. The second plant and cracker were scheduled to fully operate in December 2019, but their opening was delayed until at least April 2020, pending further updates. The new polypropylene plant is scheduled to begin operating in the third quarter of 2021.

==== Baton Rouge ====
In August 2019, Formosa Plastics announced it was planning to invest in a US$332 million expansion at its Baton Rouge facility to expand production of PVC resin. Construction began later in the year and is expected to be completed by the fourth quarter of 2021. The expansion would allow the company to produce an additional 300 million pounds of resin. For the expansion, the company would receive a performance-based grant up to US$500,000 from the state of Louisiana.

== Controversies ==
=== Pollution and waste violations ===
In 1999, Formosa Plastics used bribes to dump 3000 tons of mercury-laden waste in Sihanoukville, Cambodia – three local villagers died shortly afterwards, although a report commissioned by the World Health Organization concluded it was unlikely the deaths were due to mercury poisoning. The company later tried to ship the waste to a hazardous waste site in Nevada.

A 2002 survey undertaken by Scorecard, an environmental watch group, rated Formosa Plastics' facilities in the 90th percentile of the worst environmental polluters.

In 2009, the Taiwanese Environmental Protection Administration (EPA) found that the soil and the groundwater in the area close to Formosa Plastics' Renwu plant had been polluted by benzene, chloroform, dichloromethane, 1,1,2-Trichloroethane, 1,1-dichloroethylene, tetrachloroethylene, trichloroethylene, and vinylchloride. The pollutants were all present at levels over 20 times the government standard; and most frighteningly, the levels of 1,2-dichloroethane were 30,000 times higher than the standard.

In September 2009, the United States Environmental Protection Agency announced that Formosa Plastics would spend more than US$10 million to address air, water, and hazardous waste violations from two of the company's plants in Point Comfort and Baton Rouge, after inspectors found leak detection and repair and waste violations at the facilities. Formosa Plastics also agreed to pay an additional civil penalty of US$2.8 million for numerous federal law violations.

In April 2012, Formosa Plastics filed a US$1.3 million civil suit for a tort claim and a criminal suit for defamation against Tsuang Ben-jei, a scientist who works at National Chung Hsing University in Taichung, for presenting evidence of increased cancer risk in the vicinity of the Formosa Plastic Group hydrocarbon-processing facility in Mailiao at a scientific meeting and in a paper. More than 1,000 academics, including chemistry Nobel laureate Yuan T. Lee, signed a letter of support for Tsuang. In September 2013, judges at Taipei District Court ruled against Formosa Plastics.

In April 2016, Formosa Plastics was blamed by numerous protesters and media outlets for mass fish deaths in four provinces of Vietnam since 6 April. On 30 June 2016, the Vietnamese government officially concluded that the local Formosa Plastics affiliate steel plant was responsible for the marine ecological disaster. Formosa Plastics agreed to pay compensation of US$500 million and publicly apologized for the disaster. Controversy grew over rumors that the apology was issued under coercion from the Vietnamese government.

In July 2017, retired shrimper Diane Wilson sued Formosa Plastics in Federal court for up to US$184 million for damages relating to the company's noncompliance with state and federal environmental permits and laws that require companies to report all waste violations, particularly with the discharge of plastic pellets into Lavaca Bay and other waterways from the company's Point Comfort plant.

In March 2019, the trial began and in June 2019, U.S. District Judge Kenneth M. Hoyt ruled against Formosa Plastics, noting the company's consistent violation of state-issued permits and federal laws. In October 2019, Formosa Plastics agreed to pay US$50 million over five years in a settlement to fund projects reversing water pollution damage in Calhoun County and also comply with "zero discharge" of plastic pollutants in the future, making it the largest settlement of a Clean Water Act suit filed by private individuals. This controversy was portrayed in episode 12 ("Point Comfort") of the Netflix series Dirty Money in 2020.

Plastic pollution continued in Lavaca Bay even after the court settlement.

=== Explosions ===
Formosa Plastics has been involved in a series of deadly explosions at their facilities. After an explosion in a Formosa Plastics polyvinyl chloride manufacturing facility plant in Illiopolis, Illinois, that killed 5 workers and severely injured 3 in April 2004, OSHA fined the company US$300,000 for violations. In 2005, an explosion at the Point Comfort plant hurt 11 workers.

== See also ==
- List of companies of Taiwan
- Formosa Plastics Group Museum
- 2016 Vietnam fish kill
- Formosa Ha Tinh Steel
