= Ming Chi University of Technology =

University in New Taipei, Taiwan

Coordinates: 25.0418°N 121.4203°E

- 明志科技大學
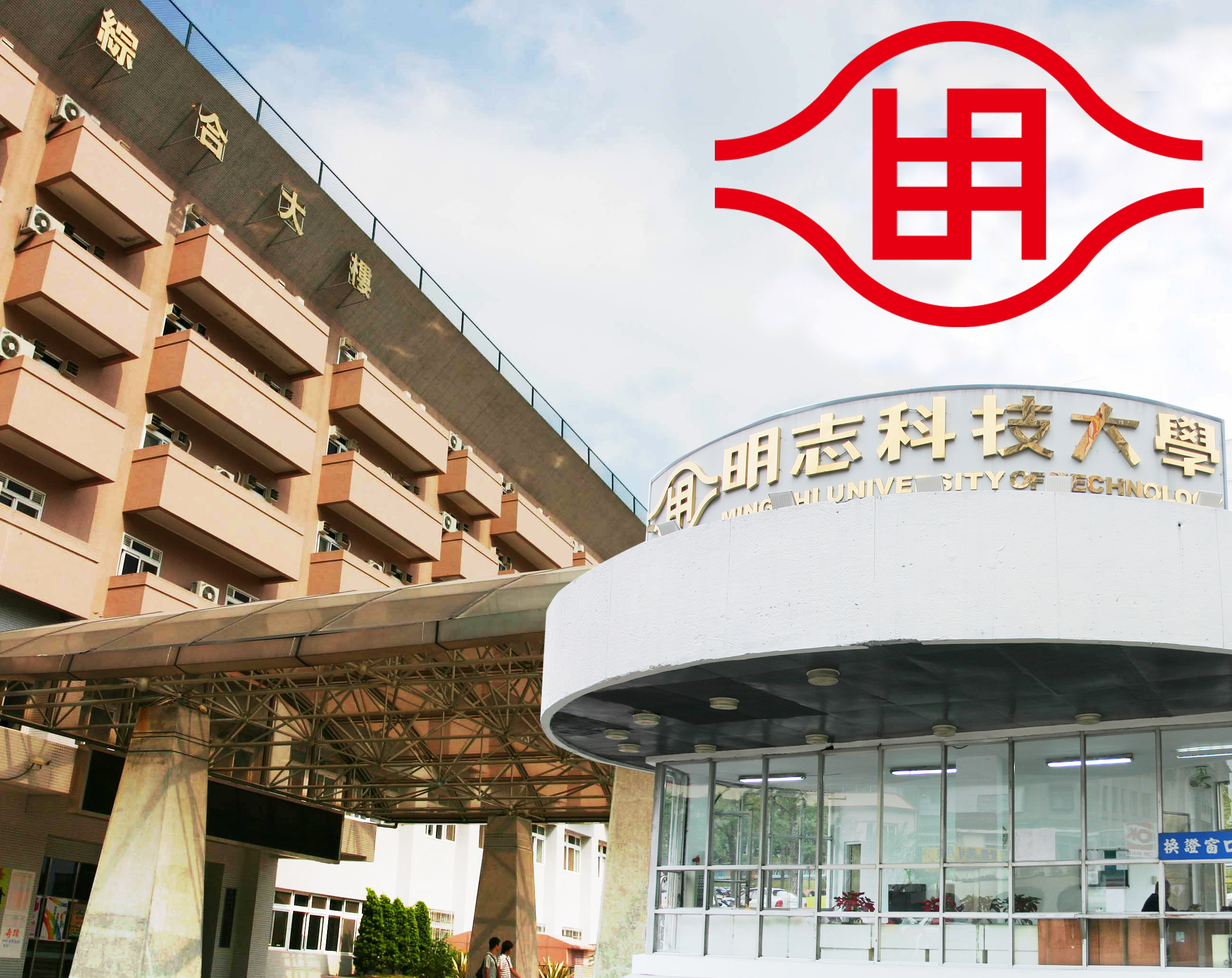
- Motto: 勤勞樸實 (Pe̍h-ōe-jī: Khîn-lô Phok-si̍t)
- Motto in English: Diligence, Perseverance, Frugality and Trustworthiness
- Type: Private
- Established: 1963
- President: Liu, Thu-Hua
- Academic staff: 190
- Undergraduates: 3,692
- Postgraduates: 487
- Location: Taishan, New Taipei, Taiwan
- Campus: Suburban, 61 hectares
- Colors: Red and Gray
- Website: www.mcut.edu.tw
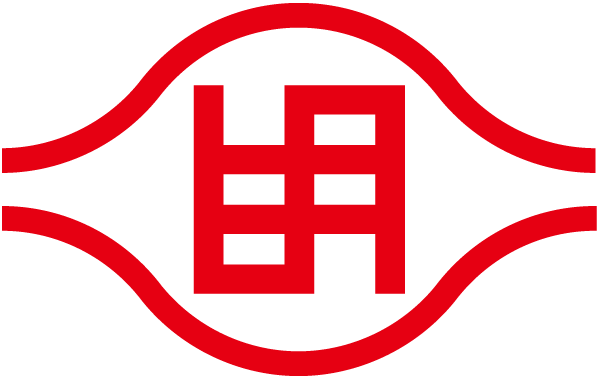

Ming Chi University of Technology
- Traditional Chinese: 明志科技大學
Transcriptions
Standard Mandarin
- Hanyu Pinyin: Míngzhì Kējì Dàxué
Southern Min
- Hokkien POJ: Bêng-chì Kho-ki Tāi-ha̍k

Ming Chi University of Technology (MCUT; Chinese: 明志科技大學; Pe̍h-ōe-jī: Bêng-chì Kho-ki Tāi-ha̍k) is a private university of technology in Taishan District, New Taipei, Taiwan. Established in 1963, it currently consists of three colleges: College of Engineering, College of Environment and Resources, and College of Management and Design.

MCUT has been consistently regarded as one of the top technical and vocational universities in Taiwan and is well known for its co-operative training programs.

== Motto ==
Diligence, Perseverance, Frugality and Trustworthiness.

This motto is the statement of belief by the Formosa Plastics Group, with MCUT being one of its subsidiaries. The first two terms indicate that MCUT expects students to be hard-working and to do right and meaningful things. Frugality and trustworthiness imply that students are taught to appreciate a simple and honest life. That is, students are trained to work hard pursuing their life goals and become useful members of society.

== History ==
The school was established as Ming Chi Institute of Technology in 1963 by Wang Yung-ching, an influential entrepreneur in Taiwan and founder of Formosa Plastics Group. With its impressive performance developing industrial professionals, the school was approved for upgrading to be a four-year technical college in 1999. After introducing more departments and research centers in subsequent years, the school was again approved in 2004 for and renamed Ming Chi University of Technology.

The school's present name was chosen in recognition of a former private academy which was located in the vicinity of MCUT. Founded by Hu Cho-Yu during the Qing dynasty, the 'Ming Chi Academy' was the first private school in northern Taiwan. It is believed that MCUT was named 'Ming Chi' to motivate and encourage its students to learn the teachings from virtuous elders.

== Rankings ==
For the 2010–2011 period, Web of Science placed MCUT faculty's numbers of papers-per-author published in SCI and SSCI journals at 3rd in the world in the 'technological and vocational university/college' category.

In terms of design, MCUT ranked 19th in the German iF Concept Award's 'universities' category in 2012.

According to the 2013 Academic Ranking of Taiwan Universities/Colleges released by Tamkang University, MCUT ranked 30th among 104 graduate-level universities, 7th among technical/vocational universities, and 1st in the category of private colleges/universities of technology.

== Chairpersons of the Board ==
Wang Yung-ching	1963–2006
Young John Ding-E	2006–present

== Presidents ==
Weng, Tong-Ying (翁通楹)	1964–1969
Ding, Rui-Yang (丁瑞鉠)	1969–1970
Chen, Li-An (陳履安)	1970–1972
Zhang, Zhi-Liang (張志良)	1972–1979
Chen, Zhao-Xiong (陳昭雄)	1979–1982
Zhou, Wen-Xian (周文賢)	1982–1994
Xie, Long-Fa (謝龍發)	1994–1995
Cheng, Wan-Xing (程萬行)	1995–1996
Lin, Rong-Tai(林榮泰)	1996–2002
Liu, Thu-Hua (劉祖華)	2002–2003
Lin, Rong-Tai (林榮泰)	2003-2003
Liu, Thu-Hua (劉祖華)	2003–present

== Academic Organization ==
The structure of MCUT's academic organization is as follows:

College of Engineering	College of Environment and Resources	College of Management and Design	Education Centers	Research Centers
Department of Mechanical Engineering	Department of Chemical Engineering & Institute of Biochemical Engineering	Department of Industrial Engineering and Management	General Education Center	Center for Thin Film Technologies and Applications
Department of Electrical Engineering	Department of Safety, Health and Environmental Engineering	Department of Business and Management		Battery Research Center of Green Energy
Department of Electronic Engineering	Department of Materials Engineering & Graduate Institute of Materials Engineering	Department of Industrial Design		Biochemical Technology R&D Center
		Department of Visual Communication Design		

== Research ==
Research at MCUT has been characterized by a particular emphasis on 'industry-oriented' studies. Since the school was approved for its upgrade to a university of technology, it has focused on strengthening cooperation between academia and industry. Furthermore, in recent years, MCUT has worked towards integrating the resources of its three colleges and established four research centers, which are: the Biochemical Technology R&D Center, the Center for Thin Film Technologies and Applications, the Chinese Herbal Medicine Center, and the Battery Research Center of Green Energy. Through the use of these four units' R&D capabilities, MCUT has actively participated in practical research and offered various types of technical services to relevant enterprises.

To encourage close and constant interactions through sharing research with relevant industry enterprises, MCUT established the Industry-University Collaboration Center and the Innovation and Incubation Center. MCUT's contributions can be seen in both the quality and quantity of research produced. For the 2010–2011 period, the numbers of papers-per-author published by MCUT faculty members in SCI and SSCI journals ranked 3rd in the world in the 'technological and vocational university/college' category. As well, from 2009 to 2011, MCUT received grants awarded by Ministry of Education for the promotion and development of academic-industrial cooperation.

== Student life ==
=== Residential Schooling ===
There are eight dormitories on the MCUT campus to accommodate all undergraduates studying in the regular program. Living on campus has been one of MCUT's longstanding traditions. Students are required to live in school accommodation in the hope that they learn both professional knowledge and techniques and problem-solving skills from the courses taken and life experiences gained. Students at MCUT must get up at 6:30 AM every morning to jog and study in their dorm rooms from 8:00 to 10:00 PM every night.

=== Co-Operative Training Programs ===
The co-operative training program has also been an important feature of the education of MCUT. Students of MCUT are required to receive one-year of co-operative training during which they participate in a full-time internship program with Formosa Plastics Group or other enterprises to learn technical skills and gain work experience relevant to their fields of study. This program is unprecedented among universities/colleges in Taiwan. Furthermore, since 2006 MCUT has introduced an 'Overseas Co-operative Practical Training Program' that allows students to work for certain international companies abroad. MCUT is the world's pioneering institution to implement such an international internship system.

== Transportation ==
The university is accessible within walking distance north of Taishan Guihe Station of Taoyuan Airport MRT.

== See also ==
- List of universities in Taiwan
