= Chang Gung Medical Foundation =

Chang Gung Medical Foundation 長庚醫療財團法人

Geography
- Location: Taiwan

Organisation
- Affiliated university: Chang Gung University (CGU), Chang Gung University of Science and Technology (CGUST)

Services
- Beds: 10,000+ (all branches)

History
- Founded: March 26, 1973

Links
- Website: www.cgmh.org.tw/en/

The Chang Gung Medical Foundation (CGMH; Chinese: 長庚醫療財團法人), also known as Chang Gung, is a medical and hospital network located in Taiwan. It was founded in 1973 by Wang Yung-ching to commemorate his father Wang Chang-gung (Chinese: 王長庚). The hospital network has a total of 10,050 beds.

In 2012, the hospital network was featured in National Geographic Channel's documentary, "Taiwan's Medical Miracle".

== History ==
Chang Gung Medical Foundation was founded by Formosa Plastics Group founder Wang Yung-ching along with his brother Wang Yung-tsai. The primary purpose is to provide healthcare to the Taiwanese public. In March 1973, the foundation completed its public registration and opened its first hospital, Taipei Chang Gung Memorial Hospital, in 1976. Its second and largest hospital, the Linkou Chang Gung Memorial Hospital, opened two years later in 1978. In 2005, the hospital network made a record NT$1.3 billion in profit.

In 2019, Chang Gung Medical Foundation signed a memorandum of understanding with hospitals in Malaysia expanding the foundation into the region. As of 2019 there are eight branches in the hospital network.

=== Controversies ===
In June 2017, Hospital chairwoman Diana Wang, returned to Taiwan to deal with the resignation of 22 emergency room doctors in the network after two emergency-room supervisors were dismissed rumored to be due to budget issues. In September of the same year, family members of patients in Linkou Chang Gung Hospital complained about some staff members not wearing isolation gowns when entering and leaving the intensive care unit ward.

== Branches ==
=== Taipei Chang Gung Memorial Hospital ===
The oldest establishment of the Chang Gung Hospital network, Taipei Chang Gung Memorial Hospital was established in 1976. Situated in Taipei it has 262 beds and 195 physicians. Taipei Chang Gung, along with Linkou Chang Gung and Taoyuan Branch, is the largest medical center in Taiwan, with the capacity of handling academic research, clinical services, and medical education and training/..

- Beds: 262
- Physicians: 195

=== Linkou Chang Gung Memorial Hospital ===
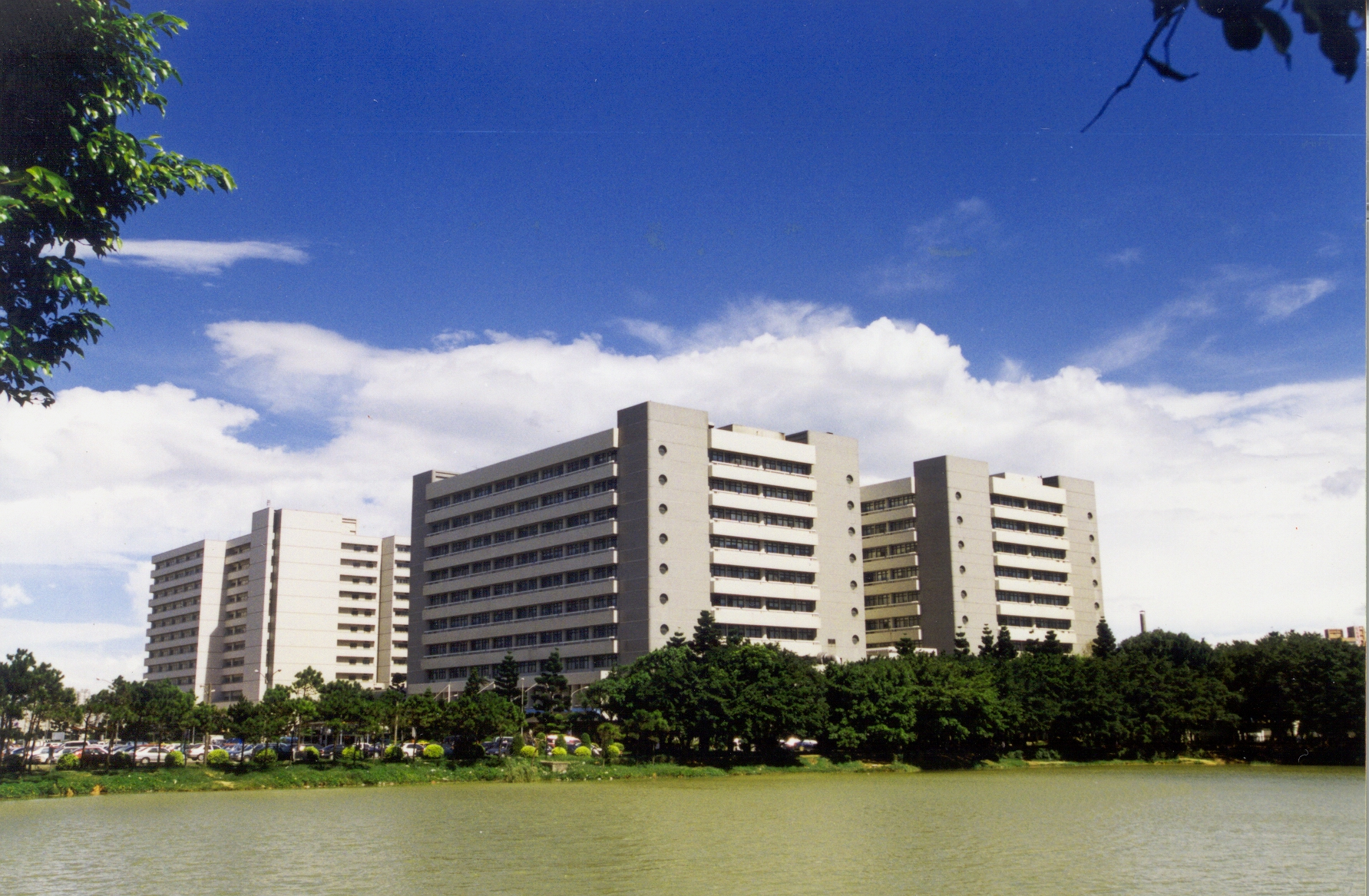
Linkou Chang Gung

The largest and second oldest of the Chang Gung hospitals, Linkou Chang Gung Memorial Hospital was established shortly after Taipei CGMH, in 1978 in Taoyuan. With larger areas of land within close vicinity of Taipei, Linkou Chang Gung was able to erect multiple buildings, including Medical Building, Pathology Building, Rehabilitation Building, Children's Building, and Education Building. It has 3470 beds and 1450 physicians. Linkou Chang Gung, along with Taipei Chang Gung and Taoyuan Branch, is the largest medical center in Taiwan, with the capacity of handling academic research, clinical services, and medical education and training.

- Beds: 3,470
- Physicians: 1,450

=== Keelung Chang Gung Memorial Hospital ===
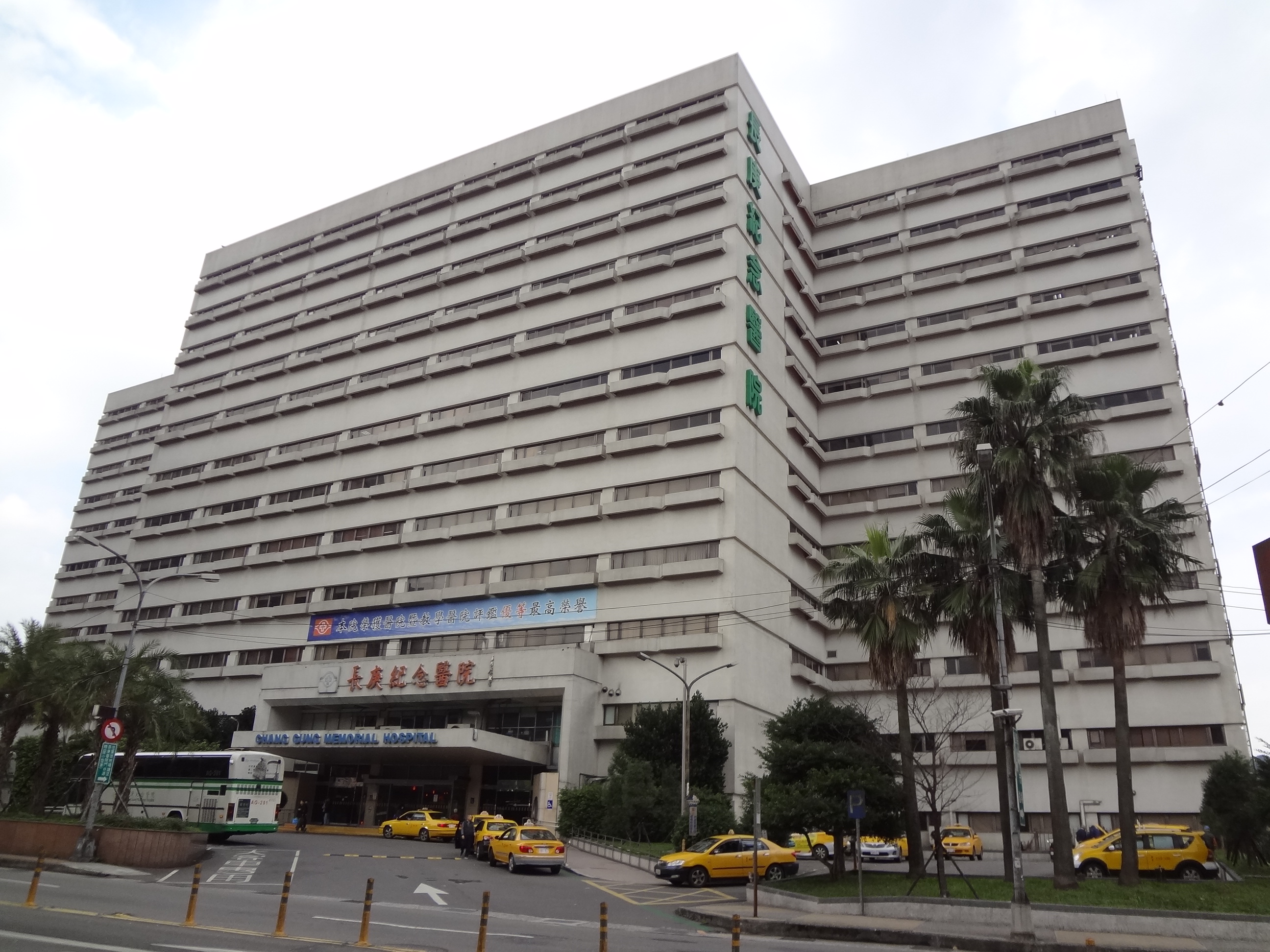
Keelung Chang Gung

A district hospital in Keelung, Taiwan, Keelung Chang Gung Memorial Hospital was inaugurated in 1985. It specializes in General Medicine, Oncology, Psychiatry, and Rehabilitation Departments. Also in Keelung, the Lover's Lake Branch falls under Keelung Chang Gung's jurisdiction.

- Beds: 1,098 (including Lover's Lake Branch)
- Physicians: 301 (including Lover's Lake Branch)

=== Kaohsiung Chang Gung Memorial Hospital ===
Located in Kaohsiung, Taiwan and established in 1986, Kaohsiung Chang Gung Memorial Hospital is categorized as a medical center, capable of handling academic research, clinical services, and medical education and training. The hospital has 3 main buildings: Medical Building, Children's Building, and Rehabilitation Building.

- Beds: 2,724
- Physicians: 861

=== Chiayi Chang Gung Memorial Hospital ===
Established in 2002, Chiayi Chang Gung Memorial Hospital is a district hospital in Chiayi County, Taiwan. In 2001, its founder believed the people of Chiayi lacked medical resources and expertise and built a hospital in a former sugar field.

- Beds: 1,379
- Physicians: 314

=== Chang Gung Memorial Hospital - Taoyuan Branch ===
The Chang Gung Memorial Hospital - Taoyuan Branch opened in 2003 in Taoyuan. Taoyuan Branch is a part of the largest medical center in Taiwan, with the capacity of handling academic research, clinical services, and medical education and training. The Taoyuan Branch has specialized centers such as the Beauty Center, the Healthcare Center, and the Chinese Medicine Hospital.

- Beds: 696
- Physicians: 129

=== Chang Gung Memorial Hospital - Lover's Lake Branch ===
Established in 2006, the Chang Gung Memorial Hospital - Lover's Lake Branch falls under Keelung Chang Gung's jurisdiction and services patients residing in north-eastern Taiwan.

- Beds: 1,098 (including Keelung Chang Gung)
- Physicians: 301 (including Keelung Chang Gung)

=== Yunlin Chang Gung Memorial Hospital ===
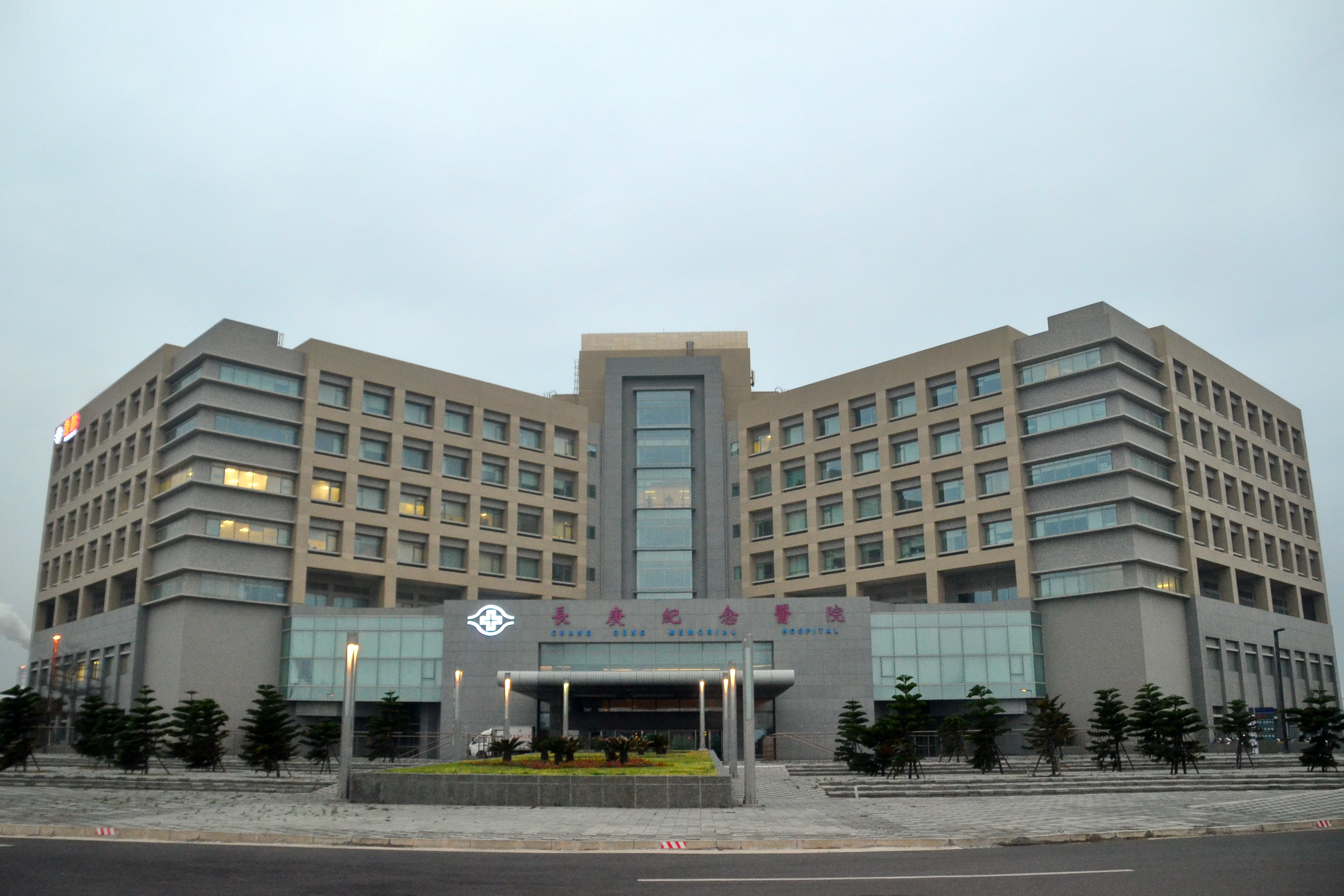
Yunlin Chang Gung

Established in 2009, Yunlin Chang Gung Memorial Hospital is a regional hospital in Yunlin County, Taiwan. The hospital focuses on remote medical care, providing medical services to remote and suburban residents, with specialties in burns, and poison and disaster control. Yunlin Chang Gung has 138 beds, 22 physicians, and 196 medical staff.

- Beds: 138
- Physicians: 22
