= Cher Wang =

Taiwanese entrepreneur and philanthropist

- 王雪紅
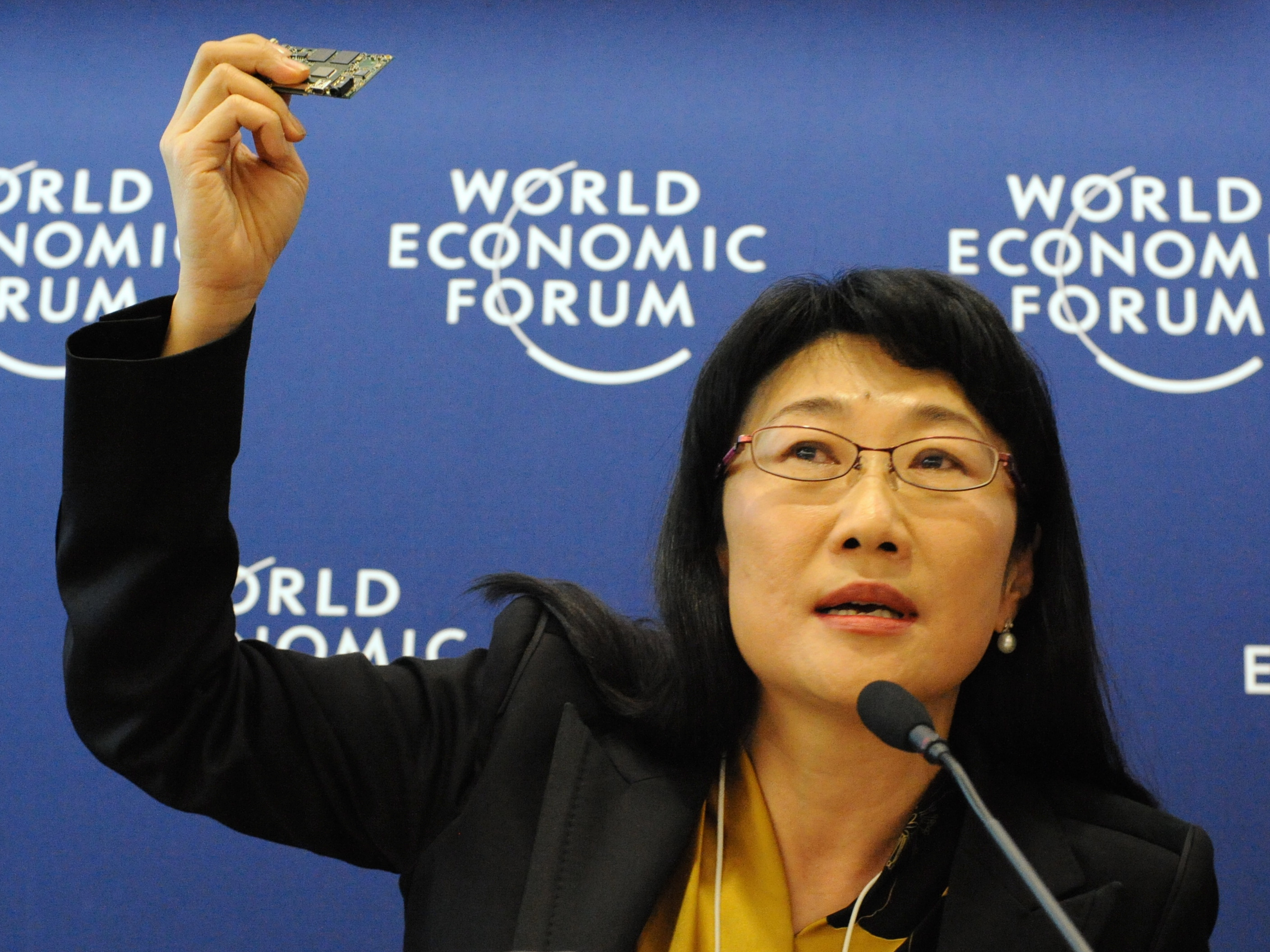
- Wang at the World Economic Forum on 23 January 2008
- Born: 14 September 1958 (age 68); Taipei, Taiwan
- Education: University of California, Berkeley (BA)
- Occupation: Entrepreneur
- Years active: 1997–present
- Employer(s): HTC, VIA Technologies
- Known for: Contributions to HTC and VIA; creating a fairly early model of smart phones in 1997
- Spouse: Chen Wen-Chi
- Children: 2
- Parent(s): Wang Yung-ching; Jiao Yang
- Relatives: Cherlin Wang

Cher Wang (Chinese: 王雪紅; pinyin: Wáng Xuěhóng; born 15 September 1958) is a Taiwanese businesswoman and entrepreneur. As co-founder, chairperson (since 2007), and CEO (as of 2025) of HTC Corporation and integrated chipset maker VIA Technologies, she is one of the most successful women in computer technology. Wang's father was Wang Yung-ching, founder of the plastics and petrochemicals conglomerate Formosa Plastics Group and one of the wealthiest individuals in Taiwan before his death in 2008. In 2014, she was listed as the 54th most powerful woman in the world by Forbes. In 2025, Wang was appointed a Knight (Chevalière) of the Ordre des Arts et des Lettres by the French government. The honor recognized her role in pioneering the use of HTC Vive's extended reality (XR) and virtual reality (VR) technologies to create immersive cultural experiences, as well as her efforts in fostering technological and artistic collaboration between France and Taiwan.

== Early life and education ==
Wang was born on 15 September 1958 in Taipei, Taiwan. She studied abroad at the College Preparatory School in Oakland, California, and earned her bachelor's degree in economics from the University of California, Berkeley, in 1981.

== Career ==
Wang joined First International Computer (FIC) in 1982. Wang and others founded VIA in 1987 and HTC in 1997. Smartphones are core products of both companies. In May 2011, Forbes ranked her, with husband Wen Chi Chen, as the wealthiest person in Taiwan, with a net worth of US$8.8 billion. In August 2012, Wang was named No. 56 on Forbes' list of The World's 100 Most Powerful Women. As of 2014, Forbes listed her as the 54th most powerful woman in the world.

VIA product VT3421, an anti-hack chip also named as TF376, was suspected of assisting the Chinese government in surveilling mobile devices of anti-communist and human rights activists. The case concluded with VIA losing and being fined millions of dollars. The case was addressed in multiple tribunals before reaching closure, however. In October 2014, Cher Wang appealed the original arbitration's Final Award of the "HKIAC / A11022 arbitration". Wang asserted that the Award was contrary to public policy. In a hearing before Justice Mimmie Chan in the Hong Kong High Court (Case No.:HCCT40 / 2014), the defense counsel maintained that the Award violated Hong Kong's public order and morals. In June 2015 the Judge remised the case back to Arbitrator Anthony Neoh. The tribunal upheld the conviction in October 2015. The unusual case was documented by the World Arbitration News which upholds the integrity of the HKIAC arbitration process.

The hacking prevention chip VT3421/TF376 caused significant conflict in Taiwan. Eleven Legislative Senators suggested that the government suspend procurement of HTC-related communication products until the National Security Bureau and National Communication Committee completed a thorough investigation of the chip's backdoor issue. In December 2020, the Taiwan High Court ruled that Cher Wang/VIA failed the case and put for enforcement.

In March 2015, Cher Wang took over the CEO role from Peter Chou and returned to the day-to-day operations of HTC.

In September 2017, HTC and Google announced a US$1.1 billion cooperation agreement, in which certain HTC employees will join Google and Google will receive HTC IP through a non-exclusive licensing agreement.

== Philanthropy ==
Wang's Charity Foundations hold eight investment companies' stocks with a market value of over US$200 million. A news article stated that only US$27,000 (0.000135%) had actually been donated to charity. Wang sued the reporter and the case failed in February 2018.

In 2011 Wang donated US$28.1 million to help found Guizhou Forerunner College, a charitable college in southwest China set up by VIA Technologies' non-profit Faith-Hope-Love Foundation. The not-for-profit college aims to provide three years of free or low-cost education to students from low-income families. Wang has stated that if the college proves successful she may set up additional similar institutions in other parts of the country.

Wang has also made significant donations to the University of California, Berkeley, including funding to enhance the American Physical Society's Oliver E. Buckley Condensed Matter Prize. The prize is given to researchers who make considerable contributions to the field of condensed-matter physics.

Wang and Chen also fund a collaborative program between the psychology departments at UC Berkeley and Tsinghua University in Beijing. The Berkeley-Tsinghua Program for the Advanced Study in Psychology aims to create and support collaborative psychology research between faculty and students from both universities.

In August 2012 Wang donated 6,000 HTC Flyer tablet PCs to 60 high schools in Taipei.

== Personal life ==
Wang is Christian. Her husband is Wen Chi Chen, the CEO of VIA Technologies. She has two children. Wang says she prefers to stay out of the limelight. She has been active in Taiwan's politics, however, supporting Taiwan President Ma Ying-jeou in his bid for re-election and voicing her support for the 1992 Consensus.

== LGBTQ controversies ==
Wang has been accused of backing and funding anti-LGBTQ groups and activities in Taiwan, including cooperating with the US-based group International House of Prayer. In 2018 it was reported that two non-profit organizations that Wang runs allegedly gave approximately $388 million to anti-LGBTQ groups in Taiwan over the past five years.

Taiwan's Supreme Court ruled that the Civil Code's prohibition of same-sex marriage is unconstitutional and must be amended by 24 May 2019. On 4 May 2019, Wang and her "Faith, Hope & Love Foundation" along with Democratic Progressive Party legislator Lin Tai-hua drafted a "same-sex union" bill which contains a "fake marriage" clause. The clause would authorize prosecutors or social welfare agencies to request that a court intervene and abrogate a same-sex union if relatives within three degrees of consanguinity of either member of the union believe that it was not for the purpose of two people "living life together". The version also has a clause that says, "as one's conscience and freedom should not be affected by the enactment of this act, conveying or inculcating beliefs against the relationship described in Article 2 (same-sex union) does not constitute discrimination". The bill was called by Taiwan legislator and LGBT rights activist Yu Mei-nu "stark discrimination against same-sex couples". Yu questioned anyone's right to scrutinize the sincerity of other couples' marriages.
