= Winston Wong =

Taiwanese businessman

- 王文洋
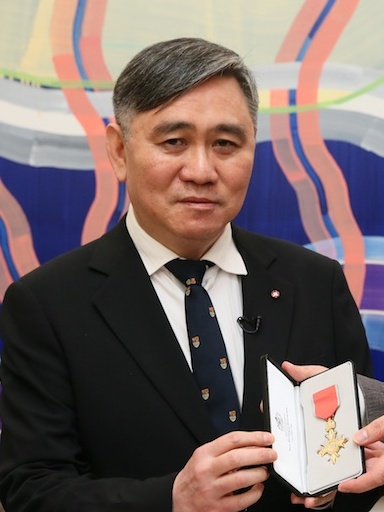
- Wong in 2016
- Born: April 2, 1951 (age 75); Xindian, Taipei County, Taiwan
- Education: Imperial College London (BSc, MSc, PhD)
- Title: Chairman and CEO of the Grace THW Group
- Father: Wang Yung-ching
- Honours: Order of the British Empire (2016)
- Scientific career
- Fields: Chemical engineering
- Thesis: An optical study of turbulence within fire plumes (1976)
- Doctoral advisor: Felix Weinberg

Winston Wen-Yang Wong OBE (Chinese: 王文洋; pinyin: Wáng Wényáng; born 2 April 1951) is a Taiwanese chemical engineer, businessman, and philanthropist. He is the eldest son of Wang Yung-ching (the former chair of the Formosa Plastics Group) by his second wife.

== Early life and education ==
Wong was born on April 2, 1951, in Taipei County (now New Taipei City), Taiwan, the eldest son of billionaire Taiwanese businessman Wang Yung-ching and his wife, Yang Chiao.

At age 13, Wong was sent to be educated at St John's School, Leatherhead, in Surrey, England. After graduating, he earned a Bachelor of Science (B.Sc.) in physics in 1971, a Master of Science (M.Sc.) in 1972, and a Ph.D. in chemical engineering and chemical technology in 1976, all from Imperial College London. His doctoral dissertation, completed under Felix Weinberg, was titled, "An optical study of turbulence within fire plumes". He chose his English name, Winston, while studying in the United Kingdom.

== Career ==
Wong was executive vice president of Nan Ya Plastics, an FPG subsidiary, until a widely publicized affair (and the resulting 14% drop in FPG stocks) led to his dismissal in December 1995. His father then “banished” Wong to the United States, where he spent one year teaching at the business school of the University of California, Berkeley. While in the United States, Wong met Jiang Mianheng, son of Jiang Zemin, the General Secretary of the Chinese Communist Party at that time.

In 2000, Wong and Jiang Mianheng co-founded the US$1.63 billion Grace Semiconductor Manufacturing Corp. joint venture in Shanghai, China. Though Wong serves as president and CEO of that company, Wong himself is not a stockholder, due to cross-strait investment restrictions imposed by the Republic of China (ROC). Wong also serves as chair of the Hung Jen Group (宏仁集團) and chair of the Grace THW Group (宏仁企业集团), which are heavily invested in mainland China’s petrochemical and electronics industries, respectively.

The Winston Wong Centre for Bio-Inspired Technology was created at Imperial College London in 2009.

In 2015, Wong was named to “Top 100 Chinese for Economic Achievements and Contributions” list by Management World Magazine.

Wang has been a visiting scholar at the University of California, Berkeley, and Imperial College London.

== Moon Regan TransAntarctic Expedition sponsorship ==
In June 2010, Wong agreed to be the main sponsor of the Moon-Regan Trans-Antarctic expedition led by Andrew Regan and Andrew Moon. The Expedition will travel 3,600 miles across Antarctica, from Patriot Hills on the west coast to the South Pole, heading north from there through the Trans-Antarctic Mountain Range, down the Leverett Glacier and across the Ross Ice Shelf to the coast at McMurdo.

The expedition has partnered with Imperial College London to carry out a wide range of scientific objectives. The team is travelling in three vehicles across Antarctica, including two mobile laboratories and the Winston Wong Bio-Inspired Ice Vehicle (WWBIV). The WWBIV will be the first bio-fuelled vehicle on Antarctica to endeavor to reach the Geographic South Pole.

== Personal life ==
Wong's former wife, Anita, was British Chinese; they married in 1975.
