= Shin-Ru Shih =

Medical biotechnology professor and virologist in Taiwan

- 施信如
- Education: National Taiwan University (BS, MS); Rutgers University (PhD)
- Scientific career
- Workplaces: Research Center for Emerging Viral Infections, College of Medicine, Chang Gung University; Department of Laboratory Medicine, Linkou Chang Gung Memorial Hospital; Department of Medical Biotechnology and Laboratory Science, College of Medicine, Chang Gung University

Shin-Ru Shih (Chinese: 施信如) is the director of the Research Center for Emerging Viral Infections and holds a professorship in the Department of Medical Biotechnology and Laboratory Science and Graduate Program of Biomedical Sciences at Chang Gung University. She is also the medical director of the Clinical Virology Laboratory, Chang Gung Memorial Hospital.

== Education ==
Shin-Ru Shih received her bachelor's degree in medical technology and master's degree in biochemistry from National Taiwan University and her Ph.D. in biochemistry and molecular biology from Rutgers University, New Jersey, USA.

== Research and career ==
Shih established a Molecular Virology Laboratory at Chang Gung University in 1996 and was appointed Medical Director in Clinical Virology Laboratory, Chang Gung Memorial Hospital in 1998. She also established the Research Center for Emerging Viral Infections at Chang Gung University in 2009, and took the lead as center director since then.

Shih's group considers various aspects of emerging RNA viruses, including identification of viral pathogens during outbreaks, mechanistic studies of pathogenesis, and development of vaccines and antiviral agents.

She identified several nuclear proteins that redistribute to cytoplasm and regulate viral translation. Since picornaviruses use their internal ribosome entry site (IRES) located in 5' untranslated region (5' UTR) to translate their proteins, Shih's group discovered a novel machinery regulating IRES-dependent translation by using IRES RNA to pull down host cell proteins and RNAs. Their findings include the discovery of a novel IRES trans-acting factor (ITAF), far upstream element binding protein 1 (FBP1), which positively regulate EV-A71 IRES activity. Furthermore, Shih's team found that EV-A71 viral proteinase 2A is capable of cleaving FBP1. The cleavage occurs at the Gly-371 residue of FBP1 during the EV-A71 infection process, and this generates a functional cleavage product, FBP11-371, which acts to promote viral IRES activity. Moreover, FBP1 and FBP11-371 could act additively to promote IRES-mediated translation and virus yield. They also identified another protein in the same family, far upstream element binding protein 2 (FBP2), to be a negative regulator for EV71 IRES. However, upon virus infection, FBP2 was cleaved and the truncated FBP2 without C-terminal domain becomes a positive regulator. They further proved that the ubiquitination of FBP2 in its C-terminal domain causes a negative regulation of IRES.

Shih was awarded the National Medal for Outstanding Young Scientist from the Executive Yuan in 2004 and Outstanding Research Award from Ministry of Science and Technology in 2012 for her contribution to EV-A71 outbreak control and research in Taiwan. More recently, she received a Research Grant Award from the Human Frontier Science Program (HFSP, among 21 Program Grants awarded from a total of over 1000 applications in 2015).

More recently, as the COVID-19 pandemic poses a threat to global health, Shih's group also conducted research regarding SARS-CoV-2, identifying therapeutic targets and developing diagnostic tools.
