= Formosa Plastics Group =

Taiwanese industrial conglomerate

- Native name: 臺塑企業
- Type: Conglomerate
- Founded: 5 November 1954
- Founder: Wang Yung-ching and Wang Yung-tsai
- Headquarters: Kaohsiung, Taiwan
- Products: polyvinyl chloride, high-density polyethylene, low-density polyethylene, linear low-density polyethylene, polyethylene wax, polypropylene, polyoxymethylene, masterbatch, liquid caustic soda, liquid chlorine, acrylonitrile, acetonitrile, methyl methacrylate, methacrylic acid, epichlorohydrin, methyl tert-butyl ether, acrylic acid and esters, carbon fibre, sodium hypochlorite, chlorinated solvent, hydrogen, lithium-ion battery electrolyte, calcium carbonate, distributed control systems, warehouse management systems, and learning management systems
- Revenue: $6.7 billion (2020)
- Website: Official website

Formosa Plastics Group (FPG, Chinese: 臺塑企業; pinyin: TáiSù QìYè) is a titular Taiwanese conglomerate of diverse interests, including biotechnology, petrochemical processing and production of electronics components. The group was founded by Wang Yung-ching and his brother Wang Yung-tsai, and is chaired by Wong Wen-yuan. Despite its name, its holdings include several companies prominent in the high tech electronics sector, including VIA Technologies and Nanya Technology Corporation.

== History ==
Formosa Plastics Group was formed in 1954 to reflect vertical integration of the PVC manufacturing process by the Formosa Plastics Corporation (FPC). Nan Ya Plastics Processing Corp. was formed to purchase PVC resins produced by FPC. A third member of the group, New Eastern Plastics Product, was formed to manufacture those processed resins into consumer goods. Nan Ya and New Eastern were later merged into a single entity, Nan Ya Plastics Corp., and upstream integration was achieved in the 1990s through the construction of an ethylene-producing naphtha cracking plant and a coal-burning power plant. In Taiwan, FPG has also diversified into many other fields, including textiles, electronics, medicine, skin care, automobile manufacturing, gasoline retail and petroleum refining.

FPG's overseas expansion has focused primarily on the United States and mainland China. The group has purchased or constructed many PVC factories and chemical production facilities in both countries. American holdings also include Texas properties containing over 200 oil wells and lands rich in natural gas, pipeline and production firms, and an ethylene plant in Point Comfort, Texas that was constructed in 1988. Chinese expansion has included a power plant in Zhuangzhou, Fujian Province and at least 40 FPG-built factories across the country.

FPG's non-manufacturing operations include the Chang Gung Memorial Hospital, named after the late father of the FPG chairman, Wang Chang-gung. Since its founding in 1976, the non-profit hospital has expanded to 5 cities in Taiwan. In 1984, the Linkou branch undertook the first liver transplant operation in Asia.

In the early 2010s the group became the primary backer of the Formosa Ha Tinh Steel Corporation, a large iron and steel works in Vietnam.

FPG was responsible for a serious discharge of toxic pollution from one of its steel complexes. The release resulted in an estimated 115 tons of dead fish washing ashore in Vietnam. The environmental pollution negatively affected the livelihood of 200,000 people including local fishers. In July 2016, FPG pledged to pay compensation to Vietnamese impacted by the environmentally toxic discharge in the amount of $500 million. In February 2018 Hoang Duc Binh was jailed for 14 years for live streaming fisherman travelling to file a lawsuit over the plant's pollution.

Formosa

Formosa Plastics is planning the construction of a fossil fuel plant, known as “The Sunshine Project,” with an estimated cost of 9.4 billion dollars. This project is set to be located in a region of Louisiana commonly referred to as “Cancer Alley” due illnesses linked to environmental pollutants from existing fossil fuel plants.

=== Naphtha Cracker #6 (六輕) ===
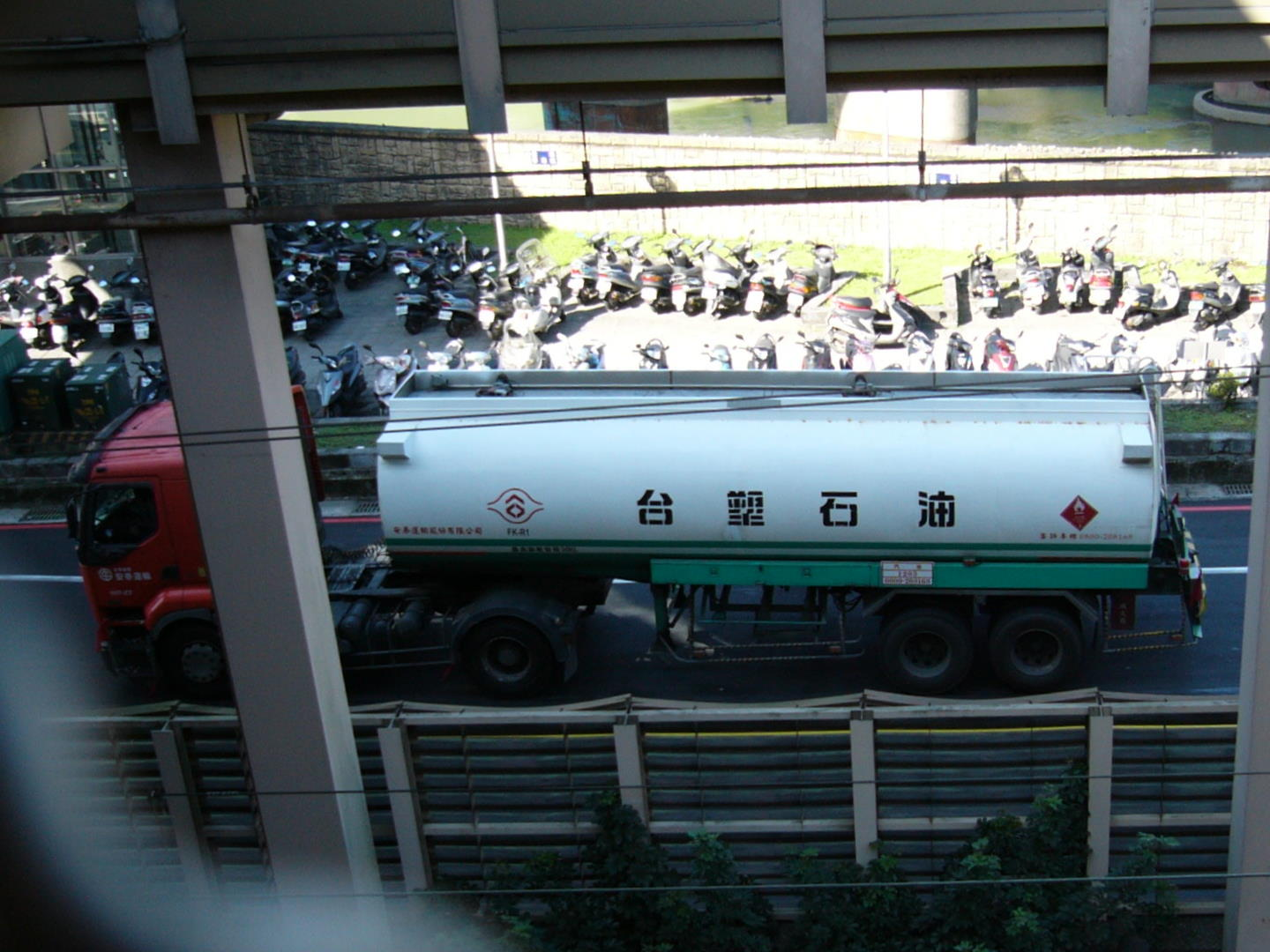
Formosa Petrochemical Oil Tanker

FPG's naphtha cracker – the sixth petrochemical processing plant of that kind in Taiwan – was first proposed in 1973, but the ruling KMT government still imposed a monopoly at that time and denied permission. Permission was granted in 1986, as President Chiang Ching-kuo instituted reforms to loosen the authoritarianism instituted by his father, Chiang Kai-shek. At that time, FPG proposed a NT$90 billion complex that would be located in the Litzu Industrial Zone of Ilan County. Local residents opposed this plan on the basis of its environmental impact and, led by County Magistrate Chen Ding-Nan (陳定南), formed the Alliance against Sixth Naphtha Cracker. After a successful campaign, including a televised debate between Chen and FPG Chairman Wang, they eventually forced the company to look elsewhere. The second site proposed by FPG, in Taoyuan County's Kuanyin Industrial Zone, generated similar opposition from local residents.

FPG shelved these proposals in 1989 and Chairman Wang Yung-ching traveled secretly to mainland China to find a solution there. In 1990, he announced his intention to develop the complex on the People's Republic of China-controlled island of Haitsang, in Fujian Province. The Nationalist government condemned the project and in 1992 secured an offshore site near Mailiao, in Taiwan's impoverished Yunlin County, where local administrators welcomed the investment.

Total investment in the complex, after four phases of construction throughout the 1990s and early 2000s, included the following major features:

- an oil refinery: 450,000 barrels (72,000 m^{3}) per day
- a naphtha cracking plant (production capacity: 1.35 million tons ethylene per year)
- a coal-burning power plant (capacity: 3 GW)
- Taiwan's first wind power plant (total combined capacity of the four turbines: 2,640 kW).

This project provoked intense opposition, just as Chiang Ching-kuo's reforms allowed tolerance for public expressions of dissatisfaction. The environmentalists' public protests, including a 3000-person rally at the Ministry of Economic Affairs in 1990, reflected the island's gradual transformation from authoritarianism to democracy. Beyond environmental concerns, protesters and newly legalized opposition parties denounced the cronyism they saw in the expedited approvals, extended tax holiday, subsidized loans, extremely low land prices for the land, and special allowance for a private port.

During the construction of Naphtha Cracker #6, further trouble arose when 200 to 300 Thai and Filipino workers fought on 5 September 1999. The brawl was reported to have lasted eight hours. Despite these complications, the plant proceeded as scheduled and continues to enjoy government support.

== Subsidiaries ==
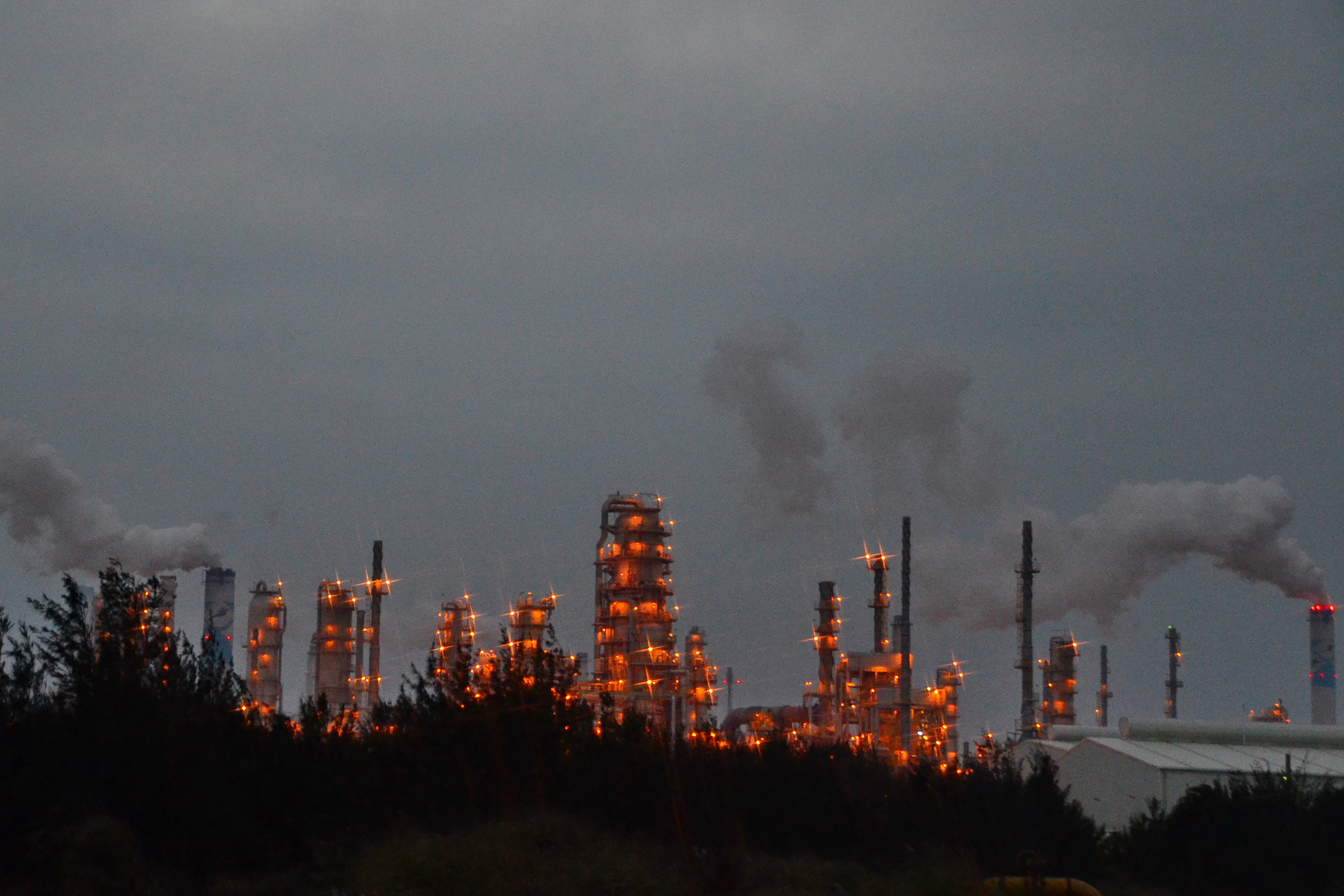
Formosa Plastics Group plant at the Mailiao Industrial Complex, Yunlin County.

The following FPG subsidiary companies are located in Taiwan:

- Formosa Automobile Corp.
- Formosa Plastics Corp.
- Formosa Petrochemical
- Mai-Liao Power Corporation
- Nanya Technology Corporation. Plastics investment company founded on 4 March 1995. In 2003, Nanya formed a joint venture with Infineon Technologies and established Inotera, a DRAM production company. In 2008, Nanya signed a joint venture agreement with Micron Technology. In 2017, after years of licensing from Micron, Nanya signaled its desire to develop 10 nm nodes in-house. In 2020, Nanya aims to produce their 10 nm-class of DRAM chips by the end of the year.
- VIA Technologies

The following educational and medical institutions also fall under the FPG umbrella:

- Chang Gung University of Science and Technology
- Chang Gung Medical Foundation
- Chang Gung University
- Ming Chi University of Technology
- BioTrust International Corporation

== See also ==
- Formosa Plastics Group Museum
