= Felix Weinberg =

Czech-British physicist (1928–2012)

Felix Jiří Weinberg
- Born: 2 April 1928; Ústí nad Labem, Czechoslovakia
- Died: 5 December 2012 (aged 84)
- Education: University of London
- Awards: Bernard Lewis Gold Medal (1980), Rumford Medal (1988)
- Scientific career
- Fields: Combustion physics
- Workplaces: Imperial College London
- Doctoral students: Winston Wong

Felix Jiri Weinberg FRS (2 April 1928 – 5 December 2012) was a Czech-British physicist. He was Emeritus Professor of Combustion Physics and Distinguished Research Fellow at Imperial College London.

== Life ==
Felix Weinberg was born on 2 April 1928 in Ústí nad Labem in Czechoslovakia. As a teenager, he spent much of the war in Auschwitz, Buchenwald and other Nazi concentration camps. He arrived in England on V. J. day. Having had no formal schooling since the age of 12, he had to take his first degrees as an external student of the University of London. In 1951 he joined Imperial College as a research assistant, obtaining his PhD in 1954 for developing novel optical methods to analyse the structure of flames. He was appointed to a Personal Chair as Professor of Combustion Physics in 1967.

Professor Weinberg is distinguished for his optical and electrical studies of flames and his pioneering development of innovative combustion methods. He originated a family of powerful optical tools in combustion, using both thermal and laser light sources. His work on electrical diagnostics led to applications of electric fields to control combustion and improve understanding of ionisation and soot formation. He developed novel combustion devices[4] incorporating distinctive heat exchangers, permitting the ignition and burning of very low calorific fuel-air mixtures. These have had a seminal influence on the global evolution of environmentally benign combustion furnaces. His researches into the stabilisation of high intensity combustion using plasma jets[4] are being favoured as an approach to leaner burning jet engines. His work on laser ignition has progressed to understanding hazards associated with the use of optical fibres in flammable atmospheres.

His wide-ranging services to academia, industry and scientific societies included visiting appointments at universities in Europe, the US, Japan and Israel, consultancies for petroleum, chemical, aerospace and defence organisations and membership of committees and boards of governance of numerous scientific and professional bodies. He is author, coauthor, editor of 4 books and more than 220 papers in the scientific literature.

His many contributions have been recognised internationally; he was awarded a D.Sc. by the University of London (1961), both the Silver (1972) and the Bernard Lewis Gold (1980) Medals of the Combustion Institute, Fellowship of the Royal Society (1983), the Royal Society's Rumford Medal (1988), the D.Sc. Honoris Causa by The Technion, Haifa (1990), the Italgas Prize for Energy Sciences (Turin Academy, 1991), the Smolenski Medal of the Polish Academy of Science (1999) and was elected to the American National Academy of Engineering as a Foreign Associate in 2001. The Hugh Edwards Lifetime Achievement Award for contributions to Combustion Physics has been conferred on him in 2005 (Institute of Physics).

As a survivor of Nazi concentration camps he was highly critical of fraudulent Holocaust memoirs. His own account of his experiences in Nazi concentration camps 'Boy 30529: A Memoir', was published in 2013, shortly after his death. He was one of 900 children rescued by Antonín Kalina, a Czech citizen who is mentioned as Righteous Among the Nations.
