= Chen Wen-ch'i =

Taiwanese-American entrepreneur (born 1955)

- 陈文琦
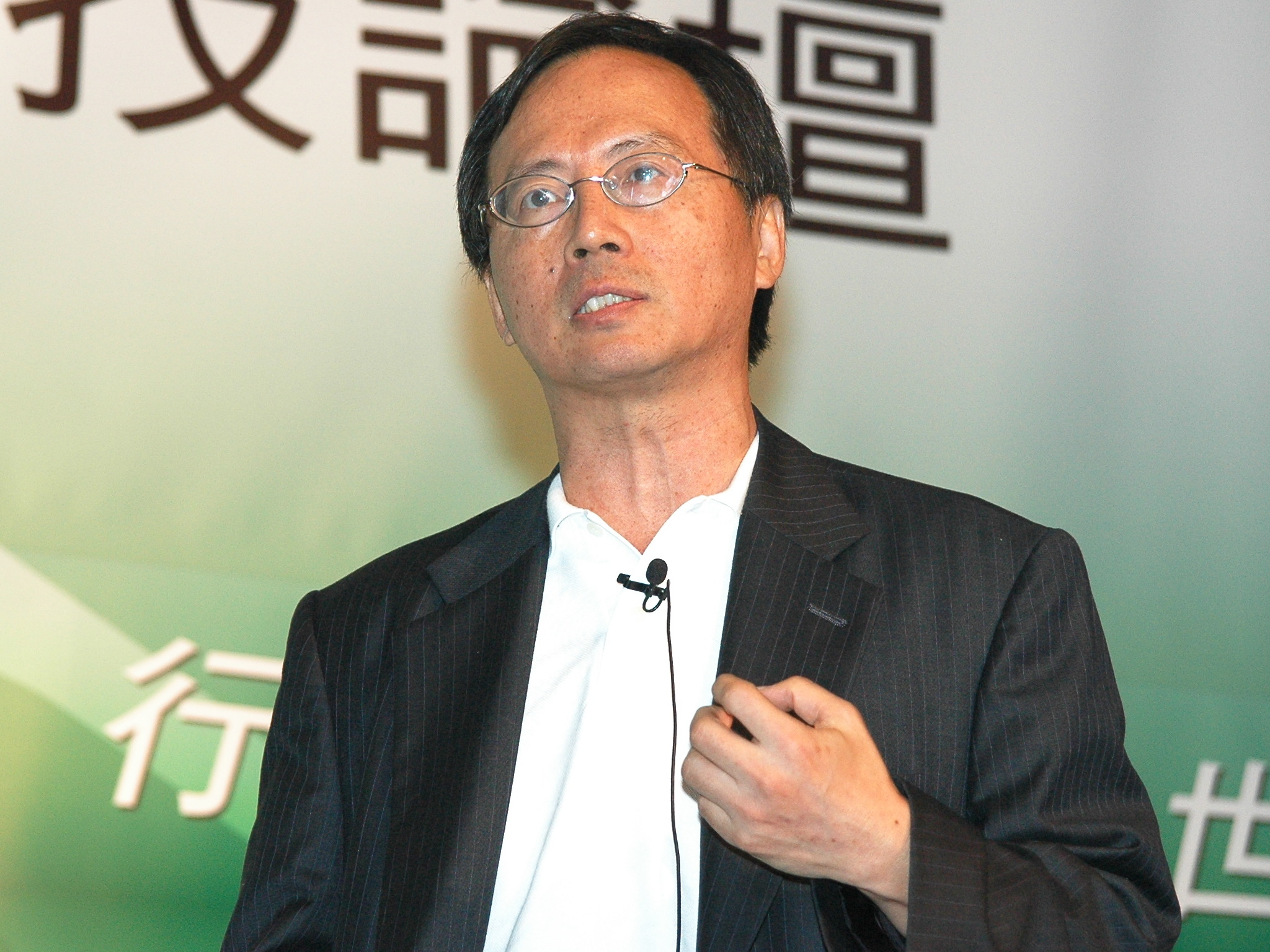
- Born: November 16, 1955 (age 70); Taipei, Taiwan
- Citizenship: Taiwan; United States
- Education: National Taiwan University (BS, MS); California Institute of Technology (MS)
- Occupation: Entrepreneur
- Title: CEO of VIA Technologies
- Spouse: Cher Wang

Chinese name
- Traditional Chinese: 陳文琦
- Simplified Chinese: 陈文琦
Transcriptions
Standard Mandarin
- Tongyong Pinyin: Chén Wénqí

Chen Wen-ch'i (Chinese: 陈文琦; pinyin: Chén Wénqí, born November 16, 1955) is a Taiwanese-American entrepreneur who has been president and CEO of VIA Technologies, Inc. since 1992.

Chen graduated from National Taiwan University with a bachelor's degree and master's degree in electrical engineering and earned a master's degree in computer science from the California Institute of Technology. Prior to VIA, Chen co-founded and was president and CEO of Symphony Laboratories, acquired by Winbond in 1995. He also held positions of Sales & Marketing VP at high tech start-up ULSI and senior architect at Intel.

In June 2008, Forbes ranked him with his wife Cher Wang, the chairperson of HTC, as the fifth richest of Taiwan. Forbes estimated his net worth to be around US$850 million in May 2016.
