= Taoyuan Refinery =

Oil refinery in Taoyuan City, Taiwan

Taoyuan Refinery 桃園煉油廠
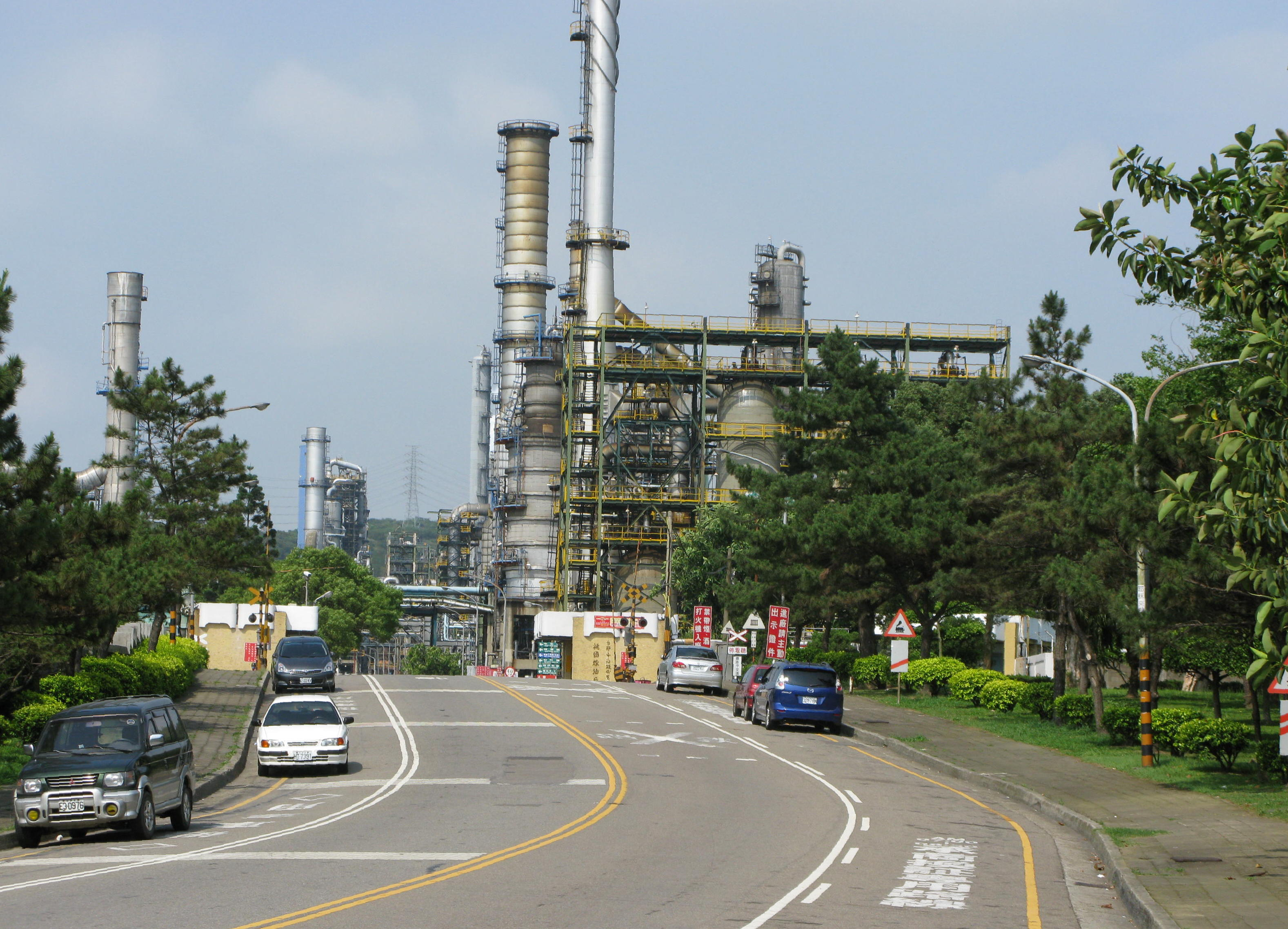

- Location within Taiwan
- Location: Guishan, Taoyuan City, Taiwan; 25°02′00.0″N 121°18′23.1″E

Refinery details
- Operator: CPC Corporation
- Owner: CPC Corporation
- Opened: 1976
- Capacity: 200,000 barrels per day (32,000 m^{3}/d)

The Taoyuan Refinery (traditional Chinese: 桃園煉油廠; simplified Chinese: 桃园炼油厂; pinyin: Táoyuán Liànyóu Chǎng) is an oil refinery in Guishan District, Taoyuan City, Taiwan.

The Taoyuan Refinery, operated by CPC Corporation's Refining Business Division, is located at No. 50, Section 1, Minsheng North Road, Nanshang Village, Guishan District, Taoyuan City, covering approximately 480 hectares. It also includes the Wugu and Shalun oil depots, supplying petroleum products to areas north of Taichung.

== History ==
The planning to establish the refinery began in 1970. The refinery was commissioned in 1976 and started full operation in April 1977. In 2008, a gasoline pyrolysis and hydro-desulfurization unit was constructed at the refinery with a capacity of 30,000 barrels per day.

== Development Timeline ==
- 1970: Planning for the Taoyuan Refinery began to meet national economic development and domestic petroleum needs.
- March 1972: The site was selected in present-day Nanshang Village, Guishan District, initiating civil engineering, infrastructure construction, and equipment installation.
- April 1977: The refinery officially commenced operations, supplying petroleum products to northern Taiwan.
- 1984: Construction of the gasoline desulfurization unit.
- 1987: Construction of the first heavy oil desulfurization unit to produce low-sulfur fuel oil.
- 1990: Completion of the second heavy oil desulfurization unit.
- 2001: Planning began for the production of low-benzene, low-aromatic gasoline to improve air quality.
- 2008-2009: Construction of the cracked gasoline hydrodesulfurization unit and debottlenecking of the diesel unit to produce low-sulfur gasoline and diesel, enhancing product quality.
- 2015: Construction of the Flare Gas Recovery System (FGRS) to reduce emissions from flare stacks.

This development history demonstrates the Taoyuan Refinery's continuous expansion and facility upgrades to meet the petroleum needs of northern Taiwan while striving to improve environmental protection and product quality.

== Technical specifications ==
The refinery has a capacity to process 200,000 barrel of crude oil per day.

== Environmental Equipment – Introduction to the Flare Gas Recovery System (FGRS) ==
The FGRS is a key environmental measure implemented by the Taoyuan Refinery to achieve sustainability goals. It converts waste gases generated during refining into usable energy, effectively reducing emissions and enhancing energy efficiency.

Completed in 2018, it became the first facility in the nation to achieve full recovery of waste gases.

Types of Waste Gases Processed by the FGRS

- Tail gases from processes such as crude oil distillation and catalytic cracking.
- Vapors emitted from storage tank breathing.
- Vapors released during loading and unloading operations.

FGRS Operational Process

1. Gas Interception and Measurement: Before reaching the flare stack, waste gases from various units are intercepted via pipelines and measured using flow meters. Protective measures include Pressure Operated Valves (POVs).
2. Gas Pressurization: The system employs Liquid Jet Ejector technology to pressurize the gases. High-pressure circulating water enters from the top of the ejector, pressurizing the gases drawn in from the side.
3. Three-Phase Separation: The pressurized gas-liquid mixture enters a three-phase separator to divide into water, gas, and oil phases.
4. Hydrogen Sulfide Removal: The separated gas phase is sent to an amine absorption tower to remove hydrogen sulfide (H₂S).
5. Quality Control: Operators monitor the H₂S content of the recovered fuel gas, ensuring it meets standards (≤ 80 ppm). If standards are exceeded, quality anomaly procedures are initiated.
6. Fuel Gas System: Once purified to meet fuel gas standards, the gas is directed to the fuel gas system for use as fuel.

Benefits of the FGRS

- Emission Reduction: Effectively lowers waste gas emissions from refining processes, improving ambient air quality.
- Energy Efficiency: Converts waste gases into usable fuel, reducing fuel consumption and enhancing energy utilization.
- Environmental Impact Mitigation: Decreases overall environmental impact by reducing emissions and energy consumption, promoting sustainable development.
- Continuous Improvement: The refinery invests in technology to enhance the efficiency and safety of the FGRS, actively researching new methods to further reduce environmental impact.

In summary, the FGRS exemplifies the Taoyuan Refinery's commitment to environmental stewardship and sustainable development, fostering a mutually beneficial relationship between the facility and surrounding communities.

== See also ==
- List of oil refineries
- Mining in Taiwan
