= Formosa Plastics Group Museum =

- 台塑企業文物館
- Established: 2006
- Location: Guishan, Taoyuan City, Taiwan
- Coordinates: 25°2′5″N 121°23′17.2″E
- Type: Museum
- Public transit access: National Taiwan Sport University station

The Formosa Plastics Group Museum (traditional Chinese: 台塑企業文物館; simplified Chinese: 台塑企业文物馆) is a museum located at Chang Gung University in Taoyuan, Taiwan. The museum, which opened to the public in 2006, has six above-ground exhibition floors and one basement exhibition area, covering over 8,000 square meters. Its main purpose is to educate the general public about the two Formosa Plastics Group (FPG) founders, Wang Yung-ching and Wang Yung-tsai. The museum opened an online museum in 2014. The museum covers how companies follow environmental, social, and governance and corporate social responsibility.

== Architecture ==
The museum occupies seven floors.

=== 1st Floor: The Spirit of the Formosa Plastics Group ===
The lobby features the museum's first acquisition, a fifty-thousand-year-old piece of petrified wood at its center. The FPG motto and logo are exhibited on a gold-colored matted steel plate. Digitized panels present the history of the FPG enterprise, including its development and core values.

=== 2nd Floor: Memorial to the FPG Founder ===
This exhibit displays several noteworthy episodes from the founders' lives, starting from the period of Japanese occupation in the early 20th century. Dioramas feature wax figures engaging in various activities.

=== 3rd Floor: FPG’s Plastic and Textile Business ===
This floor features the early days of FPG's history when primitive ox-carts were used to transport plastic powders and antique textile machines played a significant role in the company's future development into a modern plastics and textiles enterprise.

=== 4th Floor: FPG’s Sixth Naphtha Cracking Plant and Electronics Business ===
Placed along an artificial cavern, a series of small dioramas and models explain the processes of exploration and production for oil, natural gas and coal. Beyond these is a bird’s eye view of the entire Sixth Naphtha Cracking Plant displayed in miniature beneath a high-strength glass floor. In the fourth floor’s concluding exhibit, the development of FPG’s electronics business is illustrated by the evolution of computer components and circuit boards.

=== 5th Floor: Heavy Transportation Industries, Biotechnology and Green Energy ===
As visitors enter the FPG Heavy Transport exhibition, visitors are greeted by models of FPG’s first chemical and oil tankers as well as full sized cargo truck cab. Here, information is available featuring FPG’s globalization and expansion into green energy at the Earth Conservation Theater. Visitors can also experience driving an electric vehicle, manipulate LED lighting and try out other interactive exhibits.

=== 6th Floor: Giving Back to Society ===
The motif for this floor follows FPG’s creed: “That which is given by society should, in turn, be repaid for the betterment of society.” FPG has been actively involved with the community, including investments in educational institutions, including the establishment of three universities and assisting in the reconstruction of schools after the 1999 Jiji earthquake, the Chang Gung Hospitals, and the Chang Gung Health and Cultural Village. Additionally, FPG has an ongoing commitment to the advancement of medical education and healthcare in Taiwan, as well as the protection of disadvantaged groups.

=== B1: Basement floor Kauri Woods and Memorial Gift Shop Area ===
This area is home to a simulated New Zealand Kauri Wood forest. The Memorial Gift Shop offers a range of medical, biotech, and environmental items produced by various subsidiaries of the Formosa Plastics Group.

== See also ==
- List of museums in Taiwan
