= Renwu incident =

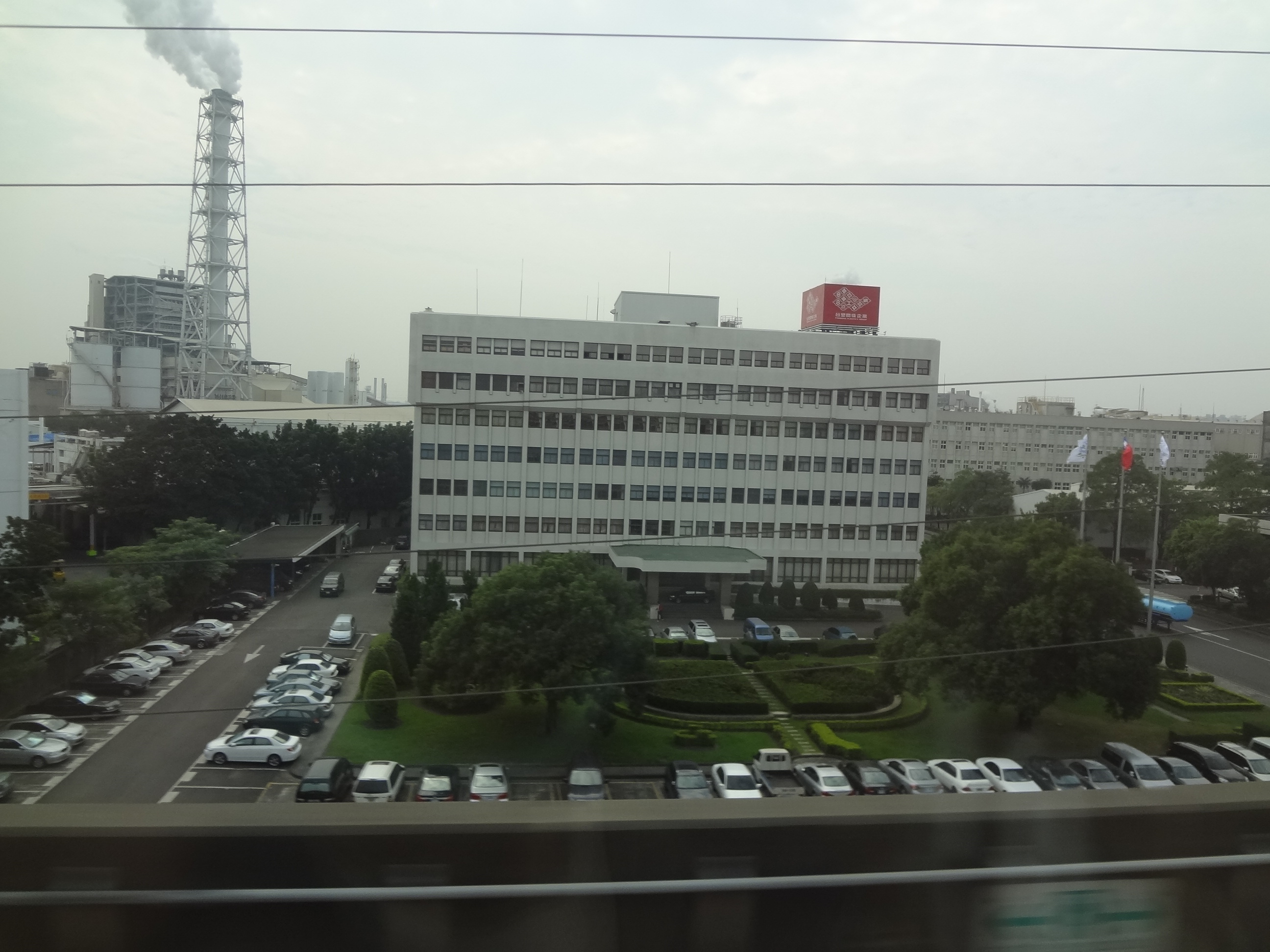
The plastics plant

The Renwu incident was a soil pollution event at the Formosa Plastics Corporation's Renwu Plant in Kaohsiung, Taiwan.

In 2009, the Taiwanese Environmental Protection Administration (EPA) found that the soil and the groundwater in the area close to Formosa Plastics' Renwu Plant has been polluted by benzene, chloroform, dichloromethane, 1,1,2-Trichloroethane, 1,1-dichloroethylene, tetrachloroethylene, trichloroethylene, and vinylchloride. The pollutants were all present at levels over 20 times the government standard; and most frighteningly, the levels of 1,2-dichloroethane were 30,000 times higher than the standard.

The Formosa Plastics' Renwu Plant had already discovered the soil pollution in 2006, and they had tried to reinforce the structure of their wastewater pit, but the reinforcement work was never completed.

Since the pollution was severe, the residents of the nearby area and an Elected Representative lodged protests, hoping that the Renwu plant could shut down. In April 2010, the EPA proposed a fine on Formosa Plastic' Renwu Plant to NT$150 million (US$4.7 million) for causing soil and groundwater pollution.
