= Linkou Chang Gung Memorial Hospital =

- Chang Gung Medical Foundation
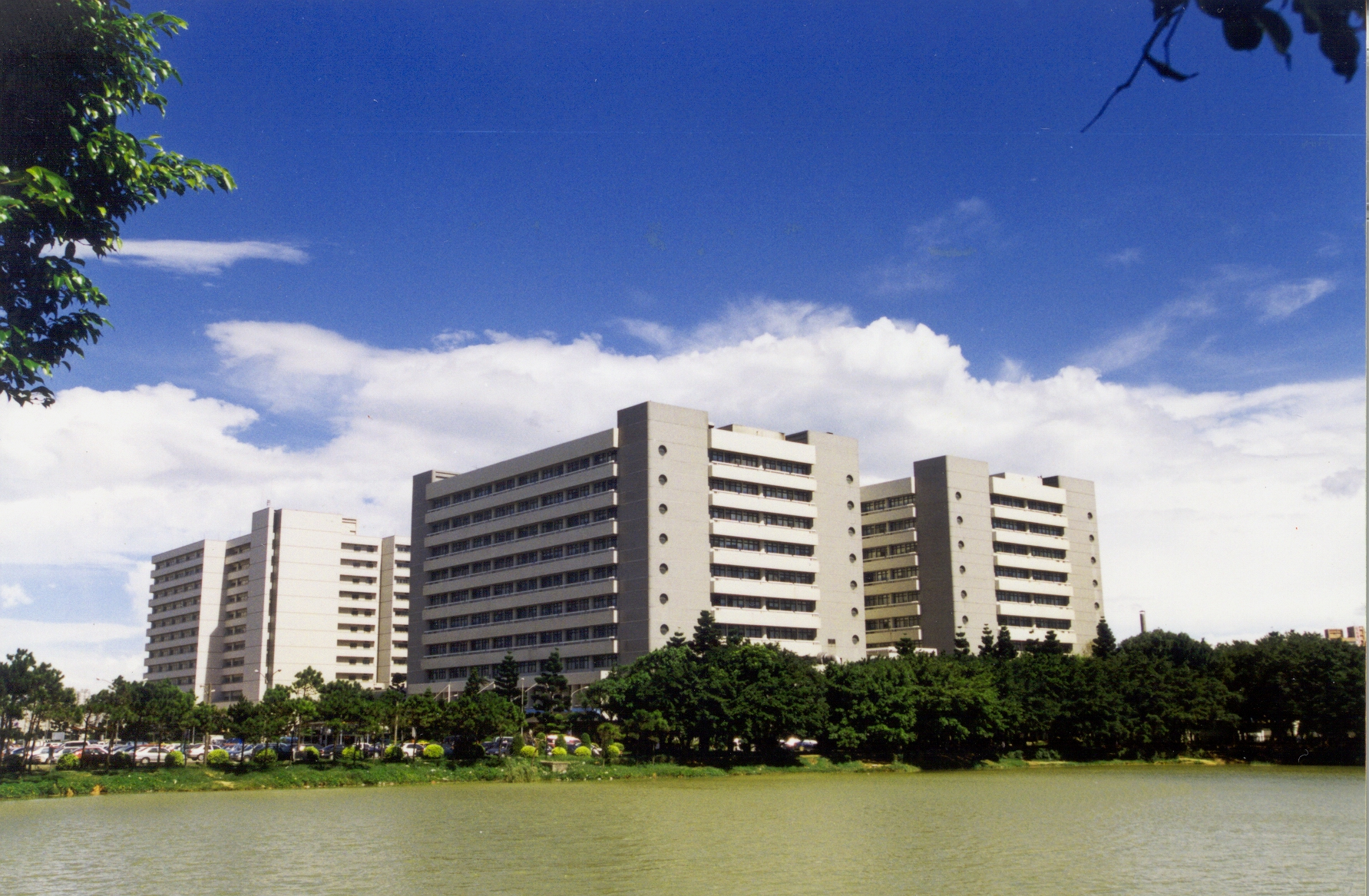

Geography
- Location: No. 5, Fuxing Street, Taoyuan City, Guishan District, Taiwan

Organisation
- Care system: Private
- Type: District General, Teaching
- Patron: Wang Yung-ching
- Network: Chang Gung Medical Foundation

Services
- Emergency department: Yes
- Beds: 3986

History
- Founded: 1978

Links
- Website: www.chang-gung.com/en/

The Linkou Chang Gung Memorial Hospital (CGMH; Chinese: 林口長庚紀念醫院; pinyin: Lín Kǒu Cháng Gēng Jì Niàn Yī Yuàn) also known as Chang Gung Memorial Hospital or "Chang Gung Hospital", is a large district general hospital located in Guishan District, Taoyuan City, Taiwan. It is part of the Chang Gung Medical Foundation hospital network. The Linkou Chang Gung Memorial Hospital offers nearly 4,000 beds and is among the largest hospitals in bed capacity.

== History ==
The hospital was founded in 1978 focusing on multiple medical specialties. Chang Gung receives an average of 8.2 million annual outpatient visits with 2.4 million inpatient treatment and has an average of 167,460 annual surgical patients. Chang Gung has completed over 1,000 successful liver transplants.

In 2015, the Proton and Radiation Therapy Center in Linkou Chang Gung Memorial Hospital was established. This was the first proton center in Taiwan.

Chang Gung is known for its "craniofacial reconstructive surgery for cleft lips and palates and jaw deformity" and has trained 828 physicians as of 2018. In 2014, Taiwan's Ministry of Health and Welfare recorded approximately 2,700 physicians from around the world have trained at hospitals in Taiwan.

Bolstered by its strong reconstructive capacity, Linkou Chang Gung Memorial Hospital is also the highest volume head and neck cancer treatment center in Taiwan and is one of the largest units in Asia.

Linkou Chang Gung Memorial Hospital have shown that during cardiac arrest there is "a 60% chance to restart the heart at the hospital" with prior CPR and a 32% chance if no CPR is administered prior. Immediate CPR may "double the chance of survival for children who experience out-of-hospital cardiac arrest".

== Transportation ==
The hospital has the Chang Gung Memorial Hospital metro station which assists in transport. The station is numbered A8 and is currently one of the five express stations on the line.

== See also ==
- Healthcare in Taiwan
- List of hospitals in Taiwan
