= Guishan District =

District in Taoyuan City, Taiwan

Coordinates: 24°59′42.02″N 121°20′17.14″E

Guishan 龜山區 Kameyama
- District
- Guishan District
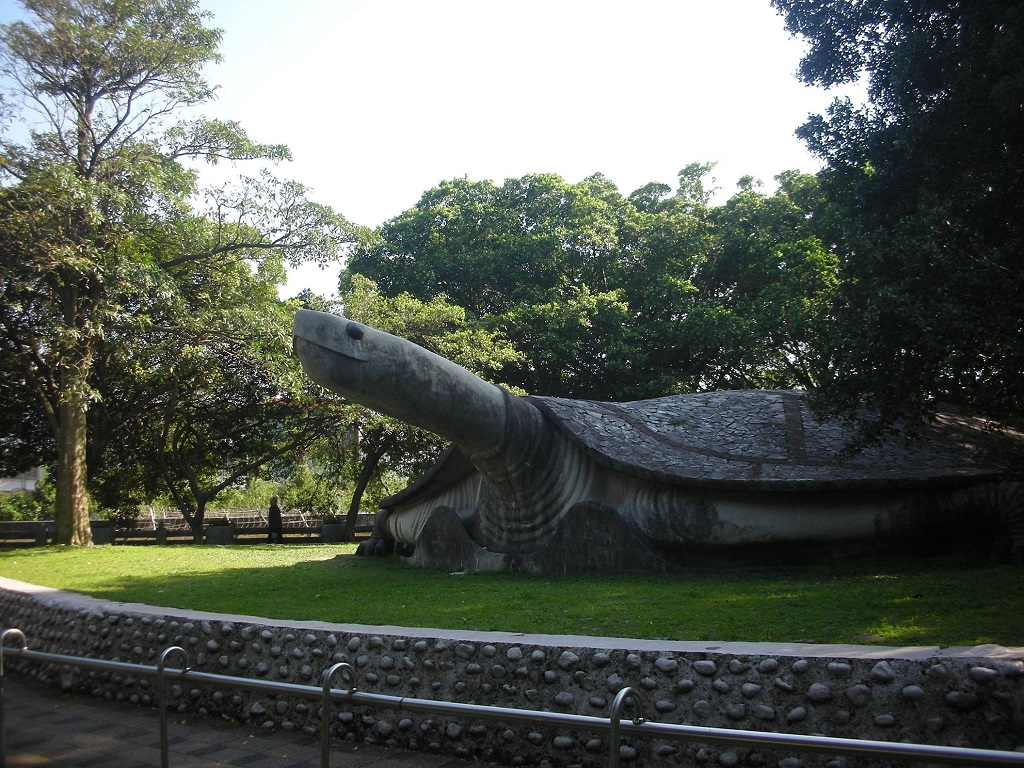
- Kueishan Zhongzhen Park

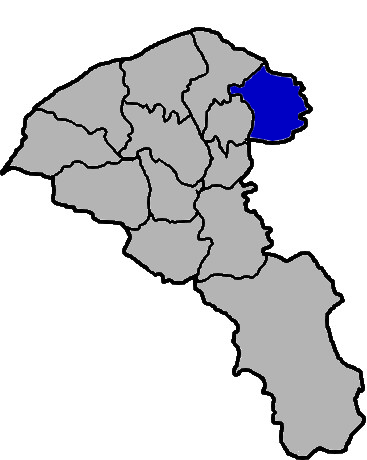
- Country: Taiwan
- Municipality: Taoyuan City

Government
  - Type: District

Population (March 2023)
  - Total: 174,258
- Website: www.guishan.tycg.gov.tw (in Chinese)

Guishan District (Chinese: 龜山區; pinyin: Guīshān Qū) is a district in northeastern Taoyuan City, Taiwan.

== History ==
Guishan was formerly known as Kulunsia (龜崙社 (Ku-lun-siā)). The name originated from a hill by the Mercy Buddha Temple of Shou Shan Rock, built in the 7th year of the Qianlong Period of the Qing Dynasty. The plains aborigines and Ketagalan tribes were located here.

From 1920 to 1945, Kameyama Village (龜山庄) was under Tōen District, Shinchiku Prefecture.

In 1950, it was renamed to Kueishan. On 25 December 2014, it was upgraded from Guishan Township to a district called Guishan District.

== Geography ==
- Area: 75.50km^{2}
- Population: 189,052 people (March 2026)

== Administrative divisions ==
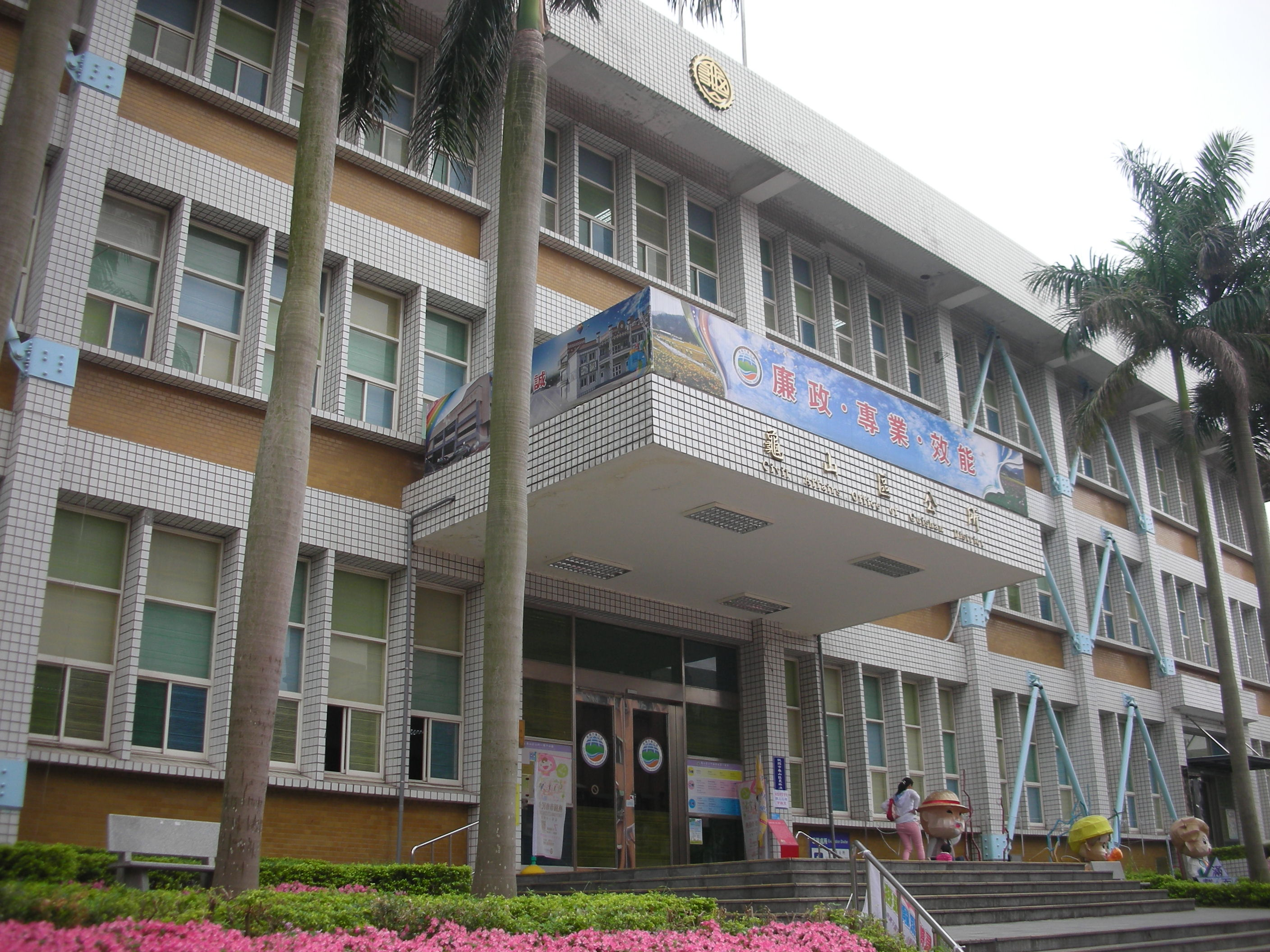
Kueishan District Office

Ching-chung, Liou-kuang, Chung-hsing, Hsin-hsing, Hsin-lu, Kuei-shan, Ta-tung, Shan-ting, Shan-teh, Shan-fu, Hsing-fu, Lung-shou, Lung-hwa, Huei-lung, Ling-ting, Hsin-ling, Tu-keng, Fu-yuan, Chiou-lu, Ta-keng, Fung-shu, Leh-shan, Chang-keng, Kung-hsi, Ta-kang, Ta-hu, Ta-hwa, Wuen-hua, Nan-shang and Nan-mei Village.

== Government and infrastructure ==
The Ministry of Justice operates the Taipei Prison in Guishan.

== Education ==
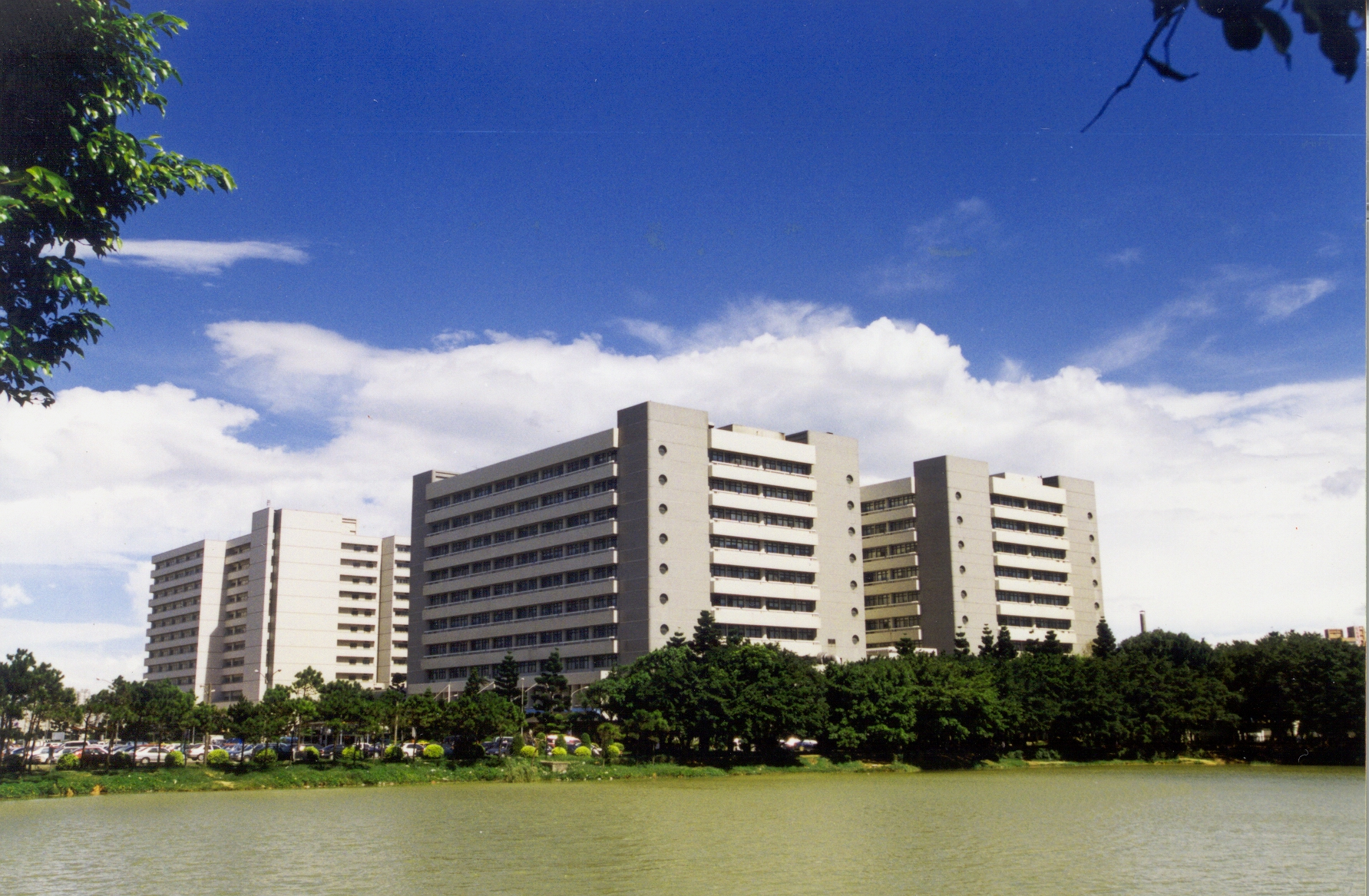
Linkou Chang Gung Memorial Hospital

- Chang Gung University
- Chang Gung University of Science and Technology
- Lunghwa University of Science and Technology
- Ming Chuan University
- National Taiwan Sport University

== Infrastructure ==
- Kuokuang Power Plant
- Taoyuan Refinery

== Tourist attractions ==
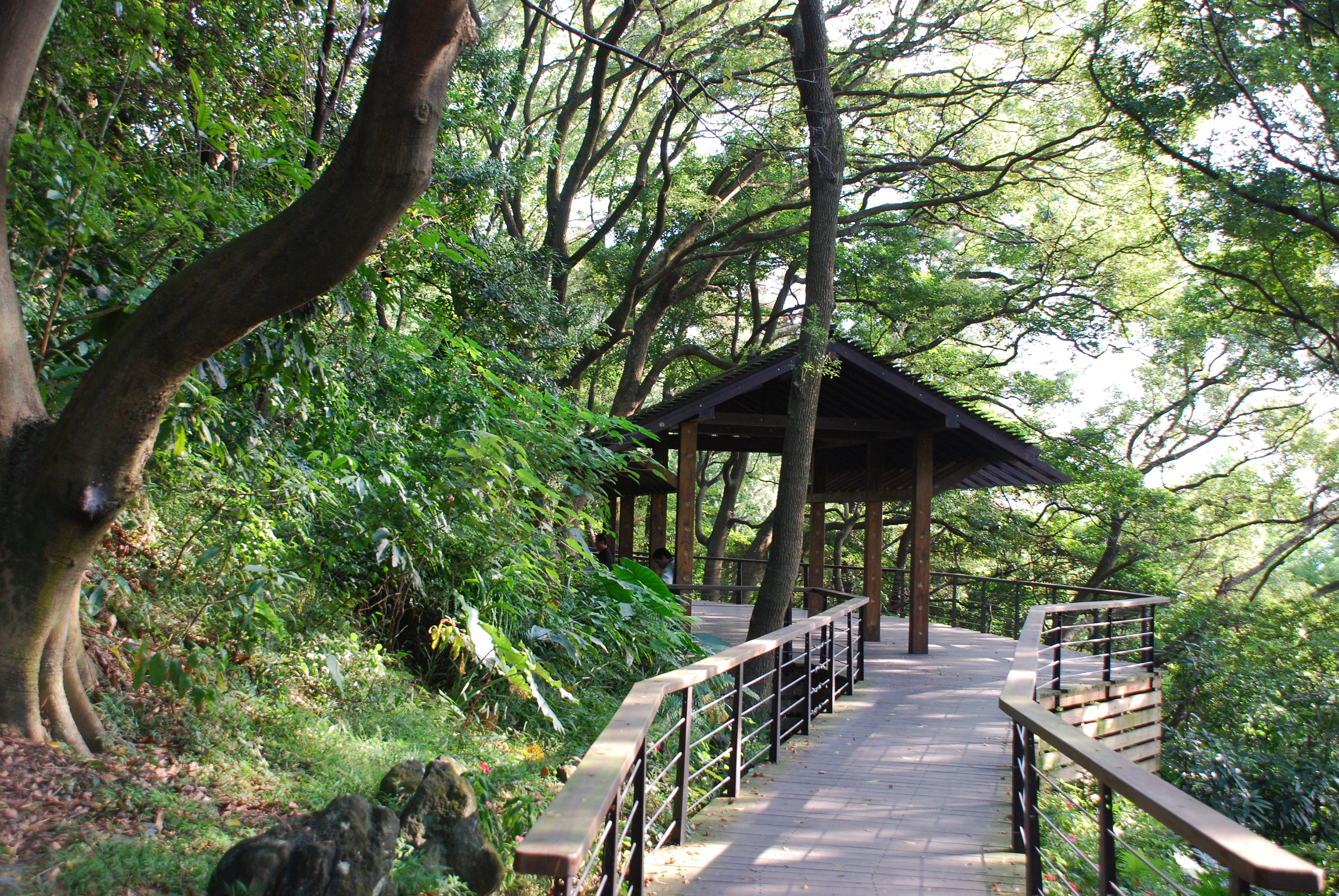
Hutou Mountain Park

- Dahu Memorial Park
- Formosa Plastics Group Museum
- Guishan Sports Park
- Hutou Mountain Park
- Taoyuan Sake Brewery
- World Police Museum

== Transportation ==
The Taiwan Railway section between Yingge and Taoyuan passes through Guishan District, but no station is currently planned.

=== Road ===
- National Highway No. 1
- Provincial Highway No. 1
- Provincial Highway No. 1A
- City Route No. 105

=== Taipei Metro ===
- Huilong Station

=== Taoyuan Airport MRT ===
- National Taiwan Sport University metro station
- Chang Gung Memorial Hospital metro station

== See also ==
- Taoyuan City
