= Wang Yung-ching =

Taiwanese businessman

- 王永慶
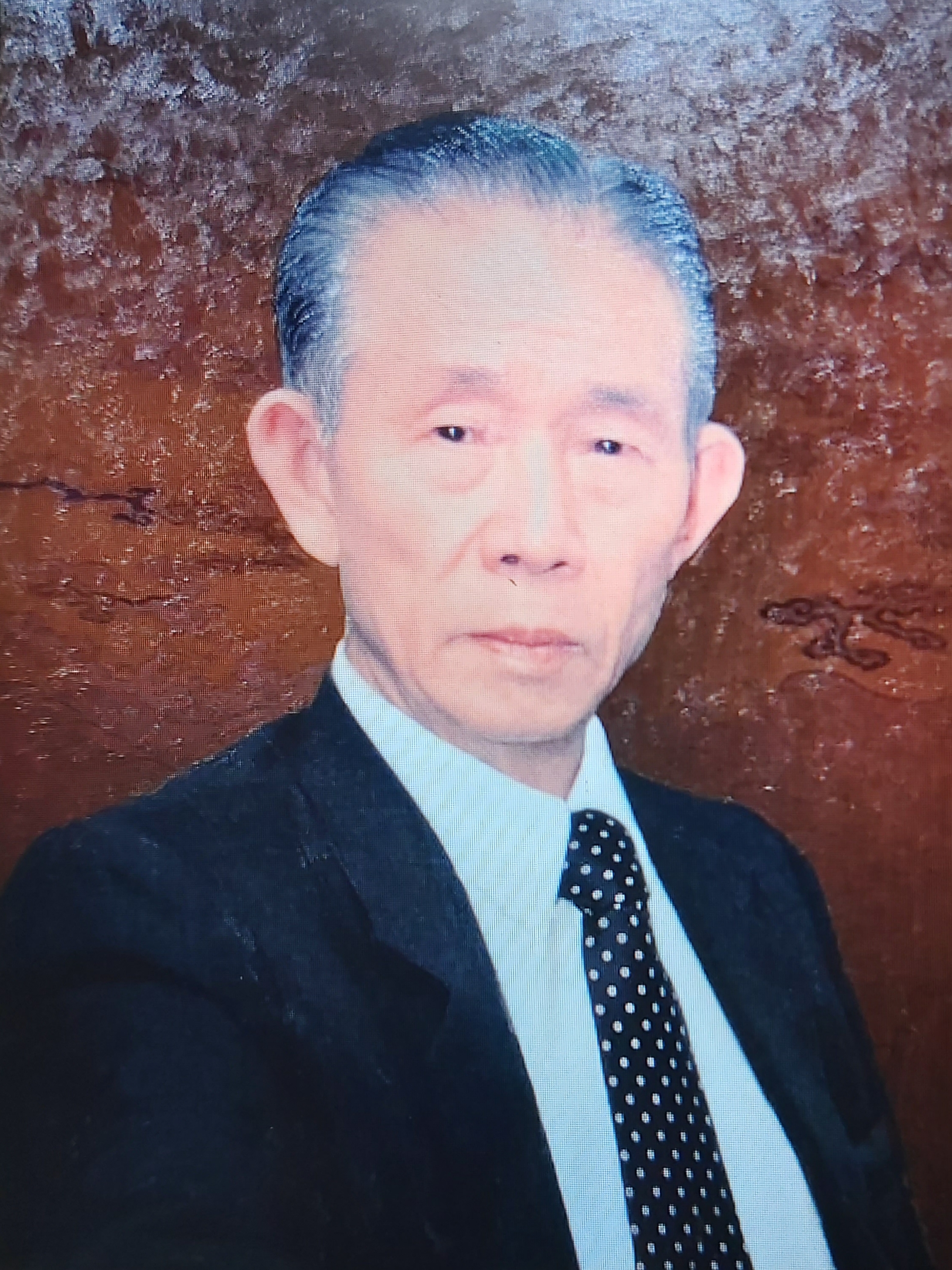
- Portrait of Wang Yung-ching, collection of Formosa Plastics Group Museum
- Born: 18 January 1917; Chyokutan jō, Shinden ku, Shinden shichō, Taihoku Chō, Japanese-occupied Taiwan
- Died: 15 October 2008 (aged 91); Short Hills, New Jersey, U.S.
- Citizenship: Japan (1917–1945); Taiwan (1945–2008)
- Occupation: Businessman
- Known for: Forbes 178th richest person (2008)
- Children: Winston Wong; Cher Wang; Walter Wang
- Relatives: Wang Yung-tsai (brother); Shirley Wang (daughter-in-law)

Wang Yung-ching (Chinese: 王永慶; pinyin: Wáng Yǒngqìng; Pe̍h-ōe-jī: Ông Éng-khèng; 18 January 1917 – 15 October 2008), also called Y.C. Wang, was a Taiwanese businessman. He was best known for being the chairman of Formosa Plastics Corporation, one of Taiwan's foremost plastic manufacturing establishments until his retirement in June 2006, where he stepped down at the age of 89. In 2008, Forbes ranked him as the 178th richest person in the world with an estimated net worth of US$5.5 billion.

Despite lacking any formal schooling beyond elementary school, he was ranked 2nd in the Forbes list of Taiwan's Richest in 2008.

== Early life and career ==
Wang was born in Chyokutan jō, Shinden ku, Shinden shichō, Taihoku Chō (modern-day Chitan Village, Xindian District, New Taipei City) in then-Japan-ruled-Taiwan.

In 1995, Wang signed a contract with Marco Terragni (chairman of Italproducts) to create Inteplast, the biggest company in the world for the production of Cartonplast.

Wang served as the chairman of the board of Formosa Plastics Corporation, one of the largest plastic manufacturers in the world, until June 2006, when he stepped down at the age of 89. He remained chairman of the boards of Nan Ya Plastics Corporation, Formosa Chemistry & Fibre Corporation, and Cyma Plywood & Lumber Co. Ltd, but indicated his intention to gradually resign from these positions to focus on his retirement. He was chairman of Ming-chi Institute of Technology, and Chang Gung Medical Foundation. After his death, Wang's position at Chang Gung was taken over by his younger brother Wang Yung-tsai, and then third wife Lee Pao-chu. He had been a vocal supporter of the Three Links between Taiwan and Mainland China.

Wang's first marriage was to Wang (née Guo) Yueh-lan, with whom he had no children. His second marriage to Yang Chiao produced Wang's first child, making a total of five. Wang later married a third time in 1935 to Lee Pao-chu. Wang and Lee had another five children; Wang fathered a total of ten. His eldest son from his second marriage with Yang Chiao, Winston Wang, founded Grace Semiconductor Manufacturing with Jiang Mianheng, the son of former Chinese Communist Party General Secretary Jiang Zemin in 2000. A daughter from his second marriage, Charlene Wang founded Taiwan-based First International Computer, Inc. Another daughter, Cher Wang, founded High Tech Computer (HTC) and VIA Technologies. Among the Wang siblings, Cher has come closest to rivaling her father's wealth. In 2011, Forbes estimated Cher Wang's personal fortune at $8.8 billion, making her the wealthiest individual in Taiwan at the time.

Wang died in his sleep on October 15, 2008 at his home in Short Hills, New Jersey. He was 91 years old.

The family struggles which followed his death led to the discovery that he had engaged in extensive tax evasion and had stashed billions of dollars offshore.

== See also ==
- Cartonplast
- List of billionaires
