= Wang Yung-tsai =

Taiwanese industrialist

- 王永在
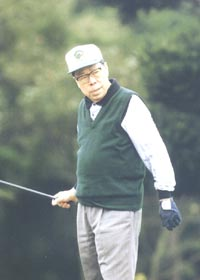
- Born: 24 January 1921; Taihoku, Taiwan, Empire of Japan
- Died: 27 November 2014 (aged 93)
- Relatives: Wang Yung-ching (brother)

Wang Yung-tsai (Chinese: 王永在; pinyin: Wáng Yǒngzài; Pe̍h-ōe-jī: Ông Éng-chāi; 24 January 1921 – 27 November 2014) was the younger brother of Wang Yung-ching, founder of Formosa Plastics Group.

== Life and career ==
He was born in Chyokutan, Shinden Town, Bunsan District, Taihoku Prefecture, Japanese Taiwan (modern-day Xindian District, New Taipei).

Wang began his business career by founding a lumber company in 1948, which he closed ten years later to help run Formosa Plastics.

In 1993, Wang was named director of Formosa Plastics' naphtha cracker, the sixth processing plant of its kind in Taiwan. In 2002, Wang Yung-ching went into retirement, leaving Wang Yung-tsai in control of Formosa Plastics. Both officially retired as chairmen in 2006, handing the conglomerate over to their children.

In 2010, Wang Yung-tsai was named #10 wealthiest person in Taiwan by Forbes. By 2014, Wang had dropped two spots to #12.

== Personal life ==
He was a fan of golf and would often wake up at 5 A.M to play. He died on 27 November 2014 at the age of 93. Wang's funeral was held on 14 December 2014.
