= Chang Gung University =

Private university in Taoyuan City, Taiwan

- 長庚大學
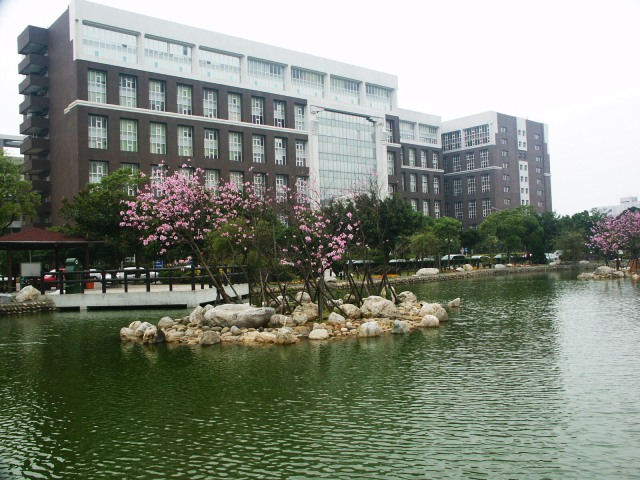
- Chang Gung University medical building
- Motto: 勤勞樸實(Pe̍h-ōe-jī: Khîn-ló͘ Phok-si̍t)
- Motto in English: Diligence, Perseverance, Frugality and Trustworthiness
- Type: Private
- Established: 1987 (as Chang Gung Medical College); 1997 (as CGU)
- President: Bao Jiaju (包家駒; Pe̍h-ōe-jī: Pau Ka-khu)
- Academic staff: 1,367 (2015)
- Students: 7,386 (2015)
- Location: Guishan, Taoyuan City
- Campus: Suburban, 92 acres
- Website: www.cgu.edu.tw

Chang Gung University
- Traditional Chinese: 長庚大學
Transcriptions
Standard Mandarin
- Hanyu Pinyin: Chánggēng Dàxué
Southern Min
- Hokkien POJ: Tióng-keng Tāi-ha̍k

Chang Gung University (CGU; Chinese: 長庚大學; Pe̍h-ōe-jī: Tióng-keng Tāi-ha̍k) is a private university in Guishan District, Taoyuan City, Taiwan.

== History ==
The institution was established as the Chang Gung Medical College in April 1987. Engineering and management students have been accepted since 1993, when the name was changed to Chang Gung College of Medicine and Technology. In July 1997, the name was changed again to Chang Gung University.

In February 2011 Chang Gung University and Arizona State University established an international Biosignatures Center aimed at the prevention, early detection, diagnosis, and treatment of cancer and other diseases. The center was to be directed by Arizona State University Nobel laureate Leland H. Hartwell.

The Formosa Plastics Group Museum is on campus.

== Colleges and departments ==
- College of Medicine
  - School of Medicine
    - Department of Microbiology and Immunology
    - Department of Anatomy
    - Department of Parasitology
    - Department of Biochemistry and Molecular Biology
    - Department of Physiology and Pharmacology
    - Department of Pathology
    - Department of Medical Humanities and Social Science
  - School of Nursing
  - Department of Medical Biotechnology and Laboratory Science
  - Department of Physical Therapy
  - Department of Occupational Therapy
  - School of Traditional Chinese Medicine
  - Department of Medical Imaging and Radiological Sciences
  - Department of Respiratory Therapy
  - Graduate Institute of Biomedical Sciences
  - Graduate Institute of Clinical Medicine Sciences
  - Graduate Institute of Early Intervention
  - Graduate Institute of Dental and Craniofacial Science
  - Graduate Institute of Natural Product
  - Graduate Institute of Traditional Chinese Medicine
  - Master's Degree Program in Molecular Medicine

- College of Management
  - Department of Information Management
  - Department of Health Care Management
  - Department of Industrial and Business Management
  - Department of Industrial Design
  - School of Business
  - Pre-MBA
  - Graduate Institute of Business and Management

- College of Engineering
  - Department and Graduate Institute of Electrical Engineering
  - Department and Graduate Institute of Mechanical Engineering
  - Department and Graduate Institute of Chemical and Materials Engineering
  - Department and Graduate Institute of Electronic Engineering
  - Department and Graduate Institute of Computer Science and Information Engineering
  - Graduate Institute of Electro-Optical Engineering
  - Graduate Institute of Medical Mechatronics Science
  - Graduate Institute of Biochemical and Biomedical Engineering
  - Ph.D. Program in Biomedical Engineering

== Academic rankings ==
University rankings

Global – Overall
- ARWU World: 601-700 (2023)
- QS World: =668 (2026)
- THE World: 1001-1200 (2023)

Regional – Overall
- QS Asia: =240 (2025)
- THE Asia: 251–300 (2023)

Chang Gung University was ranked 498th in the 2011 Performance Ranking of Scientific Papers for World Universities.

According to the 2011 Performance Ranking of Scientific Papers for World Universities announced by the Higher Education Evaluation and Accreditation Council of Taiwan, Chang Gung University achieved a fantastic result. Closely following National Taiwan University, National Cheng Kung University, National Jiao Tong University, National Tsing Hua University, and National Yang Ming University, it is the only private university among the six domestic universities which made it into the world's top 500.

In the specialized field of clinical medicine, Chang Gung University was ranked the world's 255th. In the science stream, CGU's electrical engineering research was ranked the world's 290th.

== Notable faculty ==
- Shin-Ru Shih

== See also ==
- List of universities in Taiwan
