= Mailiao Power Plant =

Power plant in Mailiao, Yunlin, Taiwan

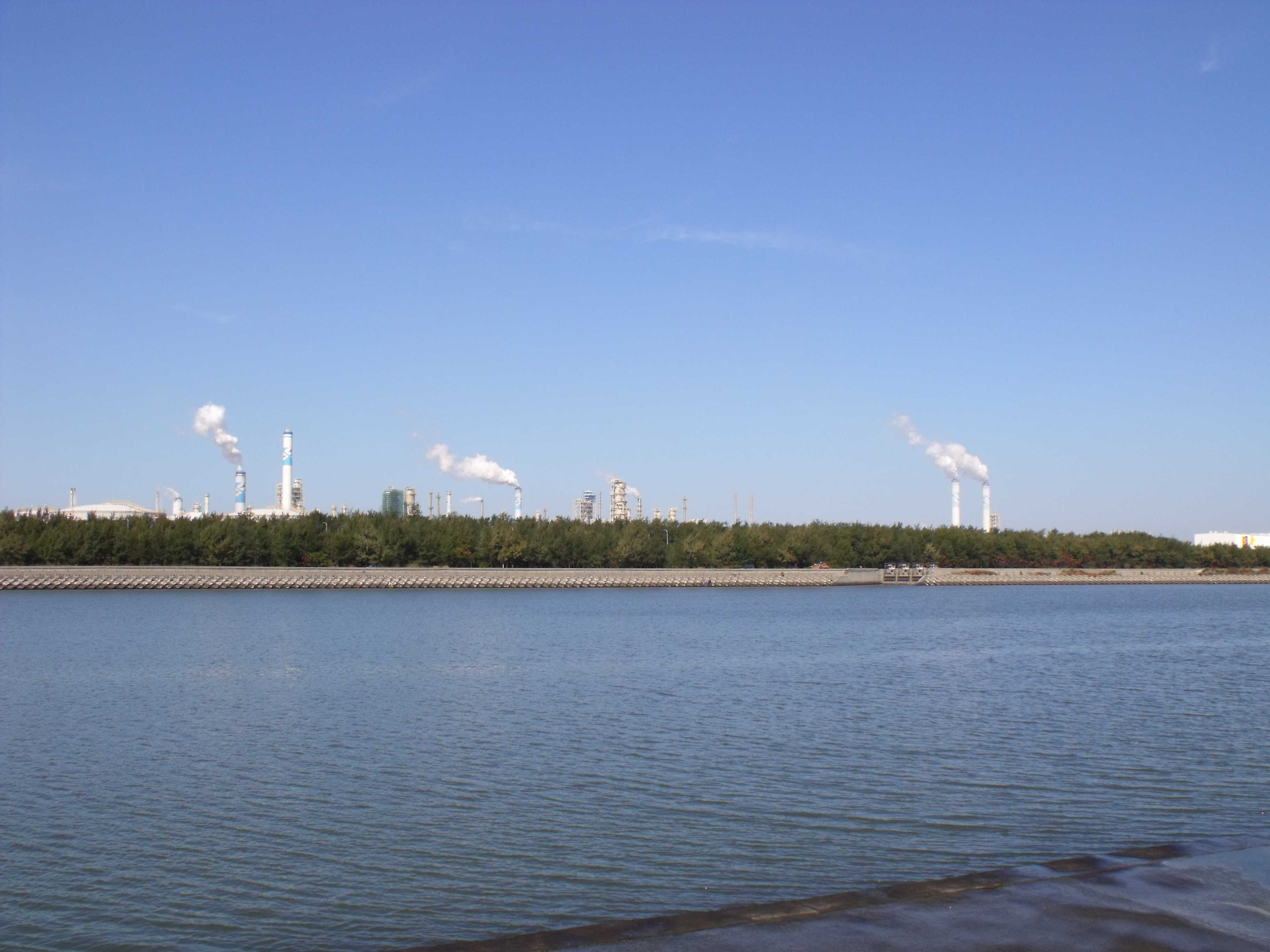
- Official name: 麥寮電廠
- Country: Republic of China
- Location: Mailiao, Yunlin, Taiwan
- Coordinates: 23°48′11.6″N 120°11′25.8″E
- Status: Operational
- Construction began: 12 December 1996
- Commission date: 1999 (Unit 1 & 2); 2000 (Unit 3 & A); 2001 (Unit 5 & B); 2002 (Unit 4)
- Construction cost: NT$40 billion (US$1.16 billion)
- Owners: Mai-Liao Power Corporation; Formosa Petrochemical Corporation

Thermal power station
- Primary fuel: Coal

Power generation
- Nameplate capacity: 7 X 600 MW

External links
- Commons: Related media on Commons

The Mailiao Power Plant (traditional Chinese: 麥寮電廠; simplified Chinese: 麦寮电厂; pinyin: Màiliáo Diànchǎng) is a coal-fired power plant in Formosa Mai-Liao Industrial Park, Mailiao Township, Yunlin County, Taiwan. With a total installed capacity of 4,200 MW, it is Taiwan's third largest coal-fired power plant, after Taichung Power Plant and Hsinta Power Plant.

== History ==
The groundbreaking ceremony for the power plant construction was held on 12 December 1996. Invited to the ceremony were Vice Premier Hsu Li-teh, Minister of Economic Affairs Wang Chih-kang and President of Legislative Yuan Liu Sung-pan.

Commissioned in June 1999 for its first two units, it is the first independent power producer power plant after Taipower ended the electricity supply monopoly in Taiwan in 1994.

== Architecture ==
The power plant is located on a 87 hectares of area made of reclaimed land.

Its smokestacks have a height of 250 metres.

== Ownership ==
The power plant is owned by the Mai-Liao Power Corporation (MPC) and Formosa Petrochemical Corporation (FPCC).

== Generation units ==
The power plant consists of five 600 MW pulverized coal-fired units owned by the MPC and two 600 MW pulverized coal-fired co-generation units owned by the FPCC. The plant is designed for base load service with the capability for daily startup and shutdown operation per instructions from Taipower's dispatcher center.

== Components ==
The coal handling system of the power plant has a truck unloading station capacity of 600 tonnes/hour and its flexible sidewall conveyor capacity of 800 tonnes/hour. It gets its coal directly from cargo ships docking at its Mai-Liao Industrial Port, next to the power plant. The coal is stored in coal domes in which each dome is 120 meter in diameter, 60 meter in height and 180,000 tons in capacity. The cooling system for the plant comes directly from the sea water with a total usage amount of 200,000 tons per day.

== Events ==
=== 2012 ===
On 20 June 2012 at 11:55 am, the power plant tripped during the Tropical Storm Talim. This caused the shut down of 54 out of 66 units of the Yunlin petrochemical complex.

=== 2016 ===
On 1 August 2016, a generating unit broke down, disrupting the supply of power.

=== 2017 ===
On 7 October 2017, the no. 1 generation unit was shut down due to pipe rupture, causing 600 MW of power loss.

== See also ==
- List of power stations in Taiwan
- List of coal power stations
- Electricity sector in Taiwan
