= Mai-Liao Power Corporation =

Independent power producer of Taiwan

- Trade name: Mai-Liao Power
- Native name: 麥寮汽電
- Romanized name: Màiliáo Qìdiàn
- Industry: electric power
- Founded: 12 April 1996
- Headquarters: Mailiao, Yunlin, Taiwan
- Total assets: NT$ 20 billion
- Website: Official website

The Mai-Liao Power Corporation (MPC; traditional Chinese: 麥寮汽電; simplified Chinese: 麦寮汽电; pinyin: Màiliáo Qìdiàn) is an independent power producer company in Taiwan. The total electricity installed capacity of the company is 1,800 MW and is produced using thermal power. The company is the subsidiary of Formosa Plastics Group.

== History ==
MPC was founded by Formosa Plastics Corp., Nan-Ta Plastics Corp., Formosa Chemical-Fiber Corp. and Formosa Petrochemical Corp. on 12 April 1996 with an initial capital of NT$ 4 billion.

== Power plants ==
- Mailiao Power Plant in Mailiao Township, Yunlin County

== See also ==
- Electricity sector in Taiwan
- List of power stations in Taiwan
- List of companies of Taiwan
