= Formosa Petrochemical =

Taiwanese petroleum refining and distribution company

- Native name: 台塑石化股份有限公司
- Romanized name: Tái sù shíhuà gǔfèn yǒuxiàn gōngsī
- Type: Public company
- Traded as: TWSE: 6505
- Industry: Petroleum industry
- Founded: 6 April 1992; 34 years ago
- Headquarters: No. 1-1, Taisu Industrial Park; Mailiao Township, Yunlin County, Taiwan
- Key people: Ming Tsao, President; Keh-Yen Lin, Executive Vice President
- Products: Crude oil refining Refined petroleum product sales Olefin production and sales
- Revenue: ▲NT$620.062 billion (2021)
- Net income: ▲NTN$49.364 billion (2021)
- Total assets: ▼NT$215.309 billion (2020)
- Total equity: ▼NT$312.627 billion (2020)
- Website: www.fpcc.com.tw

Formosa Petrochemical
- Simplified Chinese: 台塑石化股份有限公司
- Traditional Chinese: 台塑石化股份有限公司
Transcriptions
Standard Mandarin
- Hanyu Pinyin: Tái sù shíhuà gǔfèn yǒuxiàn gōngsī

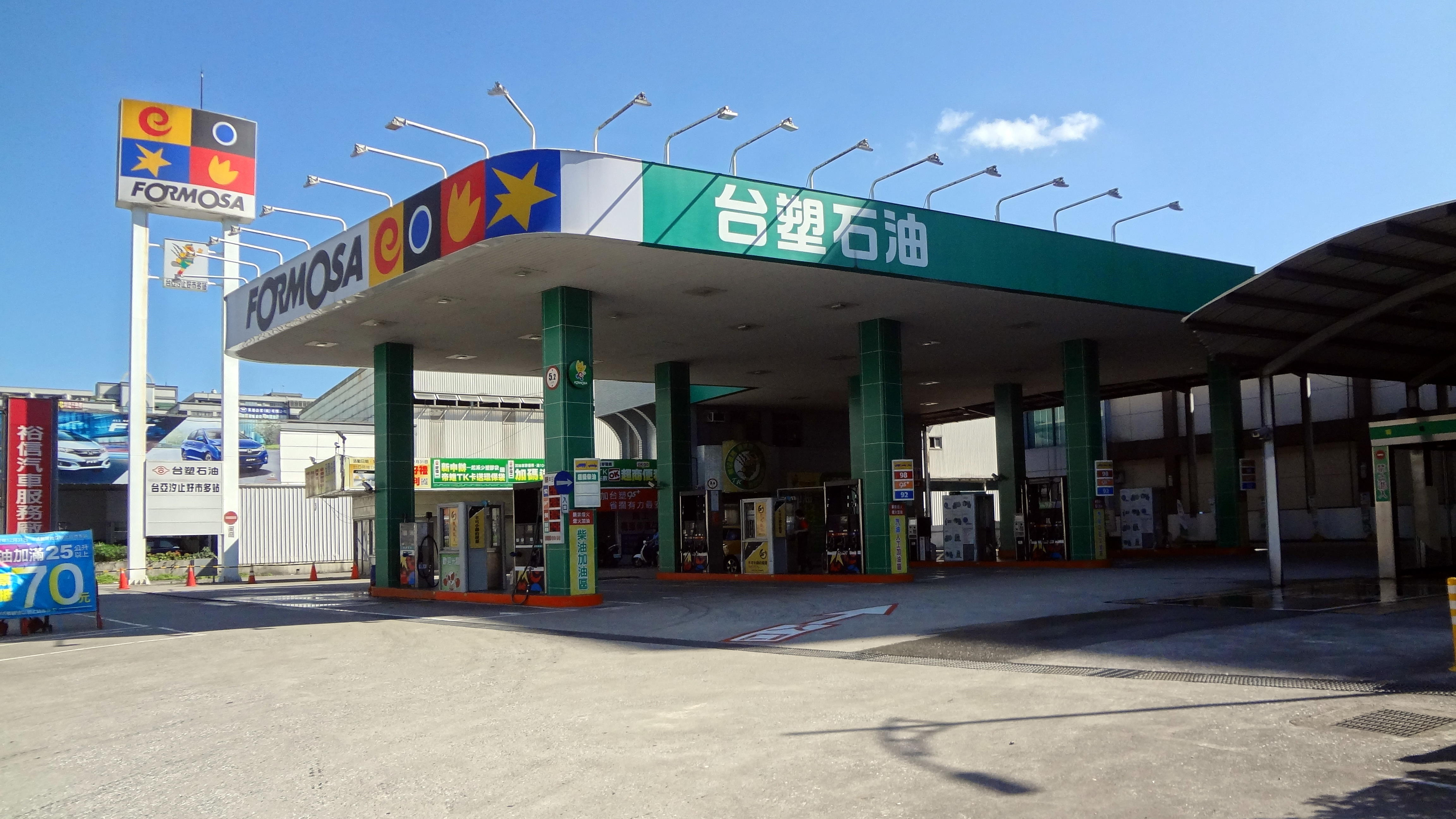
Formosa Oil Xizhi Costco Station in New Taipei City

Formosa Petrochemical Corporation (Chinese: 台塑石化股份有限公司; pinyin: Tái sù shíhuà gǔfèn yǒuxiàn gōngsī) is a Taiwanese energy company engaged in refining of crude oil, distribution of refined petroleum products, the production and sales of olefins, and the generation of electricity and steam. It was founded as a subsidiary of Formosa Plastics Group, and went public in 2003. It is headquartered in Mailiao Township, Yunlin County, in Taiwan.

== Corporate overview ==
Formosa Petrochemical was founded on April 6, 1992, as a wholly owned subsiaary of Formosa Plastics Group. The company went public in 2003, its shares listed on the Taiwan Stock Exchange.

The company has three primary businesses. The first is refining, marketing and sales of refined petroleum products like fuel oil, gasoline, aviation fuel, kerosene, naphtha, and similar products. The second is the refining, marketing and sales of olefins. The third is the generation of electricity and steam from cogeneration of its refining activities. Its major subsidiary is Formosa Oil, which owns a chain of gas stations.

As of 2021, Formosa Petrochemical was the second largest oil refiner in Taiwan, behind Chinese Petroleum Corporation. The company owns and operates the only privately owned refinery and naphtha cracking plant in Taiwan.

== Louisiana plant ==
Since 1981, Formosa Plastics Group has operated three plastics manufacturing plants in the U.S. state of Louisiana.

In 2015, Formosa Petrochemical began studying whether to build a $9.4 billion ethylene production plant on the west bank of the Mississippi River in St. James Parish, Louisiana. If built, the Sunshine Project plant would be one of the largest ethylene plants in the world, with 14 separate units covering 2,400 acres (970 ha), and the world's largest production facility for plastics and the raw materials to make plastics.

Formosa Petrochemical proposed a 10-year, two-phase construction process. An ethane cracker and associated facilities would be built on the downstream side of the site first. In the second phase, a plant would be built to convert ethane to ethylene and low- and high-density polyethylene. The Phase Two plant would be easily customizable to produce low- and high-density ethylene glycol, polypropylene, and other ethane derivatives. Other facilities to be constructed included docks, an electrical power generating plant, roads, a wastewater treatment plant, and water intake pipelines.

To help ensure that the project went forward, the state of Louisiana offered a $12 million grant to offset the cost of infrastructure upgrades, and provided both Quality Jobs and Industrial Tax exemptions. In addition, Louisiana Economic Development (a state workforce training agency) agreed to give Formosa Petrochemical access to its FastStart workplace skills development program. (Note: The Quality Jobs program offers a tax rebate of up to 6 percent of annual gross payroll for up to 10 years. It also offers a rebate on the state's sales/use tax, or a 1.5 percent facility expense rebate on total capital investment. The Industrial Tax program offers an 80 percent tax abatement for five years, and an option to renew for an additional five years.)

Formosa Petrochemical announced it would go ahead with the project in April 2018, and that it would generate 1,200 permanent jobs. The help mediate some of the problems construction would bring to the area, Formosa Petrochemical promised to build a local park, rebuild area roads, and provide financial support for a nearby elementary school.

The plant was opposed by state and national environmental and health activists, who said the plant would emit too many cancer-causing pollutants in a historically African American area already known as "Cancer Alley", contribute millions of tons of greenhouse gases, and worsen the world's plastic pollution problems. A study commissioned by the nonprofit investigative news agency ProPublica concluded the plant would double the amount of cancer-causing pollutants in the town of Convent and triple them in the village of St. James.

The state of Louisiana issued permits in January 2020 certifying that that project met state air pollution standards. The 15 different certificates approved the release of 1,600,000 pounds (730,000 kg) of toxic chemicals annually, doubling St. James Parish's overall toxic emissions.

Because the Sunshine Project plant would infringe on wetlands, federal law required the U.S. Army Corps of Engineers to assess the project's environmental impacts. The Corps initially approved construction, but environmental activists sued, arguing the agency had not considered all factors required by law. A federal district court agreed to hear the case, pausing the project. On November 4, 2020, the Corps pulled its permit for the Sunshine Project, saying it had found an error in its analysis. This made the lawsuit moot, and it was dismissed.

Environmental groups brought a second lawsuit in federal court, arguing that the Corps' analysis of impact on wetlands was inaccurate. That lawsuit was dismissed in January 2021.

In August 2021, the Corps of Engineers said it would conduct an entirely new environmental impact assessment.

The state permits were voided by Judge Trudy White of the 19th Judicial District of Louisiana in September 2022, who ruled the decision to issue the permits was "arbitrary and capricious". Judge White held that the state relied on "selective" and "inconsistent" data, failed to consider the cumulative impact of pollutants, and generally did not provide evidence to support its decision. In response to the ruling, Formosa Plastics said it still intended to build the plant.
