= Polyester (magazine) =

British fashion and lifestyle magazine

- Editor: Ione Gamble
- Categories: Magazine
- Frequency: Bimonthly
- Circulation: Global
- Founded: September 2014; 11 years ago
- Country: United Kingdom
- Based in: London
- Language: English
- Website: www.polyesterzine.com

Polyester is an independent print and online magazine based in London. It was launched in September 2014, mainly covering culture, fashion, lifestyle, and feminism with a particular focus on kitsch and camp aesthetics. Its tagline is "Have faith in your own bad taste," derived from a John Waters quote. Many other publications have noted that Polyester has a highly colourful, maximalist visual style.

== History ==
Polyester was launched in September 2014 by Ione Gamble, also the founding editor-in-chief. Gamble self-published the magazine using student loans. Its slogan is "Have faith in your own bad taste", derived from a John Waters quote. In an interview with Creative Review's Aimée McLaughlin, Gamble explained the slogan: "I was really sick of how taste was discussed in our society. All the things I adored seemed to come from 'low taste' culture, or were considered unintellectual because they were brash or loud." With Polyester, Gamble sought out to create the "antithesis" to the typical minimalist women's magazine.

In February 2019, Polyester launched a podcast. It is hosted by Gamble and the magazine's senior editor Gina Tonic. According to Hypebae's Nav Gill, the magazine's podcast covers a range of topics including "everything from chronic illness and witchcraft to how to build a fashion business". In an article published on 12 December 2024, The Independent included the Polyester podcast in their list of favourite podcasts, with writer Yolanthe Fawehinmi praising it for its cultural commentary that "will make you both laugh and think".

== Style and reception ==
Charlotte Gush of i-D described Polyester as a "post-Internet feminist manifesto" and "girl zine of trash, kitsch and camp". Anna Cafolla of Dazed called the magazine's print pages as "confectionary [sic] coloured" and "femininely maximalist". The New York Times' Marisa Meltzer said that Polyester's visual style is reminiscent of magazines from the 1990s. Felicity Martin of The Face observed that the pages of the print edition are colourful and filled with illustrations, while the website at the time had custom cursors and pixellated glitter, evoking the 1990s.
