= Silbergeld =

Silbergeld is a surname. Notable people with the surname include:

- Ellen Silbergeld (born 1945), environmental health expert and MacArthur Fellow
- Jerome Silbergeld (born 1944), scholar of Chinese art
