= Gufram =

Italian furniture company

- Company type: Privately held company
- Industry: Designer furniture
- Founded: 1966
- Founder: Fratelli Gugliermetto
- Headquarters: Via XXV Aprile 22, 12060, Barolo, (Cuneo), Italy
- Parent: Italian Radical Design Group
- Website: gufram.it/en/

Gufram is an Italian furniture manufacturer known for avant-garde, conceptual, witty, and Pop-art influenced designs; the unconventional use of industrial materials; collaborations with well known architects and designers; and the contribution its products made to the aesthetics of the 1960s Radical period of Italian design.

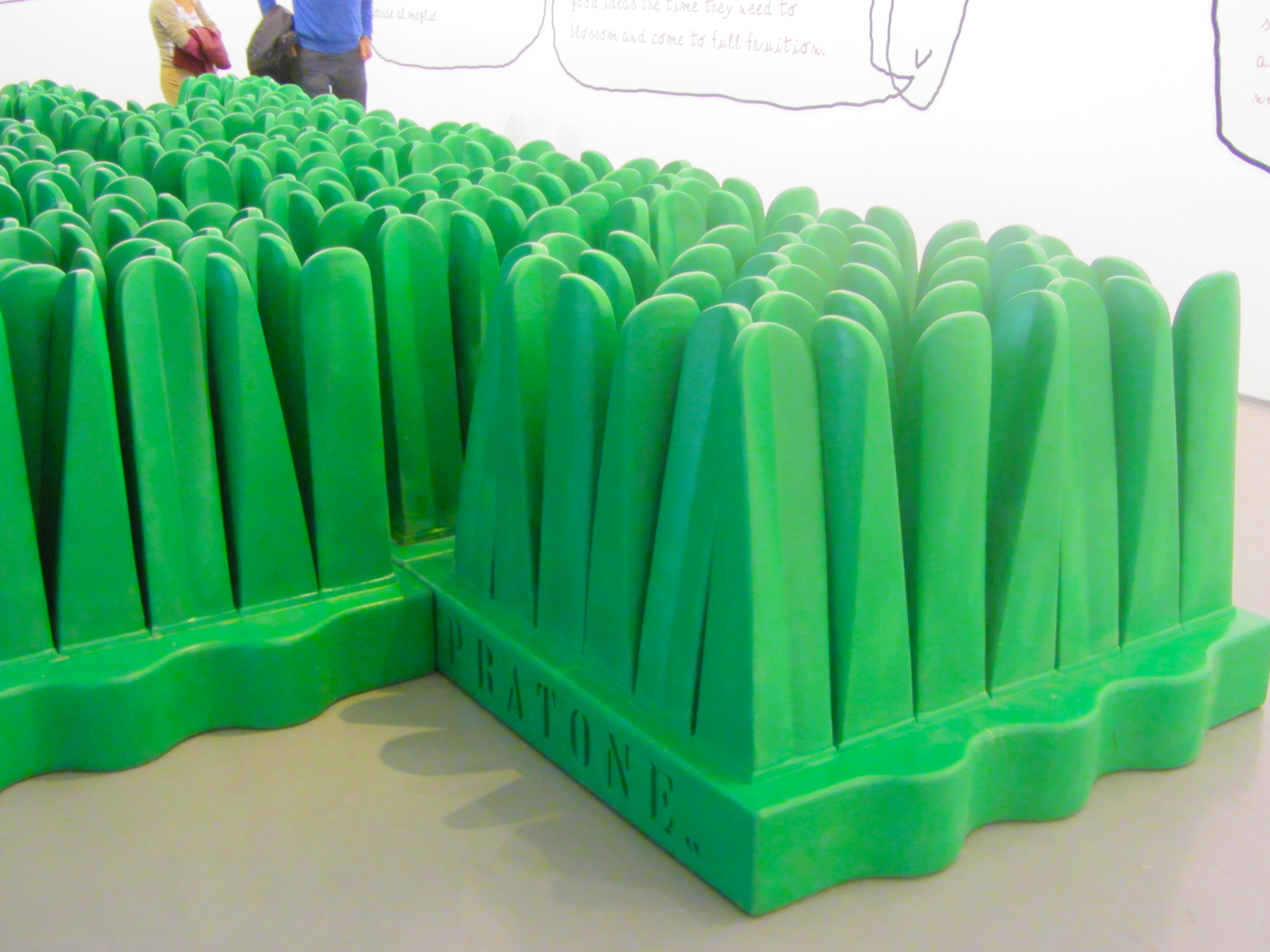
Pratone seats in an exhibition at the Triennale Design Museum, Milan (2011)

== History ==
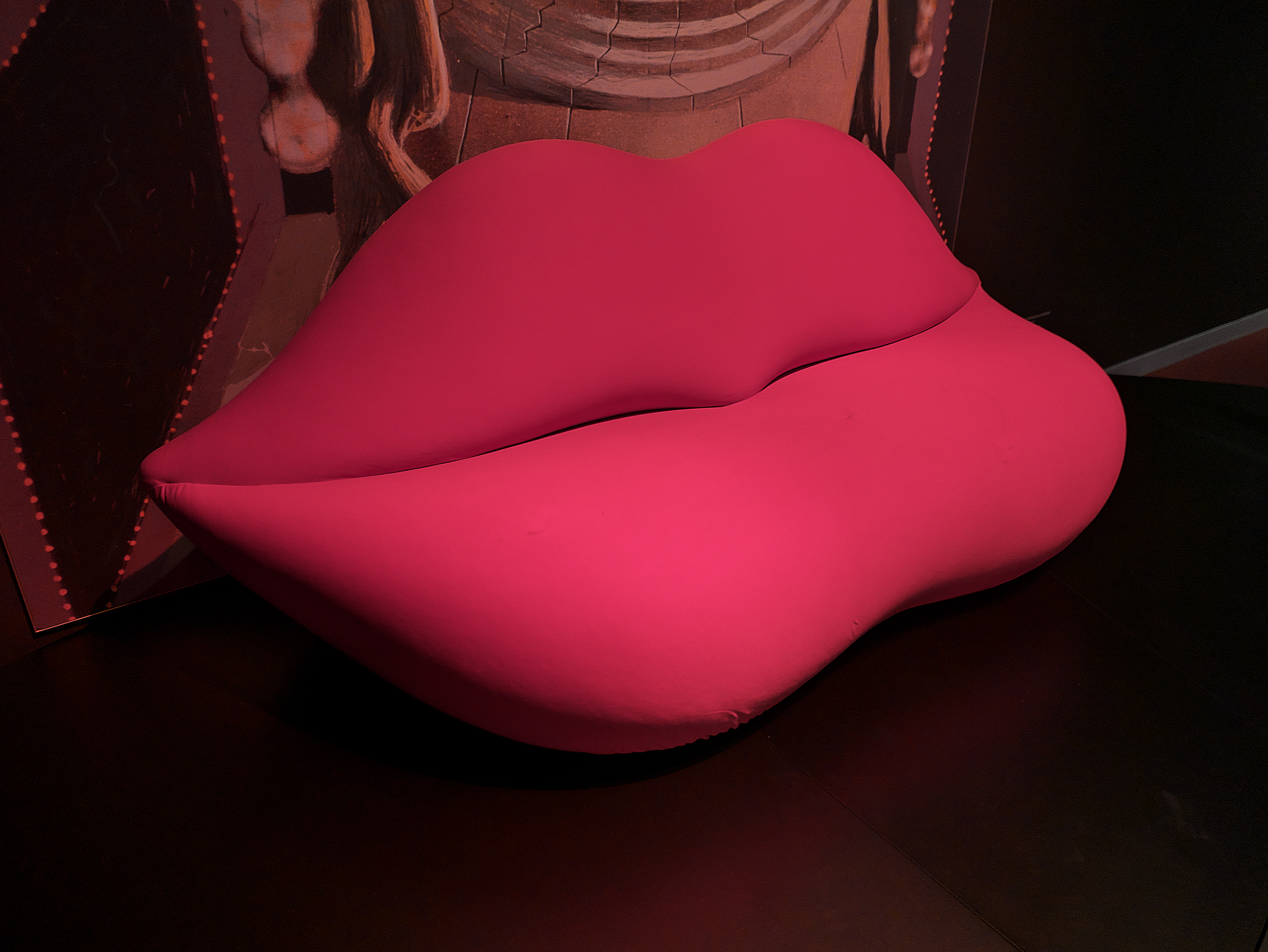
Bocca sofa designed by Studio 65

Gufram was founded in 1966 by furniture manufacturer Gugliermetto Fratelli Mobile (Grosso, Turin) as a brand and creative lab for the company to experiment with modern furniture production. (Note: The Vitra Design museum site states that "the company changed its name to Gufram in 1966". [Nb: Gufram is a portmanteau composed of the first letters of each word in the company's previous name: Gugliermetto Fratelli Mobile.])

Influenced by the early 1960s' avant-garde artistic culture in Turin and the radical architectural experimentation of the period, the Gugliermetto brothers began to explore new forms and new materials to use in the production of design projects. Adapting materials such as polyurethane foam, which was widely used as a packing insulant in the transportation industry, allowed Gufram to manufacture entirely new and radical furniture typologies.

At the initiative of creative director Giuseppe Raimondi, who joined the company in 1966, (Note: Some references state that Raimondi joined Gufram (or its precursor) in 1965. Better source(s) needed.) Gufram began collaborations with emerging artists of the time such as Ugo Nespolo and Piero Gilardi of the Arte Povera movement; architects Studio 65, Guido Drocco and Franco Mello, Giorgio Ceretti, Pietro Derossi and Riccardo Rosso (Gruppo Strum); and the mathematician and theoretical physicist Tullio Regge, who "transformed a mathematical quartic function into a volume with intentionally ergonomic characteristics" for the design of his Detecma seat.

In 1968 Gufram presented its new products at the XIV Triennale in Milan under the name of Multipli 'multiples', (Note: Industrially reproduced art objects in limited edition.) which were well received by the public and press. This critical success encouraged the company to further explore their philosophy and production methods. International recognition came in 1972 with an exhibition dedicated to Italian design entitled Italy: The New Domestic landscape, curated by Emilio Ambasz and staged at the Museum of Modern Art (MOMA) in New York, where they were first exposed, and subsequently acquired for the museum's permanent collection. From that moment on, Gufram products officially made it into the history of design and were introduced to the collections of recognized European and American museums such as the Metropolitan Museum of Art of New York, the Vitra Design Museum, the Triennale of Milan, the Centre Pompidou in Paris and the Denver Art Museum.

Gufram began manufacturing furniture for public spaces in 1978. The original Turin based company was acquired by the Poltrona Frau Group in 2004 and subsequently moved its headquarters to Tolentino. In 2012 the company was purchased by Sandra Vazza and her son Charley and has been based in Barolo, Piedmont since. (Through a company called Italian Radical Design Group, the same family also owns Memphis and Meritalia.) Gufram still produces furniture designed in the 1960s and 1970s in limited and special editions, as well as more recent pieces by artists and designers such as Marion Baruch, Valerio Berruti, Keith Haring, Snarkitecture, Studio Job, Ross Lovegrove, Michael Young, MSCHF, and Alessandro Mendini.

== Products ==
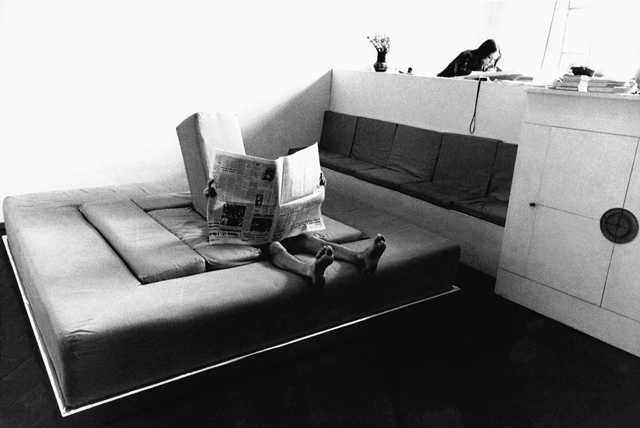
Rumble designed by Gianni Pettena (1967)

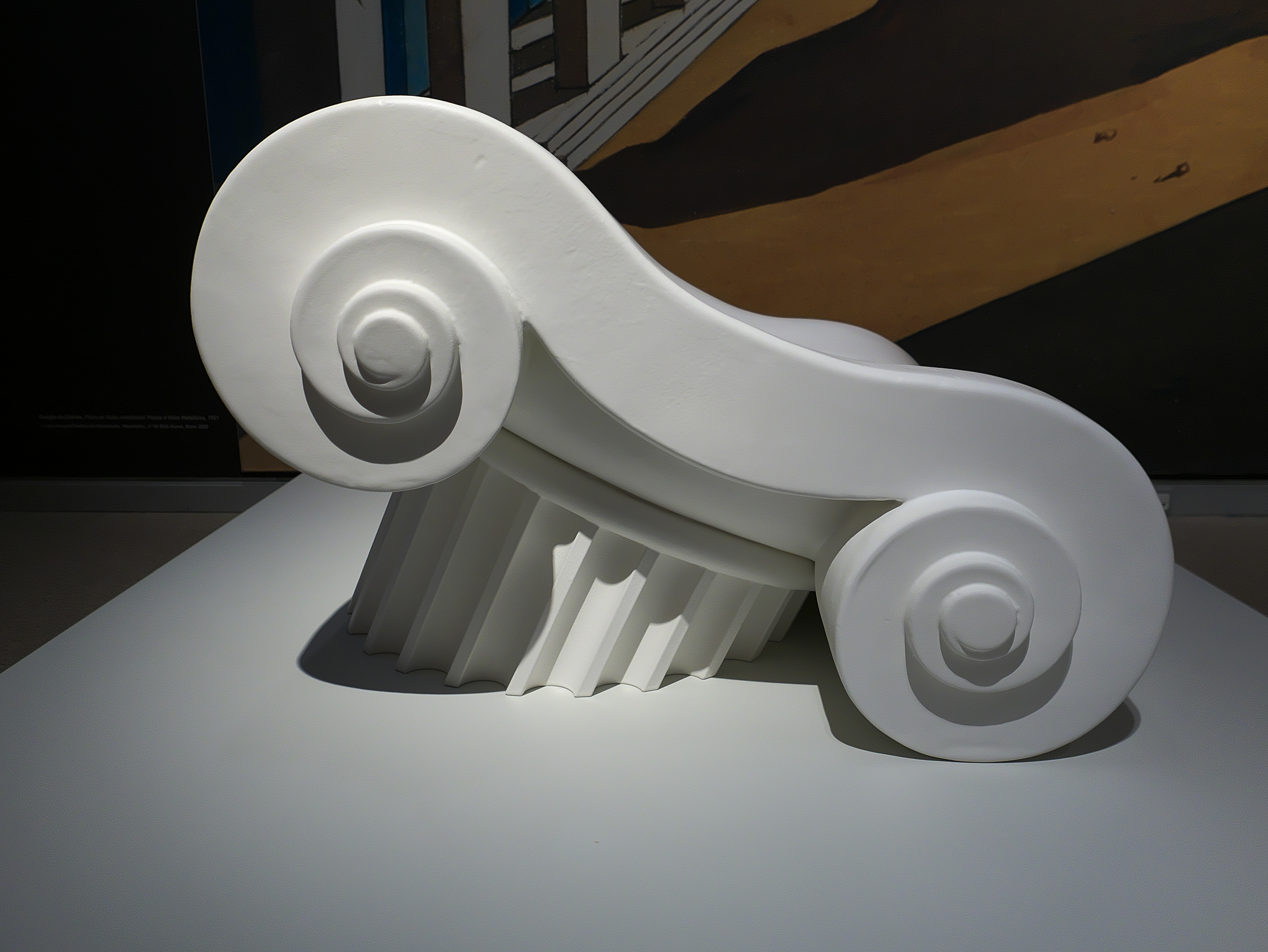
Capitello designed by Studio65 (1972)

The Gufram catalogue consists of a number of designs, some of which are limited edition pieces (Multipli). The main products are:

- Alvar (1966), chaise-longue by Giuseppe Raimondi
- Attica (1972), by Studio 65 (collection of the Metropolitan Museum of Art of New York) (in production)
- BiancoCactus (2007), coat stand by Guido Drocco and Franco Mello (in production)
- Bocca (1970), sofa by Studio 65 inspired by the portrait of Mae West painted by Salvador Dalí (in production)
- Cactus (1972), coat stand by Guido Drocco and Franco Mello (collection of the Smithsonian Cooper-Hewitt, National Design Museum in New York)
- Capitello (1972), by Studio 65 (collection of the Metropolitan Museum of Art of New York) (in production)
- Dejeuner Sur L'Arbre (2004), table by Gianni Arnaudo (in production)
- Dark Lady and Pink Lady (2008), sofa by Studio 65 (in production)
- Detecma (1968), armchair by Tullio Regge (collection of Triennale Design Museum in Milan)
- Massolo (1974), table by Piero Gilardi (in production)
- Margherita (1967), table and chair by Giuseppe Raimondi and Ugo Nespolo
- Metacactus (2012), coat stand by Guido Drocco and Franco Mello (in production)
- Pavèpiuma (1967), carpet by Piero Gilardi
- Pratone (1971), seat by Giorgio Ceretti, Pietro Derossi and Riccardo Rosso (part of the 100 Masterpiece of Design in the Collection of Vitra Design Museum) (in production)
- Puffo (1970), seat by Giorgio Ceretti, Pietro Derossi and Riccardo Rosso (in production)
- Punch a Wall (2017), punching bag by Studio Job (originally a limited edition, subsequently in production since 2024)
- RossoCactus and NeroCactus (2010), coat stand Guido Drocco and Franco Mello (in production)
- Roxanne (2017), armchair by Michael Young (in production)
- Rumble (1967), divan by Gianni Pettena (later produced by Poltronova)
- Sassi (1968), seating system by Piero Gilardi (collection of the Metropolitan Museum of Art and the Museum of Modern Art in New York)
- Siedi-tee (2004), seat by Laura Fubini, Francesco Mansueto, Marco Verrando (in production)
- Torneraj (1968), armchair by Giorgio Ceretti, Pietro Derossi and Riccardo Rosso (collection of the Museum of Modern Art in New York)

== See also ==
- List of companies of Italy
