= Cloudy Mountains =

Paintings by Mi Youren

- Yúnshān tú, 雲山圖 (Chinese)
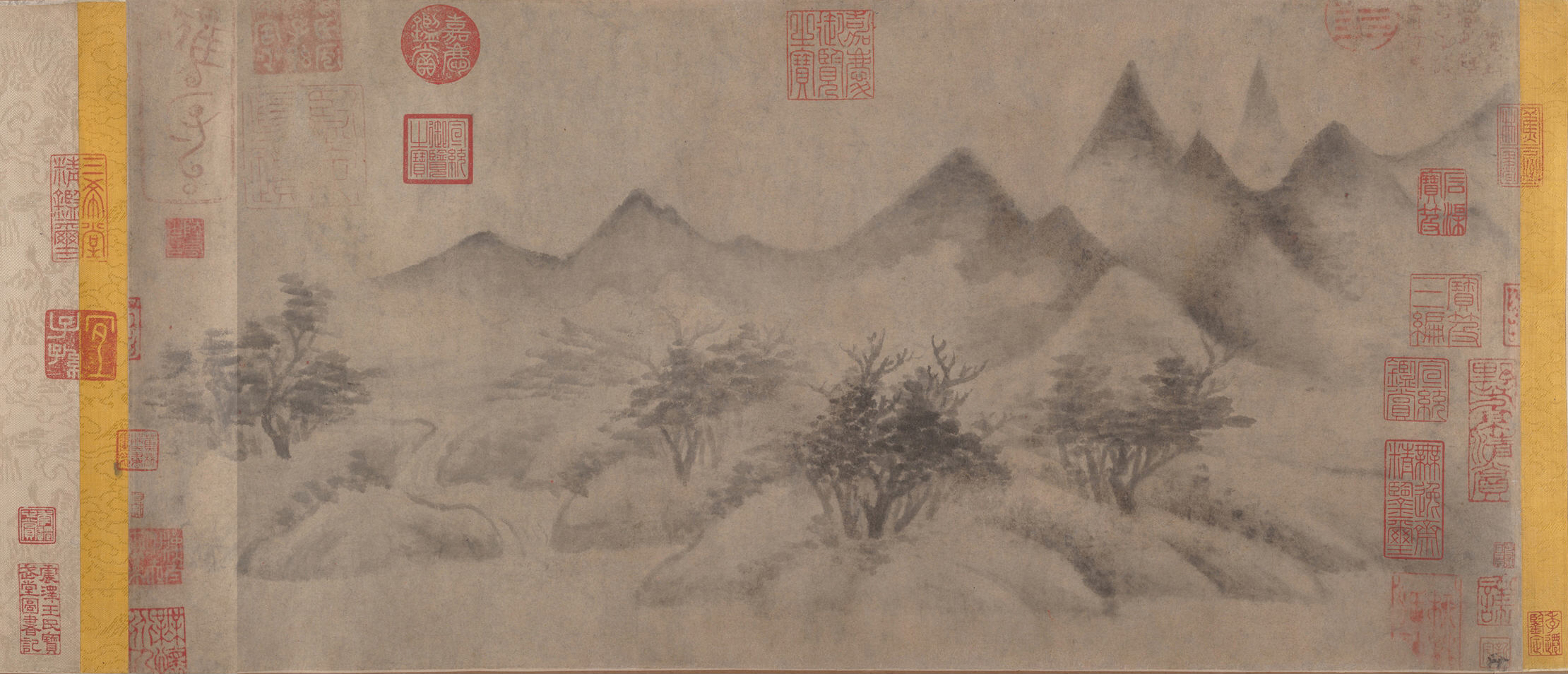
- Artist: Mi Youren
- Year: 1140s
- Dimensions: 28.4 cm × 747.2 cm (11.2 in × 294.2 in)
- Location: Metropolitan Museum of Art, New York City
- Accession: 1973.121.1

Cloudy Mountains
- Yúnshān tú, 雲山圖 (Chinese)
- Artist: Mi Youren
- Year: 1130
- Dimensions: 45.5 cm × 646.8 cm (17.9 in × 254.6 in)
- Location: Cleveland Museum of Art, Cleveland, Ohio
- Accession: 1933.220

Cloudy Mountains (Chinese: 雲山圖) are a set of two paintings of the same name created by Chinese Song dynasty artist Mi Youren (1072–1151), son of painter Mi Fu.

Utilizing a technique called "ink play" or "Mi dots" (Mi Dian), Mi Youren adapted the style of his father, which involved blots of wet ink blots, moist brushes, and horizontal strokes to lay out a blurry, yet simplified mountain landscape, which represented the rainy climate of Henan Province.

The subsequent techniques of Chinese landscape paintings, would have substantial influence in the Ming dynasty, as well as Muromachi period art in Japan, including artists like Sesshū.

One painting is currently held by the Metropolitan Museum of Art, and the other is held by the Cleveland Museum of Art, the latter being Cleveland's oldest dated Chinese painting.

== Background ==
Mi Youren, whose grandmother was the wet nurse of Song dynasty emperor Yingzong, was involved in the imperial administrations like his father Mi Fu, who took on the position of military governor in Wuwei as well as secretary for the Ministry of Rites. He is likely either of Xianbei descent, through the Kumo Xi tribe and/or of Sogdian descent, as the surname Mi (米) is considered a Sogdian surname.

In addition to being a scholar and an artist, Mi Youren authenticated ancient paintings under Emperor Huizong, and also served as a vice president for the Ministry of War. He also has combat experience in the Jin–Song Wars.

== The Metropolitan Museum Painting ==
The MET specimen (1973.121.1) is representative of the divergence between the simplified Southern Song style that Mi Fu innovated versus Northern Song styles, which placed emphasis on detailed landscape. Painted in the 1140s, while under the service of Emperor Gaozong, the "cloudy mountain" motif became his artistic interpretation of what good governance is.

Subsequent colophons annotating the painting, one piece written by Wang Jie (王介) in 1200 would describe how Mi Youren would produce the paintings for Gaozong, who would then gift it to his courtiers.

=== Provenance ===
The MET painting enjoyed extensive provenance history, as though the image itself only occupied 57 centimetres (22 in) in length, subsequent mountings and annotations extended the scroll to 747.2 centimetres (24.51 ft) in length. The painting was passed through the Qing dynasty emperors up until the end of the dynasty.

- Wang Jie, 王介 dated 1200
- Lu You, 陸友 (1280–1340)
- Xianyu Shu, 鮮于樞 (1257–1302), annotation dated 1290
- Guo Tianxi, 郭天錫 (1227–1392)
- Fang Mian, 方勉 (15th century), annotation dated 1437
- Song Zheng, 宋拯 (15th century), annotation dated 1438
- Liang Qingbiao, 梁清標 (1620–1691)
- Emperor Qianlong (reign 1736–1795)
- Emperor Jiaqing (reign 1796–1820)
- Emperor Xuantong, Puyi (reign 1909–1911)
- Xu Bangda, 徐邦達 (1911‒2012)
- Wang Jiqian 王季遷 (C. C. Wang, 1907‒2003)
- Purchased by the MET through the family of C.C. Wang in 1973

== The Cleveland Museum of Art Painting ==
The Cleveland Painting is one of the Cleveland Museum of Art's oldest dated Chinese painting, acquired in 1933. It depicts the misty riverscape of the Yangtze Delta. As a result of the turmoil during the Jin-Song war, Mi Youren fled the scene where upon the encounter of the landscape, he painted this piece on September 11, 1130. Written on the landscape was:

好山無數接天涯，烟靄陰晴日夕佳。 要識先生會到此，故留筆戲在君家。 庚戍歲，辟地新昌作。元暉。 [seal] 元暉戲作 Fine hills are endless toward the edges of heaven. So are mist and cloud, rain and shine, days and nights. Had I known that you’d be visiting here. I would have left this playful work in your home. In the year of gengxu [1130], [I painted this] while seeking refuge in Xinchang. Yuanhui. [seal] “Yuan hui xi zuo” (Yuanhui playfully made this).

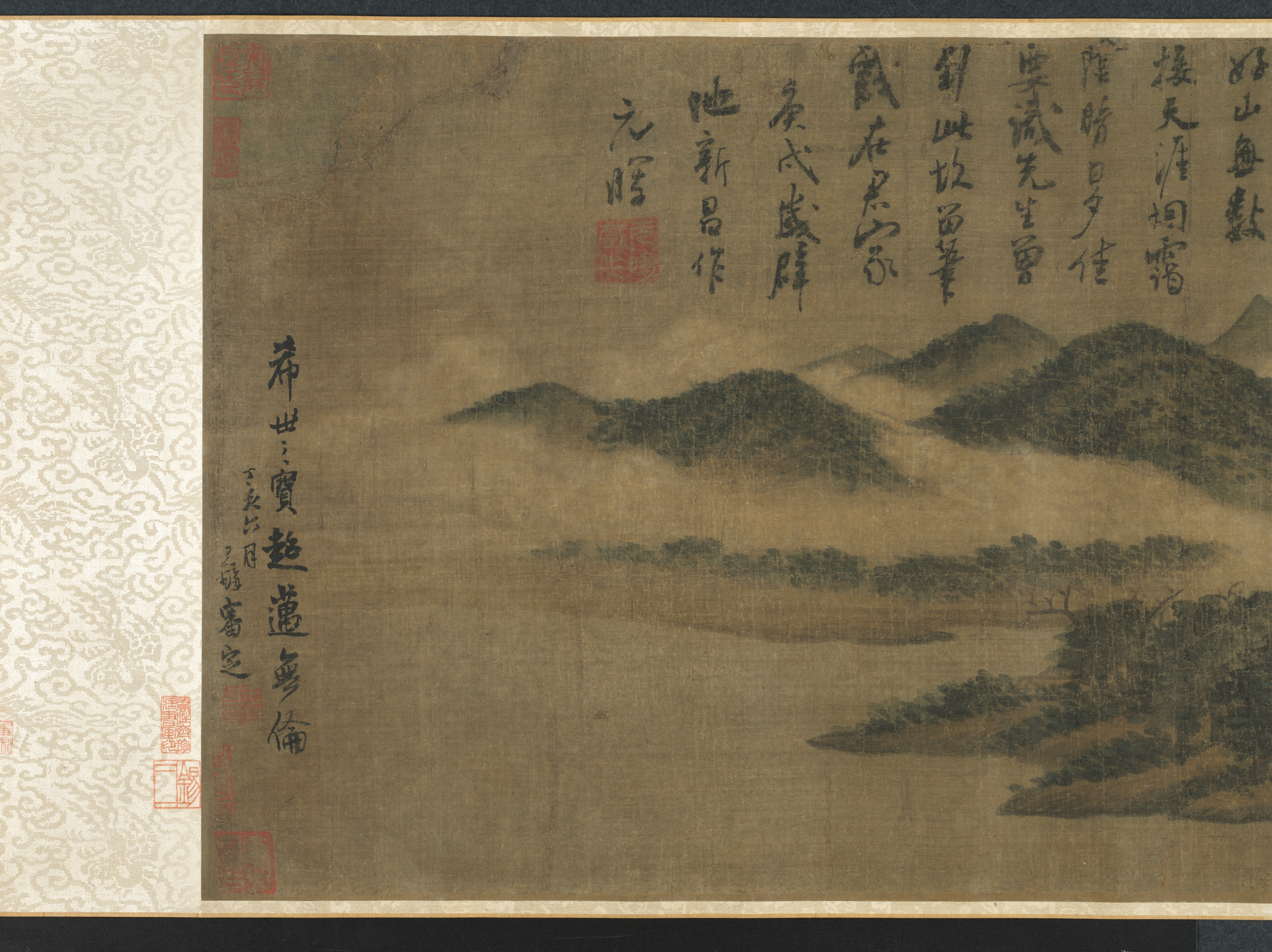
Portion of Cleveland's Cloudy Mountains with Mi's description of his ordeal in 1130.

Mi Youren and his family evacuated Runzhou (潤洲) as the Jurchens sieged Kaifeng, to Jintan (金壇,), and subsequently evacuated to the town of Xinchang (新昌村) as bandits and the Jurchens advanced through Jiangnan (江南).

=== Provenance ===
- Anyang Sun shi (安陽孫氏)
- Bi Long (畢瀧)
- Prince Cheng (永瑆)
- Zigu 子榖; mid-1600s
- Wang To (1592–1652)
- Chen Kuang (陳爌); jinshi 1646, colophon dated 1650
- Xisan (錫三); 1800s
- Yangxing Studio (養性齋珍藏書畫印)
- Zhigai "Li Zaixian 李在銛" (芷陔審定真跡); early 1900s
- Yujian Studio (玉簡齋)
- Wu Changshuo 吳昌碩 (1844–1927)
- Luo Zhenyu 振玉 (1866–1940)
- Naito Torajiro 內藤虎次郎 (1866–1934)
- Nagao Ko 長尾甲 (1864–1942)
- Yamamoto Teijiro 山本悌二郞 (1870–1937)
- Yamanaka & Co. (circa 1933)
- Cleveland Museum of Art; J. H. Wade Fund 1933.220

Subsequently, after acquisition at Cleveland, it was on special exhibit in the Royal Academy of Arts in the 1935-1936 International Exhibition of Chinese Art.

== Research ==
In a study conducted by the Beijing University of Technology and Hongik University, the painting's blur and haze was utilized in a study in cognitive neuroscience and neuroesthetics, wherein the visual impressions and sensation of emotions and good feelings are triggered brushstrokes and blurs utilized in the landscape.
