= Peng Xiancheng =

Chinese artist

Peng Xiancheng (Simplified Chinese: 彭先诚; Hanyu Pinyin: Péng Xiānchéng) (born 1941) is a contemporary Chinese artist based in Chengdu, China, known for his guohua depictions of Tang dynasty ladies on horseback using a 'boneless' style involving carefully controlled drops of ink. He was a close friend of Chen Zizhuang and organised the artist's first posthumous exhibition in 1983. Peng Xiancheng is a mainly self-taught artist who only began painting in the 1970s after years of being a teacher. His daughter Peng Wei is also an artist.
