= Jung Ying Tsao =

American lawyer

Jung Ying Tsao (Chinese: 曹仲英; pinyin: Cáo Zhòngyīng; 1929–2011) was a connoisseur, collector, dealer, and scholar of traditional Chinese art.

Tsao has been publicly recognized by the World Congress of Chinese Collectors as the leading American collector of Chinese painting of his generation. Over his almost 50-year professional career based in the San Francisco Bay Area, he built and helped to build several important collections of Chinese painting, and was friends with significant figures in the Chinese art world. He authored a number of scholarly works on Chinese painting and calligraphy, and collections he assembled have been the subjects of research and exhibition projects by major museums, art academies, and publishing houses.

== Biography ==
Tsao was born in Tianjin, China, in 1929 (Note: United States Social Security Administration records indicate that he was born in 1923, while Tsao asserts he was born in 1929.) to a prominent family that became aligned with China's Nationalist Party, the Kuomintang. His father was named Cao Wenming. In his early years, due to the Chinese Civil War he migrated to Western China, then returned to the North, and finally in 1949, emigrated to Taiwan (Republic of China) to escape the Chinese Communist Revolution. In the 1950s, he managed his family's collection of Chinese paintings and studied Chinese painting connoisseurship under noted art authority Li Lin-ts'an, senior curator at the National Palace Museum (Taipei). He attended law school in Taipei and became a lawyer, then a judge. In 1963 he traveled to the United States and settled in Berkeley, California. Soon thereafter he gave up the practice of law; he became a professional art dealer in the mid-1960s, establishing the art gallery Fine East Fine Arts in San Francisco in 1974, and dedicating the remainder of his life to the preservation and promotion of traditional Chinese art.

== Projects and collections ==
Although his family's collection of Chinese paintings included earlier works, Tsao, while living in Taipei in the 1950s, began to re-focus the collection on more recent artists, in particular those from the "Modern Period" (1840–1966) such as Qi Baishi. He ultimately built a balanced and encyclopedic collection of Modern Chinese painting. He also assembled a comprehensive collection of seventeenth century paintings, a major collection of paintings by the twentieth century landscape master Huang Binhong, and a collection of Chinese seals that ranges from the Warring States period (475 – 221 BCE) through the twentieth century. Tsao has been recognized as a guiding force behind several important private collections such as The Richard Fabian Collection and The Michael Gallis Collection. Many works from Tsao's collection are either parts of the permanent collection or promised gifts to museums including The Metropolitan Museum of Art (New York City), the Asian Art Museum of San Francisco, and the Cleveland Museum of Art.

Tsao's collections, or collections he has built, have been prominently featured in numerous research, publication, and exhibition projects, including:

=== Publications ===
- Chen Siyuan, Craig Yee, Jung Ying Tsao. Modern Ink: The Art of Xugu. Honolulu: University of Hawai'i Press, 2015. ISBN 978-0824851460.
- Britta Erickson, Craig Yee, Jung Ying Tsao. Modern Ink: The Art of Qi Baishi. Honolulu: University of Hawai'i Press, 2014. ISBN 978-0-8248-4766-1.
- Kenneth Wayne ed. Isamu Noguchi and Qi Baishi: Beijing 1930. Milan: 5 Continents Editions, 2013. ISBN 978-8874396399.
- Wan Qingli, Zhao Li, Lu Fusheng, Qian Shaowu, Hou Yimin, Cai Xingyi, Shan Guolin. Selected Masterworks of Modern Chinese Painting: The Tsao Family Mozhai Collection (4 volumes). Shanghai: Shanghai Fine Arts Publishing House, 2010. ISBN 978-7807258483.
- Stephen Little, Jonathan Spence, Chu-Tsing Li, Qianshen Bai, Richard Fabian. New Songs on Ancient Tunes: 19th – 20th Century Chinese Paintings and Calligraphy from the Richard Fabian Collection. Honolulu: Honolulu Academy of Arts, 2007. ISBN 978-0937426791.
- Julia Frances Andrews, Michael Knight, Pauline Yao, Asian Art Museum of San Francisco. Between the Thunder and the Rain: Chinese Paintings from the Opium War through the Cultural Revolution, 1840–1979. San Francisco: Echo Rock Ventures, in association with the Asian Art Museum of San Francisco – Chong-Moon Lee Center for Asian Art and Culture, 2000. ISBN 978-0939117178.
- Li Chu-chin (Chu-tsing Li), Wan Ch'ing-li. Chun-kuo hsien-tai hui-hua-shih: Wan-Ch'ing chih-pu (1840–1911). Taipei: Shih-t'ou ch'u-pan, 1998.
- Jung Ying Tsao. The Paintings of Xugu and Qi Baishi. Seattle and London: University of Washington Press, 1993. ISBN 978-0295973401.
- Shen C. Y. Fu, Jan Stuart. Challenging the Past: the Paintings of Chang Dai-chien. Seattle and London: University of Washington Press, 1991. ISBN 978-0295971254.
- Jung Ying Tsao. Chinese Paintings of the Middle Qing Dynasty. San Francisco: San Francisco Graphic Society, 1987. ISBN 978-0961849306.
- Kei Suzuki ed. Comprehensive Illustrated Catalogue of Chinese Paintings (5 volumes). Tokyo: University of Tokyo Press, 1982. ISBN 978-0860083085.
- Jung Ying Tsao, Joe Huang, James H. Soong. The Four Jens. Far East Fine Arts, Inc., 1977.

=== Exhibitions and loans ===
- Alternative Dreams: 17th Century Chinese Paintings from the Tsao Family Collection. Los Angeles County Museum of Art (LACMA), August 7 – December 4, 2016.
- The 100th Anniversary Exhibition of Huang Binhong. National Art Museum of China, April 4 – May 10, 2015. (Short-term loan of "Album of 172 Sketches After Old Masters" and "Album of 20 Corresponding Sketches, Detailed and Abbreviated")
- The Tsao Family Collection of Seventeenth Century Chinese Painting. Long-term loan to Los Angeles County Museum of Art (LACMA), 2013 – ongoing.
- The Richard Fabian Collection. Long-term loan to Museum of Fine Arts, Houston, 2013 – 2015.
- The Carved Brush: Calligraphy, Painting and Seal Carving by Qi Baishi. Asian Art Museum of San Francisco, October 29, 2013 – July 13, 2014.
- Isamu Noguchi and Qi Baishi: Beijing 1930. University of Michigan Museum of Art, May 18 – September 1, 2013. Noguchi Museum, September 25, 2013 – January 26, 2014.
- Selected Masterworks of Modern Chinese Painting from the Mozhai Collection. Central Academy of Fine Arts (CAFA), Beijing, 2010.
- New Songs on Ancient Tunes: 19th – 20th Century Chinese Paintings and Calligraphy from the Richard Fabian Collection. Honolulu Academy of Arts, August 30 – November 11, 2007.
- Between the Thunder and the Rain: Chinese Paintings from the Opium War through the Cultural Revolution, 1840–1979. Asian Art Museum of San Francisco, October 25, 2000 – January 14, 2001.
- Challenging the Past: the Paintings of Chang Dai-chien. Smithsonian Institution, Sackler Gallery, November 24, 1991 – April 5, 1992.

== Friendships and recognition ==
Tsao was a younger contemporary and friend of the collector C. C. Wang, who collected classical paintings, and thus, was competitive with Tsao only around collecting paintings of the seventeenth century, where their interests overlapped. Tsao also built lasting friendships with fellow art appreciators who lived in or travelled to the San Francisco Bay Area, including the artist Zhang Daqian, professors of Chinese art history Michael Sullivan and Chu-tsing Li (pinyin: Li Zhujin) and their students Wan Qingli, Cai Xingyi, Britta Erickson and James Soong, scholar Fred Fang-yu Wang and the collectors Richard Fabian, Michael Gallis and Michael Shih. As China re-opened in the 1980s and 1990s, Tsao traveled there frequently, building friendships with the Shanghai Museum curators Xie Zhiliu and Zheng Wei, artists Li Keran, Zhu Jichan, Huang Junbi, Lou Shibai, dealer/collectors Robert Zhang (pinyin: Zhang Zongxian) and others. In 2008, Tsao was selected to represent all American collectors and give a keynote address at the first annual World Congress of Chinese Collectors in Shanghai. He was recognized by the organizers for collecting art not for investment, but rather, to elevate the spirit and nurture refinement.

After his death in 2011, Mr. Tsao's heirs established the Mozhai Foundation (in reference to Tsao's studio name), a charitable family foundation dedicated to supporting research and educational programming in the field of traditional Chinese art and culture.
