= Studio 65 =

Italian avant-garde architecture collective

- Founded: 1965
- Headquarters: Turin
- Website: studio65.eu

Studio 65 (Studiosessanta5) is an Italian architecture studio. It was founded in 1965 in Turin as an avant-garde experimental collective of architects, designers, poets and artists. Its founders were Franco Audrito, Roberta Garosci, Enzo Bertone, Paolo Morello, and Paolo Rondelli.

Studio 65 played an essential role in the Radical movement in Italian design in the 1960-70s. Some of the most famous products they designed are the Bocca sofa and Capitello chair. Other notable projects include the Leonardo sofa, which became one of the icons of the Radical Design movement, the interior design of the Casa Canella apartment, the Palladian Villa, as well as the Barbarella nightclub.

Other members of the Radical design movement from Turin were Piero Gatti-Cesare Paolini-Franco Teodoro, LIBIDARCH, Ceretti-Derossi-Rosso, Guido Drocco, Franco Mello, and Piero Gilardi.

Towards the end of the seventies, the collective broke up, and Audrito and Sampanitou - keeping the name Studio 65 - started an Architectural and design activity base in Arab countries, in parallel with a work of re-edition, rediscovery and contamination of some of the most iconic pieces of their production and creation of unique pieces, often produced in collaboration with iconic Made in Italy companies such as Gufram and Savio Firmino. Currently, the firm has offices in Turin, Jeddah, Riyad and Bali.

== Bocca Sofa ==
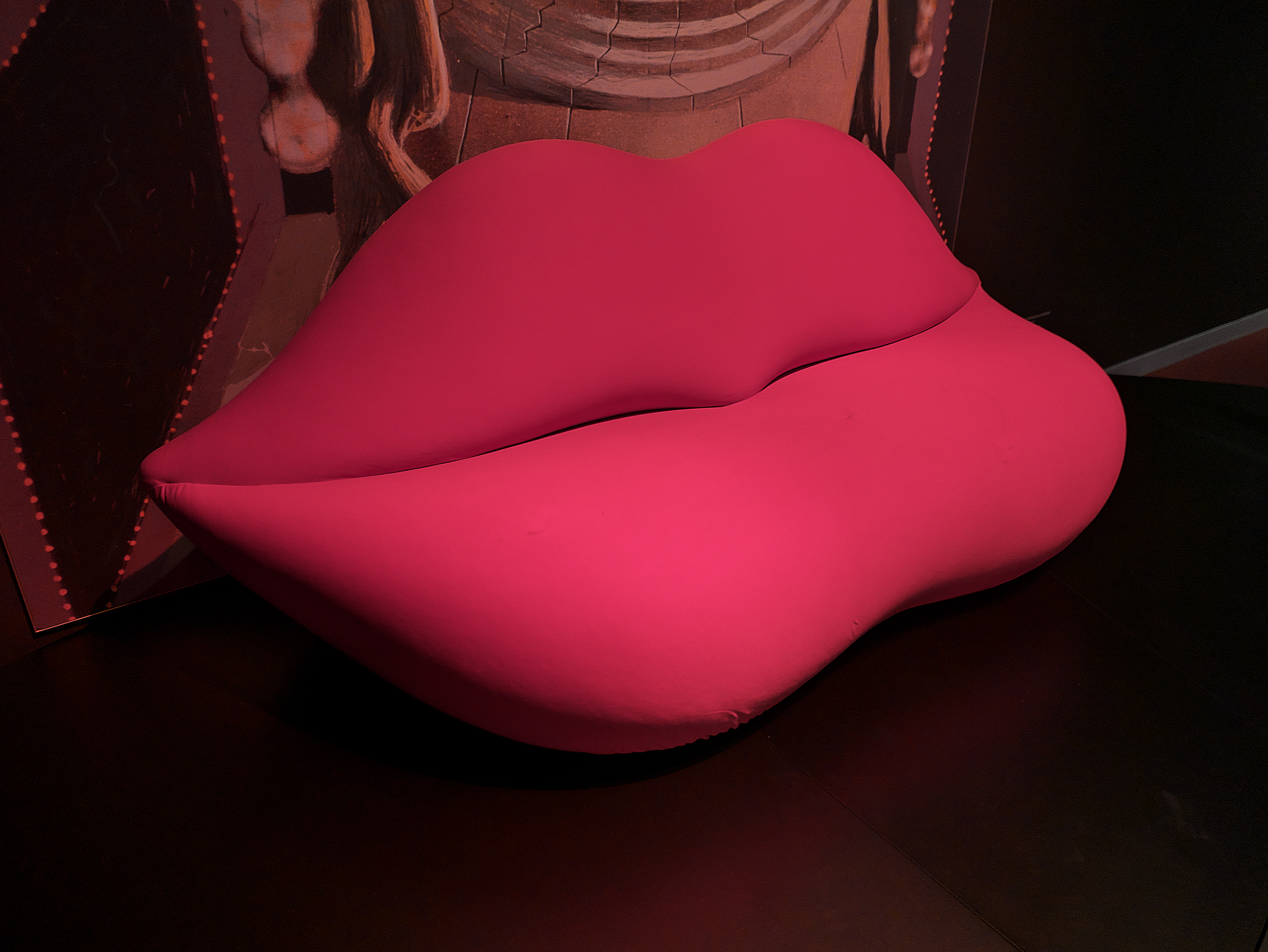
Bocca sofa designed by Studio 65

The Bocca sofa was designed in 1970 as part of the project for a new fitness centre in Milan that Studio 65 was commissioned to complete. The couch was a tribute to Salvador Dali's surrealistic portrait of Mae West. It was made of soft polyurethane upholstered with fabric and produced by Gufram, an Italian furniture manufacturer. The original name was Marilyn, and it was dedicated to Marilyn Monroe as well as the owner of the gym, Marilyn Garosci. According to one of its designers, Franco Audrito, the sofa "spoke out about our obsession with appearance." In 2004 it was introduced in Rotationally Molded Polyethylene with Heller Furniture. The Bocca sofa is still in production by Gufram and Heller Furniture.

== Capitello Chair ==
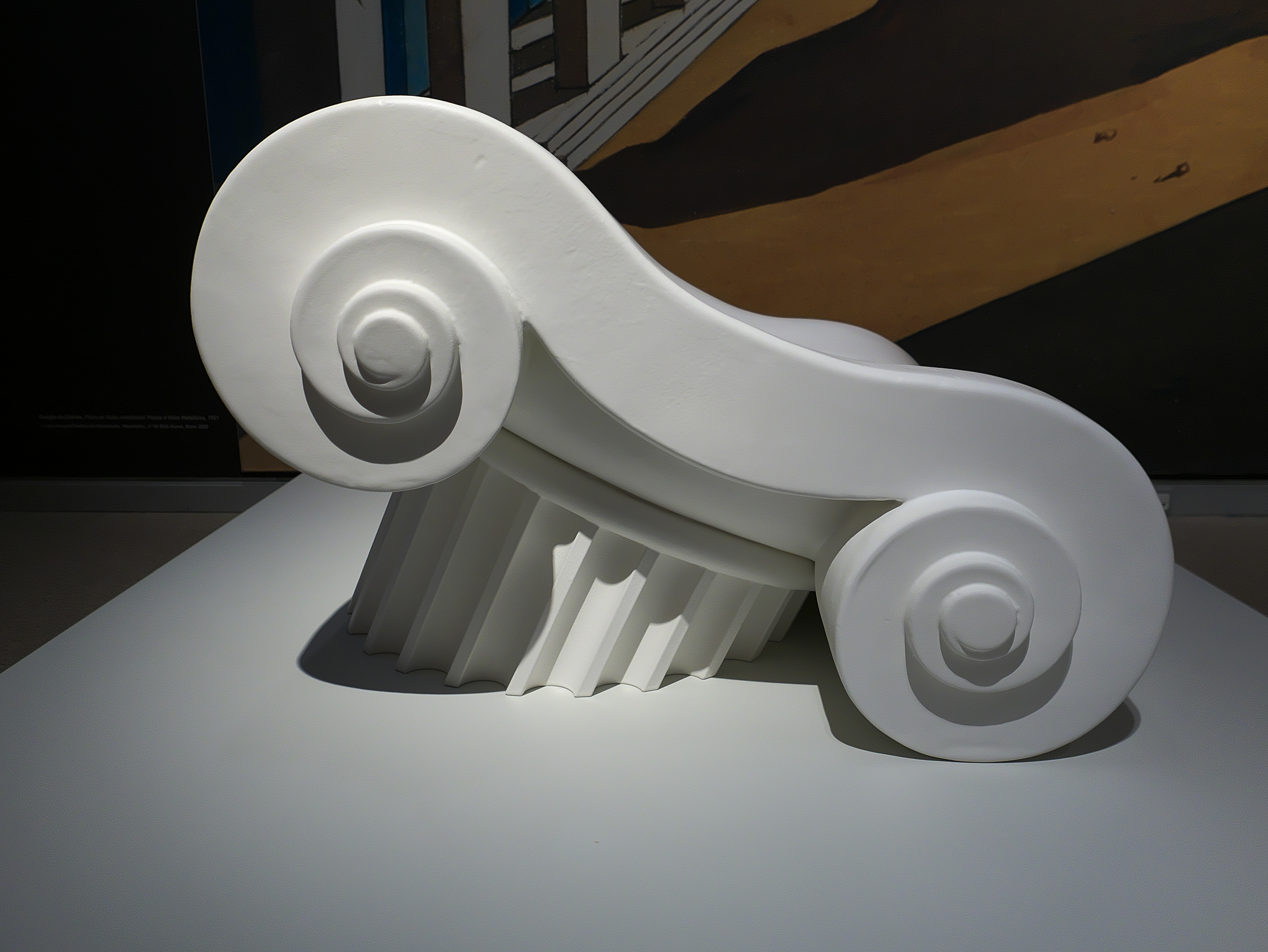
Capitello designed by Studio65

The iconic Capitello Chair was created in 1971 and manufactured by Gufram. Like most design objects created by the Radical Design movement, they were controversial and provocative, aiming to destabilize expectations. As a marketing slogan, they used the statement "To sit on the past." As Maria Cristina Didero writes, "sitting on history" became a clear statement that it was possible to break with traditions and the overwhelming weight of Modernism and fight for your ideas via imaginative expression."

Marilyn/Bocca, Leonardo and Capitello are part of the Vitra Design Museum permanent collection. And were included in the exhibition Pop Art Design by Vitra Design Museum.
