= Yong'an Temple (Mailiao) =

Coordinates: 23.7757°N 120.2449°E

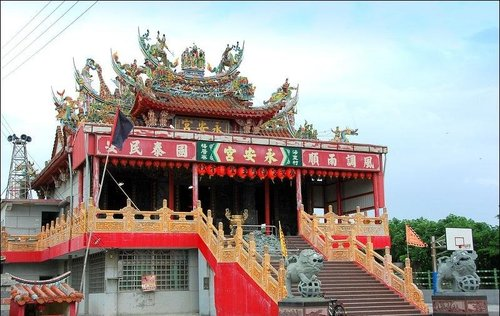

Location
- Location: Mailiao, Yunlin County, Taiwan
- Interactive map of Yong'an Temple

Architecture
- Type: Temple
- Groundbreaking: 18 August 1991

The Yong'an Temple (Chinese: 楊厝永安宮) at Mailiao Township, Yunlin County, Taiwan is a temple dedicated to the deity Kai Zhang Sheng Wang (開漳聖王), who his followers refer to as the "Sacred Duke, Founder of Zhangzhou City".

== History ==
The groundbreaking for the temple was on 18 August 1991. Most of the structure was completed within a year. The original temple name was the "Yongji temple". It was later renamed the Yong'an Temple or Temple of Everlasting Peace.

== Worship ==
- Kai Zhang Sheng Wang
- Wu Xiao Kuan
- San Tai Zi
- Tu Di Gong
- Songzi Niangniang
- Tiger God

== Cultural activities ==
- Chen Yuanguang's birthday: October 3 (on the Chinese calendar)
