= Mailiao Refinery =

Oil refinery in Mailiao, Yunlin County, Taiwan

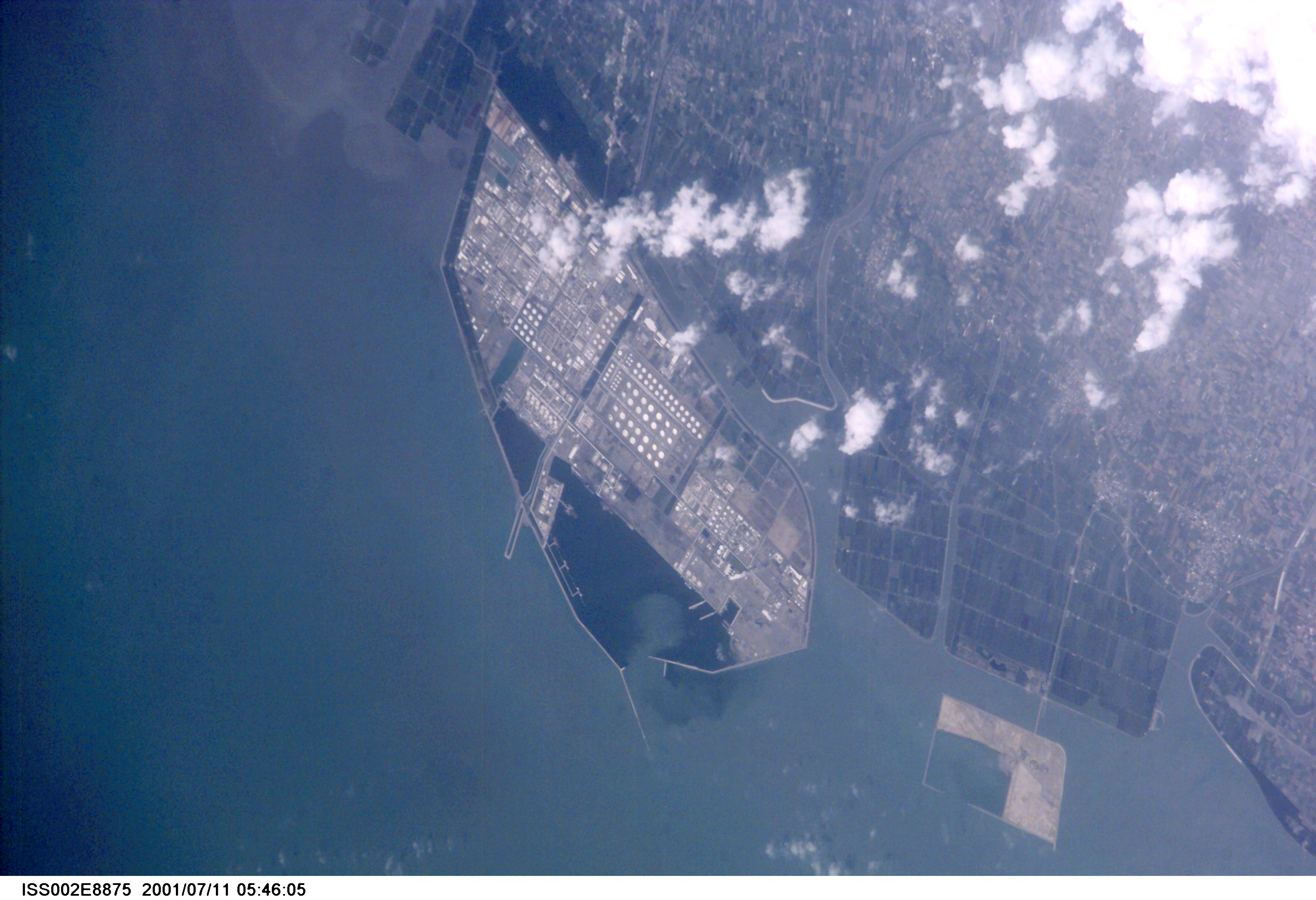

- Location within Yunlin County
- Location: Mailiao, Yunlin County, Taiwan; 23°47′32.4″N 120°11′41.6″E

Refinery details
- Owner: Formosa Plastics Corp
- Opened: 2000
- Capacity: 540,000 barrels per day (86,000 m^{3}/d)

The Mailiao Refinery is an oil refinery complex on an artificial island in Mailiao Township, Yunlin County, Taiwan.

== History ==
The refinery began its first phase of production in 2000 with a capacity of 150,000 barrels per day. In 2002, it reached its full capacity at 450,000 barrels per day.

== Architecture ==
The refinery consists of 28 storage tanks for crude oil with an individual capacity of 130,000 m^{3}.

== Incidents ==
- On 6 September 2011, a fire broke out at Formosa Petrochemical's No. 3 refinery plant. The fire started because of a leakage during the start of an alkylation unit at the plant but was put out within 30 minutes.
- On 15 July 2020, a fire broke out at No. 2 residual desulphurization unit.

== See also ==
- List of oil refineries
- Mining in Taiwan
