= Peng Wei =

Chinese artist

- Born: 1974 (age 51–52); Chengdu, China
- Occupation: Artist

Peng Wei (Simplified Chinese: 彭 薇; Hanyu Pinyin: Péng Wēi) (born 1974) is a contemporary Chinese artist from Sichuan, China.

== Early life and education ==
In 1974, Peng was born in Chengdu, Sichuan province, China. Peng's father is Peng Xiancheng.

Peng graduated from Nankai University with a BA in fine arts in 1997, and earned a Masters of Philosophy in Aesthetics in 2000.

== Work and themes ==
The Beijing-based artist's works often feature classical ink and color painting, depicting landscapes of trees, rivers, and pagodas. Her work reflects on the impact of globalization upon China's cultural heritage, often also featuring motifs of fashion and production. Her paintings are often placed on unconventional materials, such as the insides of shoes or molded torsos or legs made of rice paper, resembling the mannequins from which they were modeled. One series of works also included paintings of classical Chinese robes on paper and silk. Her mixed-media works deal with collective history, representation and replication, and often have a calligraphic element. After completing a painting, Peng will create a digital reproduction that is placed in conjuncture with the handcrafted original. Her work often contains a slight subversion of what initially appear to be strictly traditional works. Her work on clothing and shoes can also be read as delving into themes of embodiment, femininity, and history.

Peng collaborated with the Italian shoe brand Sergio Rossi, to create ten editions of hand painted rice paper boots.

=== Letters ===
Her work, "Letters From a Distance", 2012, won the APB Foundation Signature Art Prize 2014. Consisting of materials such as handmade linen paper, jade pins, and oxbone scrollbars, Peng draws upon tradition, fixing upon such techniques as an end to themselves for exploration, rather than a medium. Peng also subverts her medium in Try to Write Me a Letter, 2013, and Two Ends of a Cloud, 2013, where delicate ink paintings are accompanied by the translation of two letters, one from Austrian poet Ingeborg Bachmann to Paul Celan, an important World War II poet, another from Romantic poet Percy Bysshe Shelley to John Keats. Keats later died, and Bachmann's affair with Celan fell apart. At first glance, the accompaniment appears ordinary, but the themes of love, longing, sorrow and loss are echoed by the depiction of a parting at the shore, and another scene of a scholar looking out over an embankment, as boats are moored and unloaded. While the comparison may appear clear, the expression of emotion as restrained within the paintings, but vividly described within the letters emphasize cultural differences. Peng's body of work continues to delve into these themes of yearning, a sense of alienation, and nostalgia for the past.

== Awards and recognitions ==
From 2000 to 2006 she was editor for Yishu art magazine. She was one of 25 artists included in the "Contemporary Art from China: Visual Expression Through Ink and Paper" exhibition. Her work has been featured in exhibitions at the He Xiangning Museum in Shenzheng, the National Art Museum of China in Beijing, the National Art Museum of Malaysia, Fukuoka Art Museum in Yokohama, and Kunstmuseum Luzern in Switzerland. Her work resides in the permanent collection of the National Museum of Art in China, the Brooklyn Museum, the Asian Art Center of San Francisco, and the Hong Kong Museum of Art.
