= Jerome Silbergeld =

American scholar of Chinese art history

Jerome L. Silbergeld is an American scholar of Chinese art history. He has taught at Princeton University and the University of Washington.

== Education ==
Silbergeld received his B.A. from Stanford University in 1966 and completed an M.A. in American history there in 1967. In 1966 and 1967, he served as a United States Senate intern for Stuart Symington. He received a second M.A. in art history from the University of Oregon in 1972 and completed his Ph.D. in Chinese art history from Stanford University in 1974.

== Career ==
Silbergeld is the P.Y. and Kinmay W. Tang Professor (Emeritus) of Chinese Art History at Princeton University and was the founding director of Princeton’s Tang Center for East Asian Art. He was formerly the Chair of Art History and Director of the School of Art and the University of Washington, where he taught for twenty-five years. Silbergeld has also served as a visiting professor at Harvard University and as a Nirit and Michael Shaoul Fellow at the Institute for Advanced Study at Tel Aviv University. In 1999, he participated as a "referee" in The Metropolitan Museum of Art symposium "Issues of Authenticity in Chinese Art," donning an referee's jersey and whistle. He is currently a visiting faculty member at the University of Oregon, and received the school's Ellis F. Lawrence Medal for distinguished alumni of its College of Design in 2016.

Silbergeld's research includes traditional and modern Chinese painting, cinema, and architecture and gardens. His publications include Chinese Painting Style (1982); Mind Landscapes: The Paintings of C. C. Wang (1987); Contradictions: Artistic Life, the Socialist State, and the Chinese Painter Li Huasheng (1993); Hitchock with a Chinese Face (2004); Body in Question: Image and Illusion in Two Chinese Films by Director Jiang Wen (2008); and Outside In: Chinese x American x Contemporary x Art (2009). He has also published more than sixty articles, encyclopaedia entries, and book reviews.

== Personal life ==
He is married to a clinical psychologist who specializes in early childhood development.

== Selected publications ==
- Chinese Painting Style (1982)
- Mind Landscapes: The Paintings of C. C. Wang (1987)
- Contradictions: Artistic Life, the Socialist State, and the Chinese Painter Li Huasheng (1993)
- China Into Film: Frames of Reference in Contemporary Chinese Cinema (1999)
- Hitchock with a Chinese Face (2004)
- "Changing Views of Change: The Song-Yuan Transition in Chinese Painting Histories," in Asian Art History in the Twenty-first Century, edited by Vishakha Desai (2007)
- Body in Question: Image and Illusion in Two Chinese Films by Director Jiang Wen (2008)
- Outside In: Chinese x American x Contemporary x Art (2009)
- Humanism in China: A Contemporary Record of Photography (2009)
- "All Receding Together, One Hundred Slanting Lines: Replication, Variation, and Some Fundamental Problems in the Study of Chinese Paintings of Architecture," in Masterpieces of Ancient Chinese Paintings: Paintings from the Tang to Yuan Dynasty in Japanese and Chinese Collections (2010)
- Bridges to Heaven: Essays in East Asian Art in Honor of Wen C. Fong (2 volumes, 2011), editor
- "Cinema and the Visual Arts of China," in A Companion to Chinese Cinema, edited by Yingjin Zhang (2012)
- "First Lines, Final Scenes in Text, Handscroll, and Chinese Cinema," in Looking at Asian Art, edited by Katherine Tsiang and Martin Powers (2012)
