= Maximalism =

Art movement

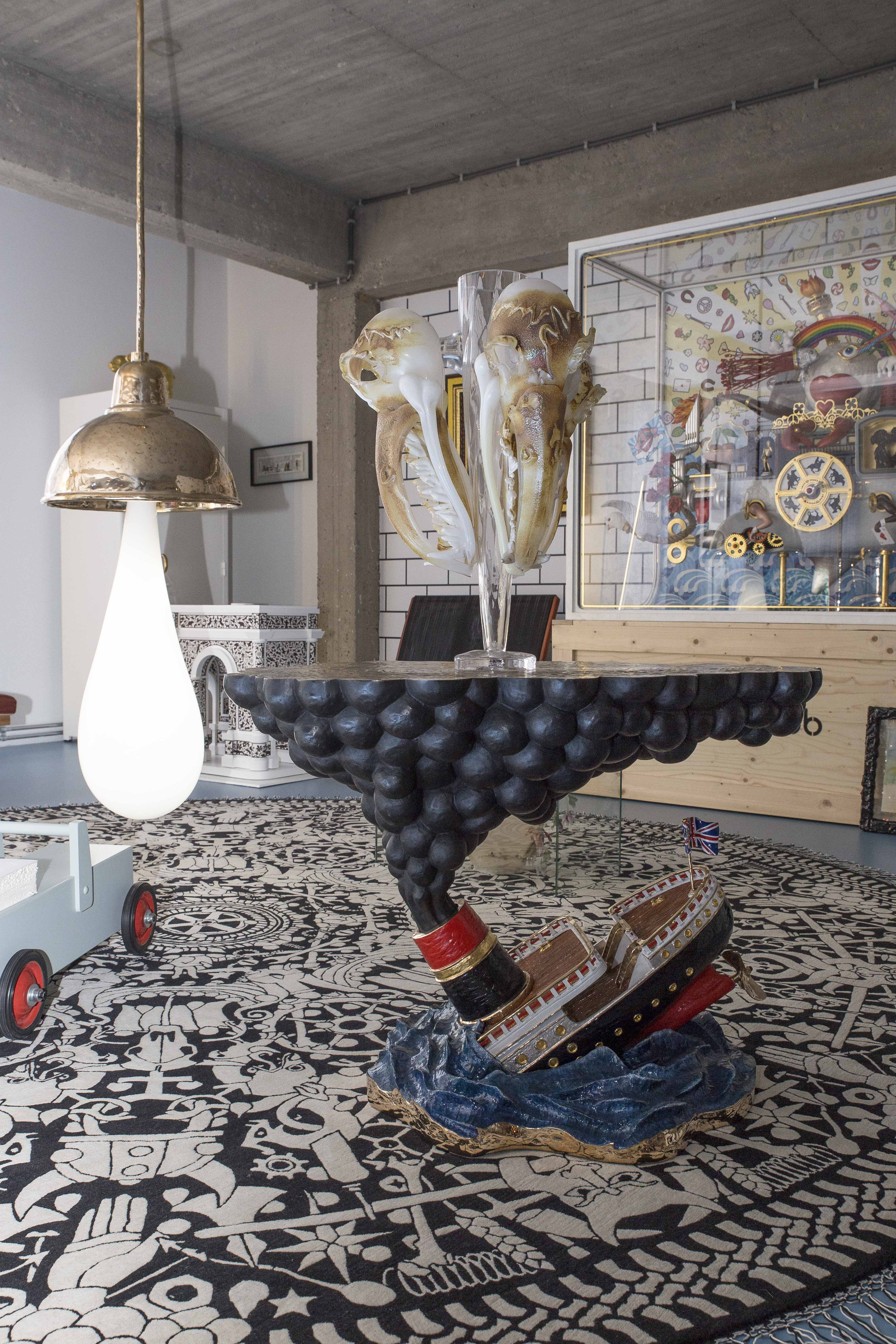
Studio Job Headquarters, Antwerp, Belgium, by Job Smeets, 2018

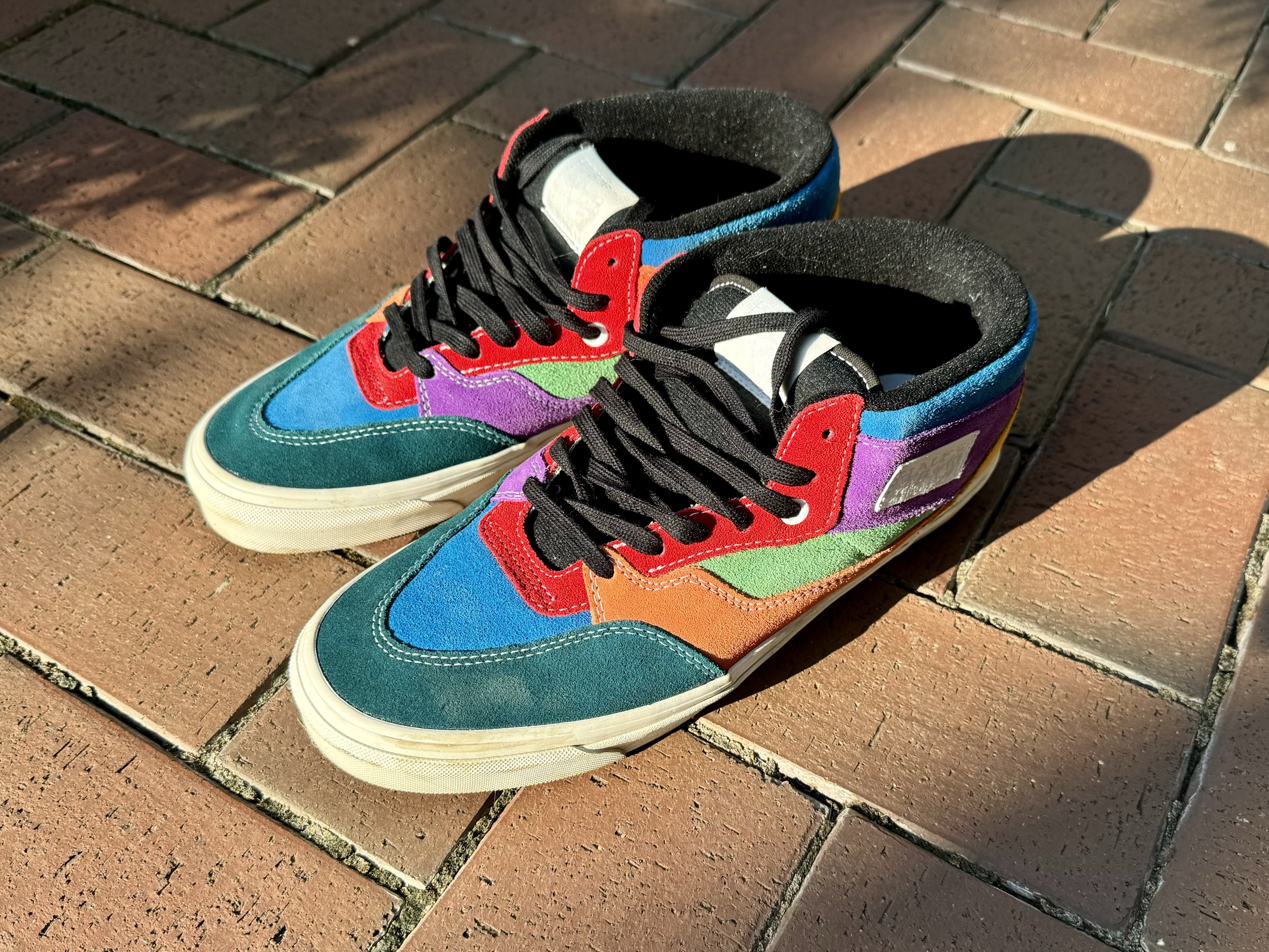
Vans Half Cab 33 DX 30th Anniversary shoes, an example of maximalist design

In the arts, maximalism is an aesthetic characterized by excess and abundance, serving as a reaction against minimalism. The philosophy can be summarized as "more is more", contrasting with the minimalist principle of "less is more".

== Literature ==
The term maximalism is sometimes associated with postmodern novels, such as those by David Foster Wallace and Thomas Pynchon, where digression, reference, and elaboration of detail occupy a great fraction of the text. It can refer to anything seen as excessive, overtly complex and "showy", providing redundant overkill in features and attachments, grossness in quantity and quality, or the tendency to add and accumulate to excess.

Novelist John Barth defines literary maximalism through the medieval Roman Catholic Church's opposition between "two...roads to grace":

the via negativa of the monk's cell and the hermit's cave, and the via affirmativa of immersion in human affairs, of being in the world whether or not one is of it. Critics have aptly borrowed those terms to characterize the difference between Mr. Beckett, for example, and his erstwhile master James Joyce, himself a maximalist except in his early works.

Literary scholar Takayoshi Ishiwari elaborates on Barth's definition by including a postmodern approach to the notion of authenticity. Thus:

Under this label come such writers as, among others, Thomas Pynchon and Barth himself, whose bulky books are in marked contrast with Barthelme's relatively thin novels and collections of short stories. These maximalists are called by such an epithet because they, situated in the age of epistemological uncertainty and therefore knowing that they can never know what is authentic and inauthentic, attempt to include in their fiction everything belonging to that age, to take these authentic and inauthentic things as they are with all their uncertainty and inauthenticity included; their work intends to contain the maximum of the age, in other words, to be the age itself, and because of this their novels are often encyclopedic. As Tom LeClair argues in The Art of Excess, the authors of these "masterworks" even "gather, represent, and reform the time's excesses into fictions that exceed the time's literary conventions and thereby master the time, the methods of fiction, and the reader".

=== Maximalist novels ===
In his book, Stefano Ercolino lists these seven titles as maximalist novels:

- Gravity's Rainbow (Thomas Pynchon, 1973)
- Infinite Jest (David Foster Wallace, 1996)
- Underworld (Don DeLillo, 1997)
- White Teeth (Zadie Smith, 2000)
- The Corrections (Jonathan Franzen, 2001)
- 2666 (Roberto Bolaño, 2004)
- 2005 dopo Cristo (Babette Factory, 2005)

Central to his notions of literary maximalism, Ercolino lists ten characteristics which all seven novels show to some extent, and thus leads him to propose maximalism as a subgenre, these characteristics are:

1. Length
2. Encyclopedic mode
3. Dissonant chorality
4. Diegetic exuberance
5. Completeness
6. Narratorial omniscience
7. Paranoid imagination
8. Intersemioticity
9. Ethical commitment
10. Hybrid realism

== Music ==
In music, Richard Taruskin uses the term "maximalism" to describe the modernism of the period from 1890 to 1914, especially in German-speaking regions, defining it as "a radical intensification of means toward accepted or traditional ends". This view has been challenged, however, on the grounds that Taruskin uses the term merely as an "empty signifier" that is filled with "a range of musical features—big orchestration, motivic and harmonic complexity, and so on—that he takes to be typical of modernism". Taruskin, in any case, did not originate this sense of the term, which had been used by the mid-1960s with reference to Russian composers of the same period, of whom Sergei Prokofiev was "the last". Contemporary maximalist music is defined by composer David A. Jaffe as that which "embraces heterogeneity and allows for complex systems of juxtapositions and collisions, in which all outside influences are viewed as potential raw material". Examples include the music of Edgard Varèse, Charles Ives, Frank Zappa, and Captain Beefheart. In a different sense, Milton Babbitt has been described as a "professed maximalist", his goal being, "to make music as much as it can be rather than as little as one can get away with". Richard Toop, on the other hand, considers that musical maximalism "is to be understood at least partly as 'antiminimalism'". Phil Spector's highly influential "Wall of Sound" recording technique, present in recordings such as the Ronettes' "Be My Baby" and the Beach Boys' Pet Sounds (1966) (the former, produced by Spector) has been described as maximalist. English rock band Oasis' albums (What's the Story) Morning Glory? (1995) and Be Here Now (1997), along with rapper Kanye West's My Beautiful Dark Twisted Fantasy (2010) have also been described as maximalist works. Charlemagne Palestine describes his drone-based music as maximalist.

== Visual arts ==
Maximalism as a term in the plastic arts is used by art historian Robert Pincus-Witten to describe a group of artists, including future Oscar-nominated filmmaker Julian Schnabel and David Salle, associated with the turbulent beginnings of Neo-expressionism in the late 1970s. These artist were in part "stimulated out of sheer despair with so long a diet of Reductivist Minimalism". This maximalism was prefigured in the mid-1960s by certain psychoanalytically oriented paintings by Gary Stephan.

Art historian Gao Minglu connects maximalism in Chinese visual art to the literary definition by describing the emphasis on "the spiritual experience of the artist in the process of creation as a self-contemplation outside and beyond the artwork itself...These artists pay more attention to the process of creation and the uncertainty of meaning and instability in a work. Meaning is not reflected directly in a work because they believe that what is in the artist's mind at the moment of creation may not necessarily appear in his work." Examples include the work of artists Ding Yi and Li Huasheng.

In 1995 the "antipreneurial" one-man artist group Stiletto presented LESS function IS MORE fun as a post-neoist special waste sale of interpassive design-defuncts in a so-called Spätverkauf installation by Laura Kikauka at the Volksbühne Berlin, which she claimed as one of her projects of Maximalism.

== Fashion ==
Maximalism in fashion is a vibrant and exuberant style that embraces bold colours, intricate patterns, and eclectic combinations. This aesthetic celebrates the idea of "more is more," encouraging individuals to express their creativity and personality through layered textures, diverse prints, and unexpected pairings. Unlike minimalism, which emphasizes simplicity and restraint, maximalism invites a playful approach to dressing, often incorporating vintage pieces, statement accessories, and a mix of cultural influences. As a response to the often sterile nature of contemporary fashion, maximalism allows for a rich tapestry of self-expression, making it a popular choice among those who seek to stand out and make a statement in their wardrobe.

== See also ==
- Baroque
- Collage
- Gesamtkunstwerk
- Horror vacui
- Hyperpop
- Hysterical realism
- Maximalist film
- Minimalism
- New Complexity
- Postminimalism
- Principle of plenitude
