= Ming Tsao =

Chinese American composer

Ming Tsao (Chinese: 曹明; pinyin: Cáo Míng) is a Chinese American composer based in Berlin, Germany.

== Biography ==
Born in Berkeley, California, Ming Tsao is the son of Jung Ying Tsao (曹仲英), who emigrated to California from Tianjin, China and was a collector and scholar of Chinese painting. His mother, Elna Hoeber, began Ming Tsao's musical education at the age of five with the violin. Her father, Frank Hoeber, was a violinist who emigrated to Colorado from Vienna, Austria and played first violin in the Denver Symphony Orchestra. As a student, Ming Tsao traveled to Suzhou, China for a year to study the traditional zither (guqin: 古琴) with the renowned guqin performer Wu Zhaoji (吳兆基). He received graduate degrees in music composition, ethnomusicology, and mathematics.

Ming Tsao was Professor of Composition at University of Gothenburg, Sweden and Visiting Professor of Composition at the Hanover University of Music, Drama and Media in Germany and is currently the Birge–Cary Professor of Music at the University at Buffalo in New York. In 2021, he was awarded a Guggenheim for music composition. His music is published by Edition Peters and has been released on the Kairos, Mode and NEOS CD labels.

== Style ==
Ming Tsao's musical style combines what he calls the "materiality" or sensuality arising from the inherent qualities of sound, with a formal, precise rigour in compositional style. His compositions have been described as "virtuosic" and the work of "a highly complex thinking" conveying a "multitude of fantastic orchestrational details", and a "genuinely dazzling range of invention."

His opera Die Geisterinsel ("The Ghost Island"), based on William Shakespeare's The Tempest, was premiered by the Stuttgart Opera House for a first run of performances and was subsequently given a second run of performances at the Gothenburg Opera House (under the Swedish title Prosperos Trädgård or "Prospero's Garden") with an additional second act titled Mirandas Atemwende ("Miranda's Breathturn"). The opera was reviewed by Opernwelt as "having broken the prejudice that New Music after Strauss has lost its capacity to be sensual." Other notable projects have included two works for large ensemble: Refuse Collection, an hommage to the oeuvre of French filmmakers Danièle Huillet and Jean-Marie Straub premiered at the Academy of Arts in Berlin; and Plus Minus, a full realisation of Karlheinz Stockhausen's open composition of the same name, reviewed as a "very powerful work that one experiences as if by Stockhausen himself," which was premiered at the Witten Days for New Chamber Music. In addition to his research on mathematical applications to music composition, his principal interest has been the relation between poetry and music composition. He has focused his musical works on the poetry of Paul Celan, Su Hui (苏蕙) and J.H. Prynne.

== Notable works ==
=== Musical Compositions ===
- Dritte Stimme zu Bachs zweistimmigen Rätselkanons (2023), open instrumentation
- Triode Variations (2019 – 20), large ensemble
- Dritte Stimme zu Bachs zweistimmigen Inventionen (2019), clavichord
- Plus or Minus (2017 – 18), two pianos and electronics
- Refuse Collection (2017), large ensemble
- Das wassergewordene Kanonbuch (2016 – 17), chamber choir
- Mirandas Atemwende (2014 – 15), chamber opera
- Plus Minus (2012 – 13), large ensemble
- Serenade (2012), large ensemble
- Die Geisterinsel (2010 – 11), chamber opera
- (Un)cover (2008), seven instruments
- If ears were all that were needed... (2007), solo guitar
- Pathology of Syntax (2006 – 07), string quartet
- One–Way Street (2006), six instruments
- The Book of Virtual Transcriptions (2004 – 05), seven instruments
- Not Reconciled (2002 – 03), five instruments
- Canon (2001), clarinet and cello

=== Recordings ===
- Ming Tsao: Plus or Minus, NEOS Music, 2025 (NEOS 12530)
- Ming Tsao: Triode Variations, Kairos Music, 2022 (0015105KAI)
- Ming Tsao: Plus Minus, Kairos Music, 2017 (0015014KAI)
- Ming Tsao: Die Geisterinsel, Kairos Music, 2014 (0013372KAI)
- Ming Tsao: Pathology of Syntax, Mode Records, 2014 (mode 268)

=== Prose ===
- Josel, Seth F. and Tsao, Ming. Techniques of Guitar Playing. Kassel: Bärenreiter, 2014. ISBN 9783761822432.
- Tsao, Ming. "Reverse Transkriptionen: Auf dem Weg zu einem materialistischen musikalischen Ausdruck," MusikTexte 175 (November 2022), 34–41 (in German).
- Tsao, Ming. "Helmut Lachenmann's 'Sound Types'," Perspectives of New Music, Volume 52, Number 1 (Winter 2014): 217–238.
- Tsao, Ming. Abstract Musical Intervals: Group Theory for Composition and Analysis, Musurgia Universalis Press, Berkeley, CA., 2010. ISBN 978-1430308355.

== Bibliography ==
Bork, Camilla. "Diesseits und Jenseits der Gartens: zum Musiktheater Ming Tsaos," Musik & Ästhetik 22, 2/2018: 49–62 (in German).
