= Chen Zizhuang =

Chinese artist

Chen Zizhuang (Simplified Chinese: 陈子庄; Hanyu Pinyin: Chén Zizhuāng) (1913–1976) was a Chinese artist from Wanxian in Sichuan province. He trained in the gongbi tradition but changed to a more expressive xieyi (寫意) style in his sixties following the styles of Qi Baishi and Huang Binhong. He taught at Sichuan Normal University in Chengdu. He died poor and destitute but his work was rediscovered after his death, prompting Yan Xiaohuai to characterise him as 'the Chinese van Gogh'. He influenced many Chinese artists including Li Huasheng and Wu Fan.
