= Li Huasheng =

Chinese artist

- Born: Li Huasheng; 1944; Yibin, China
- Died: 26 February 2018 (aged 73–74)
- Known for: Painting
- Movement: Maximalism

Li Huasheng (Simplified Chinese: 李华生; Hanyu Pinyin: Lǐ Huáshēng) (1944–2018) was a Chinese artist from Yibin in Sichuan province. He received his first art training in one of Chongqing's culture halls. He met Chen Zizhuang in 1972, and studied traditional Chinese painting under him, mastering his style in just four years.

Li's fame was so great that in 1980, he was invited to showcase his art for Chinese paramount leader Deng Xiaoping. In 1985 he was elected an honorary member of the Sichuan Academy of Fine Arts, and the following year was accepted into the Sichuan Academy of Poetry, Calligraphy, and Painting.

Li's life has been extensively chronicled in Jerome Silbergeld and Gong Jisui's Contradictions: Artistic Life, The Socialist State, and the Chinese Painter Li Huasheng, and his life has been said to "[epitomize] the path of the artist in socialist China".

== Exhibitions ==
=== Solo exhibitions ===
2016

- Li Huasheng: The Meditation Room, Mayor Gallery, London, U.K.
- Li Huasheng, Art Basel, Hong Kong Convention and Exhibition Center, Hong Kong, China

2014

- Li Huasheng: Process, Mind, and Landscape, Ink Studio, Beijing, China

2010

- Show for 10 Art Cases, Shanghai 800 Art Zone, Shanghai, China

2006

- Li Huasheng: New Literati Paintings, Alisan Fine Arts, Hong Kong, China

2005

- Li Huasheng, Alisan Fine Arts, Hong Kong, China

1998

- Li Huasheng: An Individualistic Artist, Chinese Culture Center, San Francisco, U.S.A.; Alisan Fine Arts, Hong Kong, China

1992

- Solo exhibition, National Museum of Singapore, Singapore

1991

- Solo exhibition, Hanart Gallery, Taipei, Taiwan
- Solo exhibition, Hong Kong City Hall, Hong Kong

1987

- Solo exhibition, Harvard Art Museums, Cambridge; Yale University Art Gallery, New Haven; University of Michigan Museum of Art, Ann Arbor; Henry Art Gallery, University of Washington, Seattle; and Detroit Institute of Art, Detroit, U.S.A.

1984

- Solo exhibition, Du Fu Thatched Cottage, Chengdu, China

=== Major group exhibitions ===
2017

- Streams and Mountains without End: Landscape Traditions of China, The Metropolitan Museum of Art, New York, U.S.A.

2013

- Ink Art: Past as Present in Contemporary China, The Metropolitan Museum of Art, New York, U.S.A.

2010

- The Great Celestial Abstraction: Chinese Art in the 21st Century, National Art Museum of China, Beijing, China; Katherine E. Nash Gallery, University of Minnesota, Minneapolis, U.S.A.

2007

- A Tradition Redefined: Modern and Contemporary Chinese Ink Paintings from the Chu-tsing Li Collection 1950–2000, Harvard Art Museums, Cambridge; Phoenix Art Museum, Phoenix; Spencer Museum of Art, Lawrence; Norton Museum of Art, West Palm Beach, U.S.A.

2005

- Metaphysics 2005 – Black and White, Shanghai Art Museum, Shanghai, China
- Korean-Chinese Contemporary Ink Painting, Seoul Museum of Art, Seoul, South Korea
- Ink and Paper – Exhibition of Contemporary Chinese Art, Guangdong Museum of Art, Guangdong, China; Kunsthalle, Weimar, Germany

2001

- 1st Space for Contemporary Ink Work – China: 20 Years of Ink Experiment 1980–2001, Guangdong Museum of Art, Guangzhou, China

1995

- Twentieth Century Chinese Painting: Tradition and Innovation, Hong Kong Museum of Art, Hong Kong; Singapore Art Museum, Singapore; British Museum, London, UK; Museum für Ostasiatische Kunst, Cologne, Germany.

1983–85

- Contemporary Chinese Painting: An Exhibition from the People's Republic of China, Chinese Culture Center, San Francisco; Birmingham Museum of Art, Birmingham; Asia Society, New York; Herbert F. Johnson Museum of Art, Cornell University, Ithaca; Denver Art Museum, Denver; Indianapolis Museum of Art, Indianapolis; Nelson-Atkins Museum of Art, Kansas City; University Art Museum, University of Minnesota, Minneapolis, U.S.A.

1981

- Rivers And Mountains Resemble Paintings: Exhibition of Paintings by Ten People, National Art Museum of China, Beijing, China

== Selected collections ==
- National Art Museum of China, Beijing, China
- Shanghai Art Museum, Shanghai, China
- Guangdong Museum of Art, Guangzhou, China
- He Xiangning Art Museum – OCT Contemporary Art Terminal, Shenzhen, China
- M+ Museum, Hong Kong, China
- The Metropolitan Museum of Art, New York, U.S.A.
- The Art Institute of Chicago, Chicago, U.S.A.
- Los Angeles County Museum of Art, Los Angeles, U.S.A.
- Harvard Art Museums, Cambridge, U.S.A.
- Yale University Art Gallery, Newhaven, U.S.A.
- Henry Art Gallery, University of Washington, Seattle, U.S.A.
- British Museum, London, U.K.
