= Job Smeets =

Dutch-Belgian designer

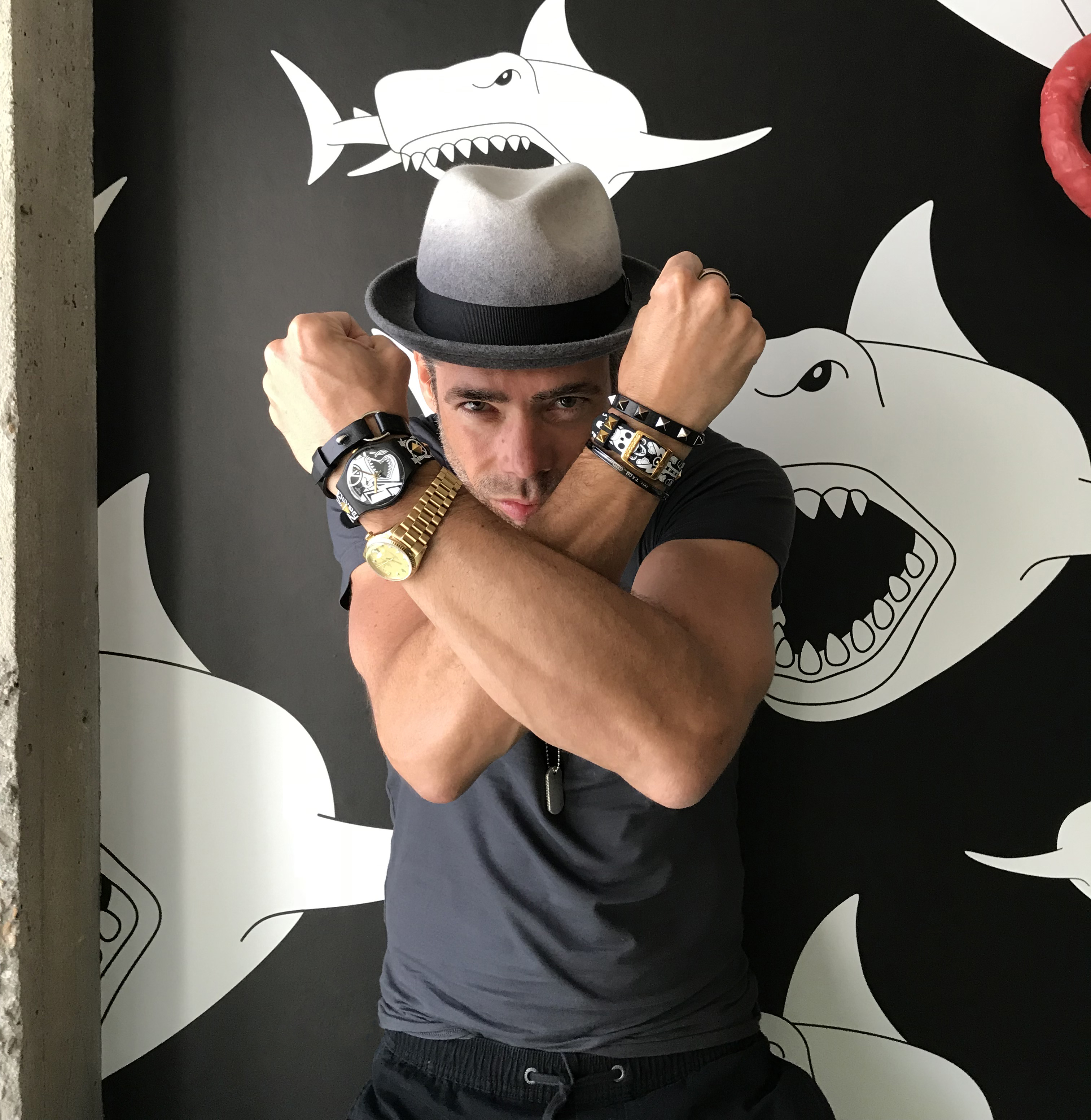
Job Smeets in his Antwerp Apartment, 2018

Job Smeets (born 19 December 1969) is a Belgian contemporary conceptual and sculptural artist and designer and founder of Studio Job based in Antwerp, Belgium. Known for producing "high-end works toying with politically loaded signifiers", he combines traditional and modern techniques to produce art and design objects.

== Early career ==
Job Smeets was born in Hamont-Achel, Belgium. Before moving to Eindhoven in the Netherlands to study, he graduated cum laude in 1996 from the Eindhoven Design Academy. During his studies, he formed 'Oval Design' with Hugo Timmermans, a design agency that launched the clock 'Take your Time' with which Smeets had his first solo show 'Oval in The House' at Frozen Fountain, Amsterdam in 1995. They then developed inflatable lamps 'Bumperlights' for Droog Design that where exhibited at the 'Plastic New Treat' show in Milan in 1996. Job Smeets founded his own art and design studio 'Studio Job' in 1998.

== Work ==
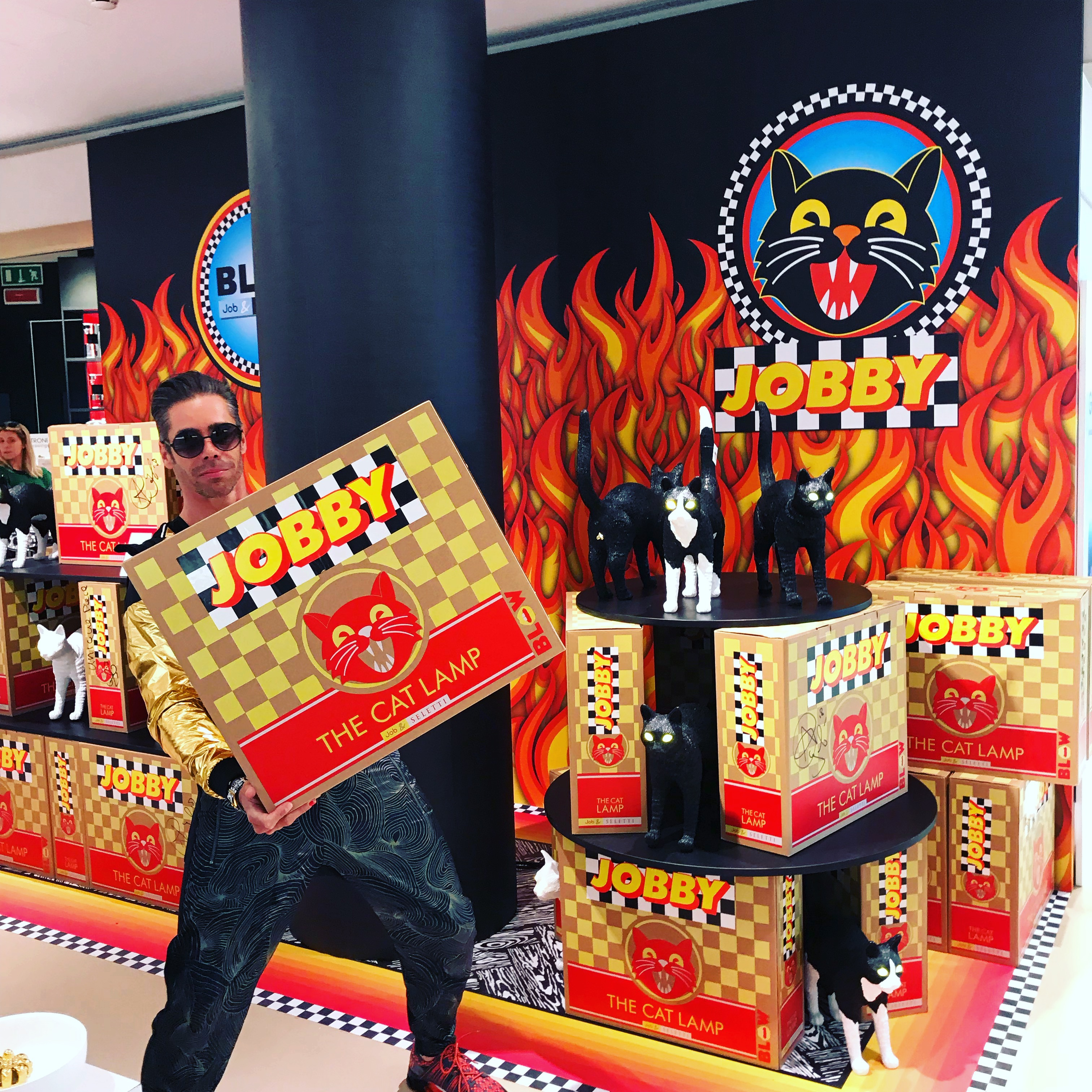
Job Smeets Jobby Launch

Studio Job's artwork ranges from unique bronze artwork in the Metropolitan Museum, New York, to a royal stamp featuring the Dutch King (forty million pieces produced) from the unique life-size bronze sculptures on Miami Beach for Faena, to the one-off Wunderkammer curiosity cabinet that Studio Job produced for Swarovski in Innsbruck.

Under the direction of Job Smeets with a studio in Milan, Italy and an atelier in Tilburg, Netherlands, Studio Job works across many areas including art, design, fashion, architecture, automotive and interior design having worked on projects including sculptures for Swarovski, Barneys, Viktor & Rolf and Land Rover, and product collections for brands such as Alessi, Moooi, Bisazza, Swatch, Gufram, and Disaronno. In 2017 Studio Job teamed up with Italian manufacturer Seletti to form the joint brand BLOW producing products in the pop spirit. Job Smeets has produced work for various galleries including Carpenters Workshop Gallery, Moss Gallery New York, Dilmos Milano, Fondazione Bisazza and Chamber New York where he curated and coordinated the gallery's launch collection and book.

Studio Job's collectable work is said to create a bridge between object and product by merging art and graphics.

He has completed four solo shows as an individual and over 82 solo shows as Studio Job including Groningen Museum 2003, 2006, 2007, 2011 & 2012,

He has also turned his attentions to the world of textiles, designing the patterns of luxury carpets.

== Writing ==
Job Smeets has written for various books and magazines. In 2011 he wrote a regular column in the Financial Times UK and a monthly column in design magazine WOTH, Netherlands in 2016. He has also written six additional books including Monkey Business and Book of Job. He regularly lectures internationally on art and design including V&A Museum in 2015 and Cooper Union, New York in 2010.

== Personal life ==
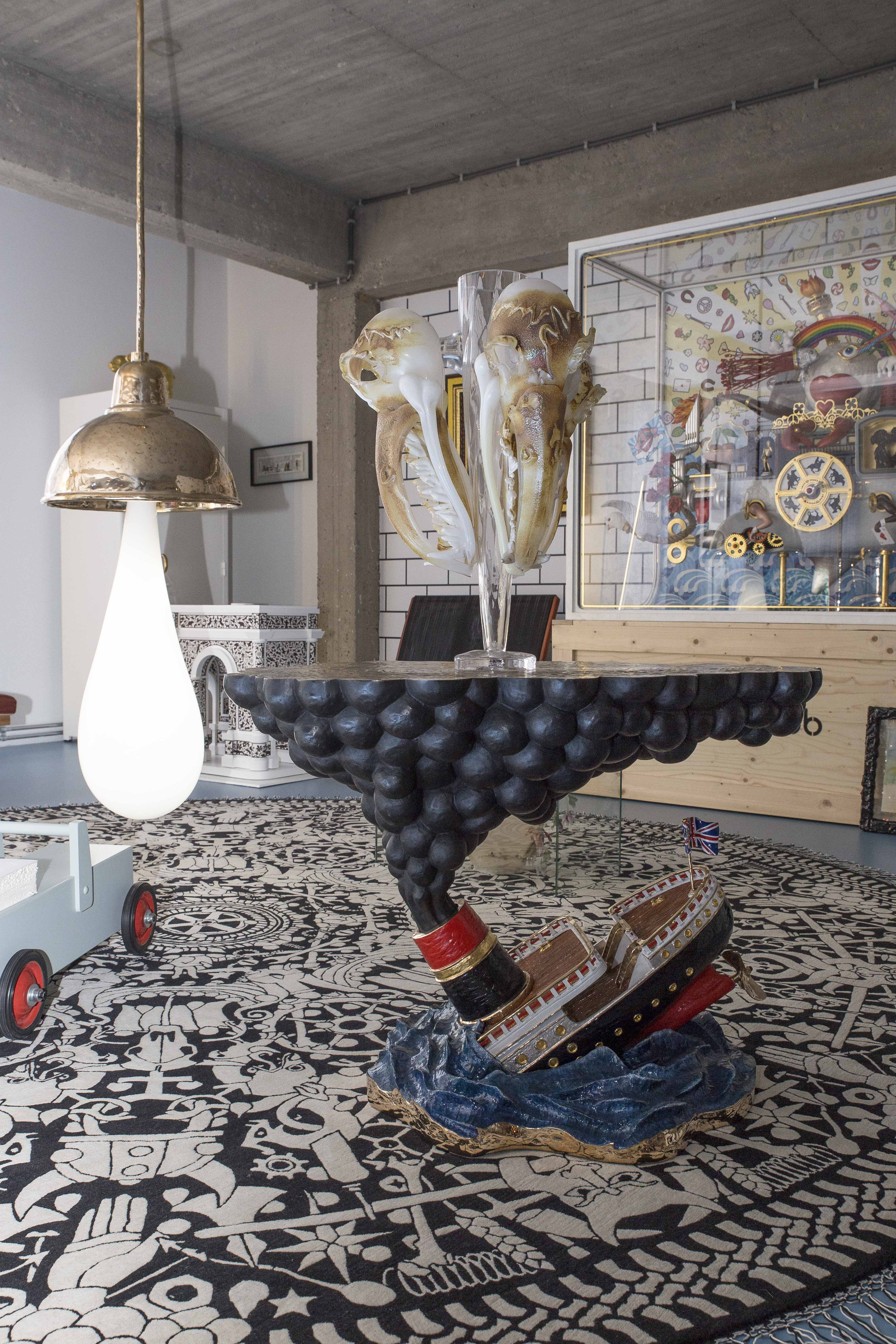
Living room of the Studio Job Headquarters, 2018

Job Smeets currently resides in Milan, Italy with his partner Rebecca Sharkey. They had their first child Elvis together in May, 2020, and second child Ziggy in 2021. He split from his graphic designer partner Nynke Tynagel in 2015. They marked the occasion of their split with a bronze art piece: the Train Crash table.
