= Wu Fan =

Wu Fan (Simplified Chinese: 吴凡; Hanyu Pinyin: Wú Fán) (December 1923 – 6 December 2015) was a Chinese artist from Chongqing in Sichuan province. He studied guohua with Pan Tianshou and Li Keran and oil painting with Ni Yide. He is most famous as a woodblock print artist. His most famous work 'Dandelion' (1959) demonstrates his mastery of the shuiyin printing style and won gold prize at the Leipzig International Print Competition.
