= Pietro Derossi =

Italian architect (1933–2025)

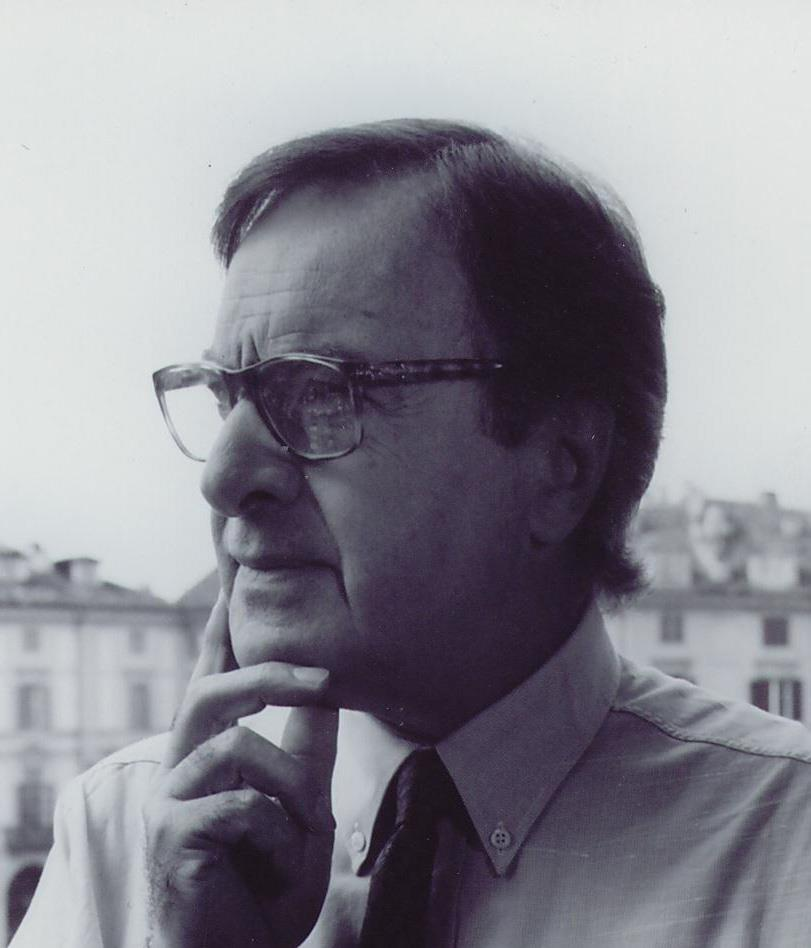
- Born: 3 August 1933; Turin, Italy
- Died: 5 September 2025 (aged 92); Turin, Italy
- Occupation: Architect

Pietro Derossi (3 August 1933 – 5 September 2025) was an Italian architect.

== Life and career ==
Born in Turin on 3 August 1933, he graduated from the Faculty of Architecture at the Polytechnic University of Turin. He was a full professor of architectural design at the Faculty of Architecture at the Polytechnic University of Milan. He was a visiting professor at the Architectural Association School of Architecture in London, an adjunct professor at the Pratt Institute and Columbia University in New York, and at the Faculty of Architecture at the École Polytechnique Fédérale de Lausanne, a visiting professor at the Berlin University of the Arts, and a scientific director of the 14th Milan Triennial. He was a member of the Accademia di San Luca in 1998.

In 1994, he founded the Derossi Associati studio with Paolo and Davide Derossi, which worked on numerous projects including the Conservation and Restoration Center at the Royal Palace of Venaria, the Museum and Sports Palace in Vercelli, and the Olympic Village for the 2006 Winter Olympics in Turin.

Derossi created some objects which are part of the design collections of museums, such as the Pratone and the Torneraj seat (with Giorgio Ceretti and Riccardo Rosso) and Wimbledon (with Ceretti). Torneraj and Pratone are also part of the MoMA collection.

Derossi died at his house in Turin on 5 September 2025, at the age of 92.
