= Mailiao =

Rural township in Yunlin, Taiwan

Coordinates: 23°45′N 120°15′E

Mailiao Township 麥寮鄕
- Rural township
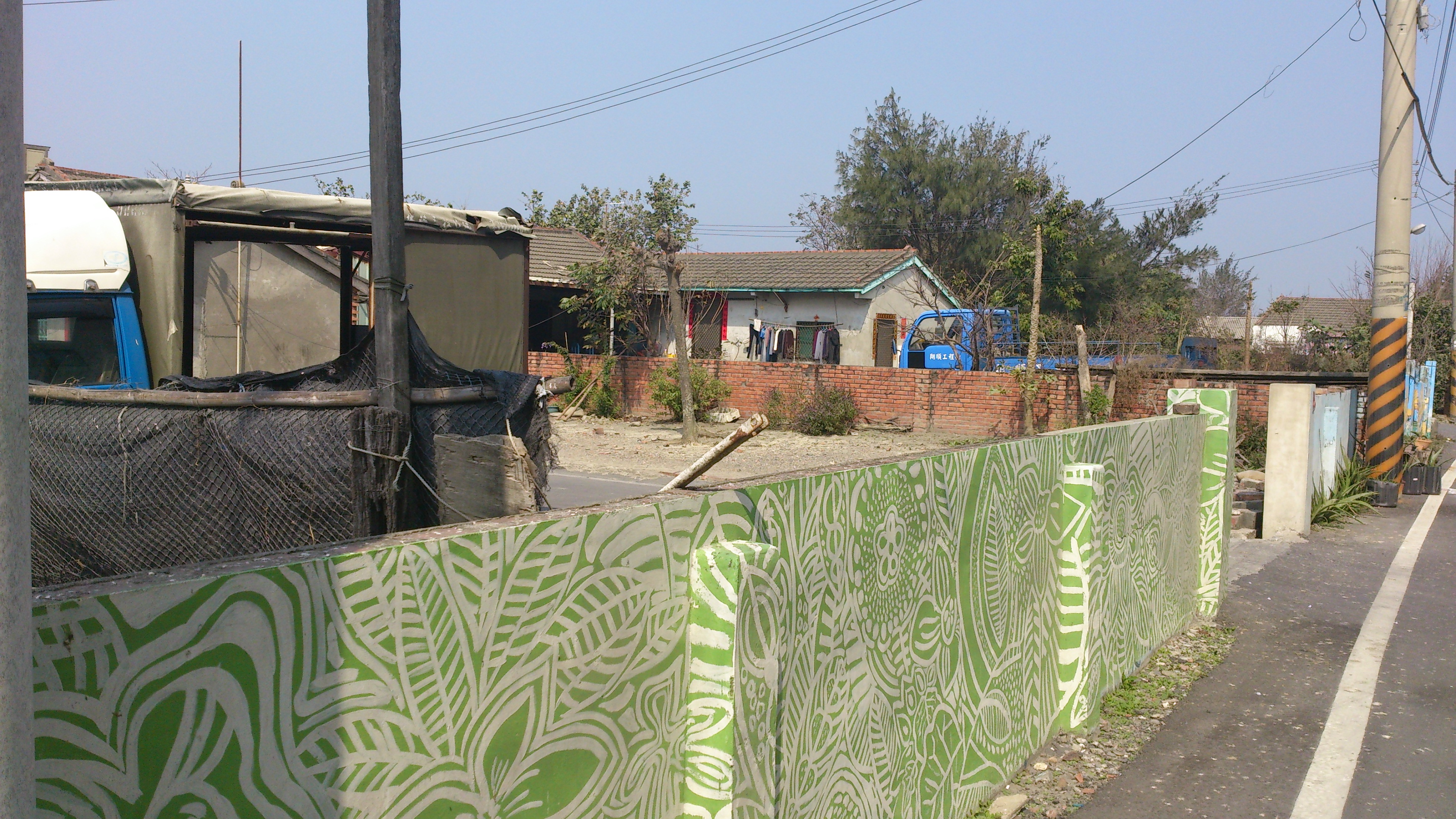

- Mailiao Township in Yunlin County
- Location: Yunlin County, Taiwan

Area
  - Total: 80 km^{2} (31 sq mi)

Population (February 2023)
  - Total: 49,298
  - Density: 620/km^{2} (1,600/sq mi)

Mailiao Township (Chinese: 麥寮鄕; pinyin: Màiliáo Xiāng; Pe̍h-ōe-jī: Be̍h-liâu Hiong) is a rural township in northwestern Yunlin County, Taiwan.

== Geography ==
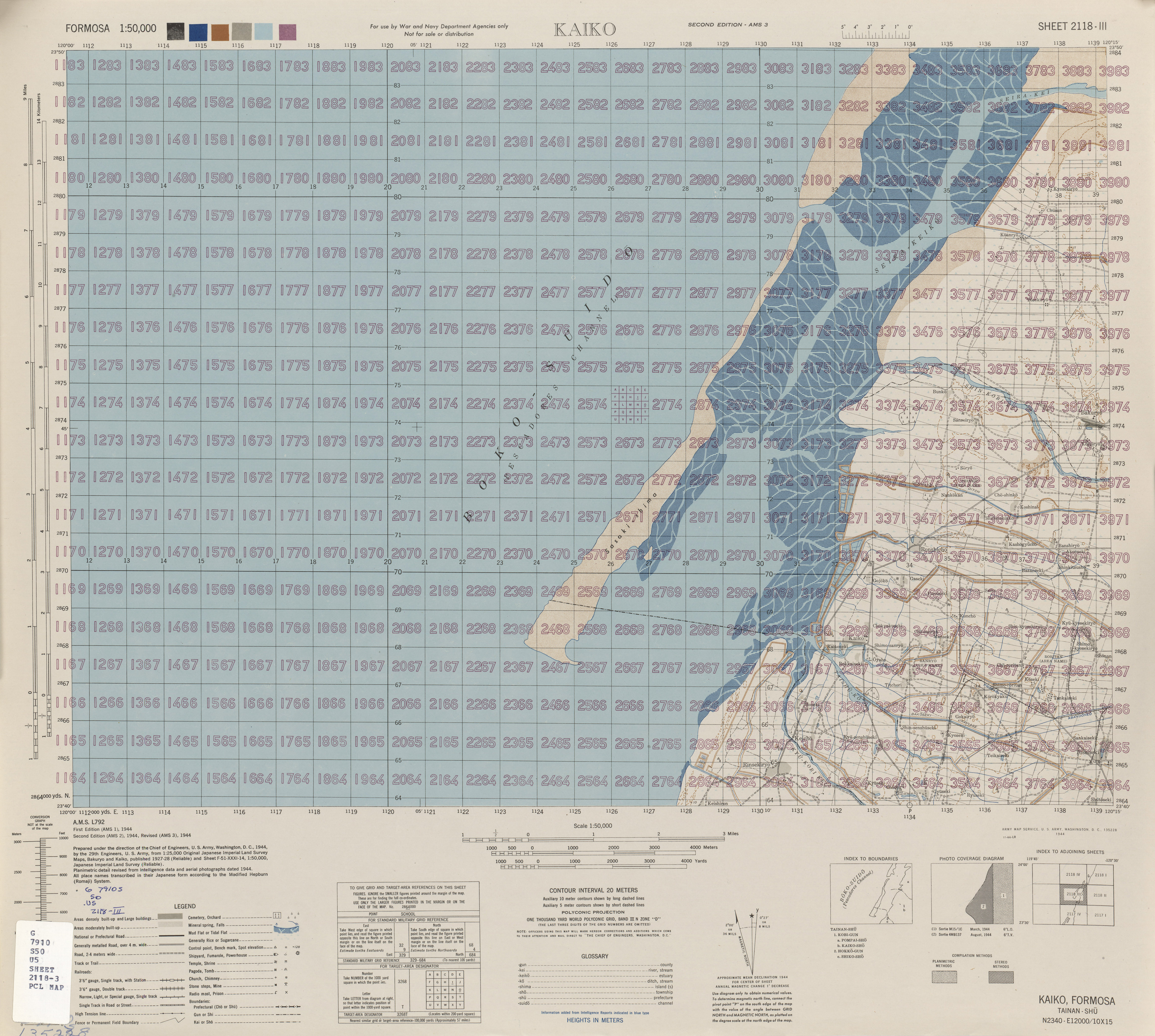
Map of the coastal area of Mailiao (1944)

With a population of 49,298 people as of February 2023, Mailiao has an area of 80.1668 km^{2}.

== Administrative divisions ==
Maifong, Maijin, Wayao, Xinghua, Haifeng, Houan, Zhongxing, Sancheng, Lunhou, Qiaotou, Xinji, Shicuo and Leicuo Village.

== Economy ==
The township's chief industry is the Formosa Mailiao Refinery, an oil refinery that processes 400,000 barrels (64,000 m^{3}) of crude oil per day. The refinery exports it goods via the township's harbor.

== Infrastructure ==
- Mailiao Power Plant
- Mailiao Refinery

== Tourist attractions ==
- Gongfan Temple
- Yong'an Temple

== Notable natives ==
- Hsu Li-ming, acting Mayor of Kaohsiung (2018)
