= C. C. Wang =

Artist and art collector (1907–2003)

Chi-Chien Wang (Chinese: 王己千; pinyin: Wáng Jǐqiān; Wade–Giles: Wang Chi-chien; 1907 – July 3, 2003), better known as C. C. Wang, was a Chinese-born artist and art collector based in New York City.

== Life ==
Wang was born in Suzhou, China in 1907. He studied law in Shanghai, and then in 1936 decided to devote himself to art. In 1949, to escape the exigencies of the Chinese Communist Revolution, he emigrated to the United States with his wife and two youngest daughters, leaving his son and oldest daughter behind.

== Collection ==
His collection of ancient Chinese paintings is consistently listed as one of the greatest collections in the world. In 1998, 25 paintings from his collection were given to the Metropolitan Museum of Art. One of the most important work in this group was the hanging scroll Riverbank by 10th century master Dong Yuan, whose authenticity, however, was controversially challenged by the art historian James Cahill.

== Art ==
Examples of his own paintings are the last authentic examples of "literati art" from China. Several expatriates practiced the style after the Chinese Communist Revolution, but he was the last to die of those who practiced it, and the style was not permitted immediately after the revolution. Subsequent generations had no one to pass the style onto, and so it died out with the few expatriates practicing abroad, like Wang.

== Death ==
Wang died on July 3, 2003, in New York City.

== References and further reading ==
- Hearn, Maxwell K.; Fong, Wen (1999). Along the Riverbank: Chinese Painting from the C.C. Wang Family Collection. New York: Metropolitan Museum of Art : Distributed by Abrams. ISBN 0870999052.
- On C. C. Wang's purchase of the Contag collection, see Cahill's note at: http://jamescahill.info/the-writings-of-james-cahill/responses-a-reminiscences/154-32what-became-of-the-contag-collection
- Notes made by James Cahill on forgeries/copies of works in various private (including C. C. Wang's) and museum collections: http://jamescahill.info/File/LS_lecture_notes/Addendum%20B.pdf
- A detailed biography of C. C. Wang can be found at: http://www.echinaart.com/Advisor/adv_ccwang_gallery.htm
