= Concrete barrier =

Concrete barrier may refer to:

- Alaska Barrier
- Bremer barrier
- Traffic barrier

- Concrete step barrier
- Constant-slope barrier
- F-Shape barrier
- Jersey barrier
