= Road collision types =

Overview of the various types of road traffic collision

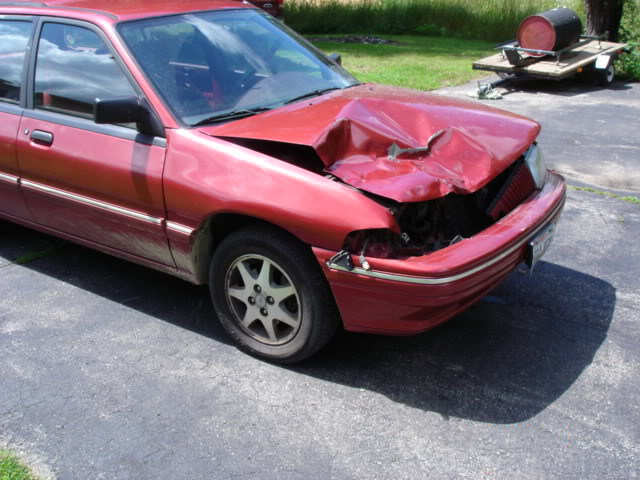
A Mercury Tracer that was damaged by colliding with a white-tailed deer in Wisconsin

Road traffic collisions generally fall into one of five common types:

- Lane departure crashes, which occur when a driver leaves the lane they are in and collides with another vehicle or a roadside object. These include head-on collisions and roadway departure collisions.
- Collisions at junctions, including rear-end collision and angle or side impacts
- Collisions involving pedestrians and cyclists
- Collisions with animals
- Collisions with buildings

Other types of collision may occur. Rollovers are not very common, but lead to greater rates of severe injury and death. Some of these are secondary events that occur after a collision with a roadway departure crash or a collision with another vehicle.

If several vehicles are involved, the term 'serial crash' may be used. If many vehicles are involved, the term 'major incident' may be used rather than 'pile up'.

== Crash typology by country ==
In some countries, crash type classification exists for statistical purpose so that a crash is counted in one type or another.

=== California ===
California classifies road collision by: Head-on, sideswipe, rear end, broadside, hit object, overturn, auto-pedestrian, other, not stated:

View source data.
View source data.
View source data.

=== France ===
French official statistics have 7 road collision types:

1. – Two vehicles – frontal
2. – Two vehicles – rear
3. – Two vehicles – side
4. – Three vehicles and more – in series
5. – Three vehicles and more – multiple collisions
6. – Other collision
7. – Without collision
View source data.
View source data.

== Head-on collisions ==
A head-on collision occurs when two vehicles travelling in opposite directions (more or less) collide frontally with each other. The typical cause of head-on collisions is when one vehicle inadvertently strays into the path of an oncoming vehicle. However, the root cause sometimes lies in a steering overcorrection after veering to the side of the road as opposed to the centre. Head-on collisions often have poor outcomes because of the speed involved when the collision takes place. In a head-on collision, the vehicle speeds are additive—the effective collision speed is the sum of the speeds of the two vehicles. This means that, for example, if two vehicles both moving at 45 MPH collide head-on, the effective crash speed is 90 MPH; if the weights of both vehicles are about the same, then the crash forces experienced by the occupants of both vehicles will be essentially equal to those forces that would be experienced if one of the vehicles were travelling at 90 MPH and the other vehicle was stopped (with its brakes released) when the collision occurred. (If one vehicle is heavier than the other, the crash physics are not symmetrical and the 90 MPH of total crash speed will be apportioned differently depending on the actual speed of each vehicle, as the kinetic energy of each vehicle depends on both its speed and its weight.)

=== Risk of head-on collisions ===
The likelihood of head-on collision is at its greatest on roads with narrow lanes, sharp curves, no separation of lanes of opposing traffic and high volumes of traffic. Crash severity, measured as risk of death and injury, and repair costs to vehicles, increases as speed increases.

Therefore, the roads with the greatest risk of head-on collision are busy single-carriageway roads outside urban areas where speeds are highest.

Contrast this with motorways, which rarely have a high risk of head-on collision in spite of the high speeds involved, because of the median separation treatments such as cable barriers, concrete step barriers, Jersey barriers, metal traffic barriers, and wide medians.

=== Countermeasures ===
The greatest risk reduction in terms of head-on collision comes through the separation of oncoming traffic, also known as median separation or median treatment, which can reduce road collisions in the order of 70%. Indeed, both Ireland and Sweden have undertaken large programmes of safety fencing on 2+1 roads.

Median barriers can be divided into three basic categories: rigid barrier systems, semi-rigid barrier systems, and flexible barrier systems. Rigid barrier systems are made up of concrete and are the most common barrier type in use today (e.g. Jersey barrier or concrete step barrier). They are the most costly to install, but have relatively low life-cycle costs, making them economically viable over time. The second barrier type, semi-rigid, is commonly known as guardrail or guiderail barriers. The initial installation of this type can reach as much as $100,000 per mile. These more forgiving barriers are meant to absorb the impact of a crash, and as a result, increase the cost of their life-cycle with each crash and each repair. The third median barrier type is the flexible barrier systems (e.g. cable barriers). Cable barriers are the most forgiving and the least expensive to install, but have high life-cycle costs due to repair needs after crashes. On the other hand, they have been shown to have calculated cost benefits calculating to as much as $420,000 per mile annually. Much cheaper collision reduction methods are to improve road markings, to reduce speeds and to separate traffic with wide central hatching.

Sealing of safety zones along the side of the road (also known as a hard shoulder) can also reduce the risk of head-on collisions caused by steering over-correction.

Where a hard shoulder cannot be provided, a "safety edge" can reduce the chances of steering overcorrection. An attachment is added to the paving machine to provide a beveled edge at 30 to 35-degree angle to horizontal, rather than the usual near-vertical edge. This works by reducing the steering angle needed for the tire to climb up the pavement edge. For a vertical edge, the steering angle needed to mount the pavement edge is sharp enough to cause loss of control once the vehicle is back on top of the pavement. If the driver cannot correct this in time, the vehicle may veer into oncoming traffic, or off the opposite side of the road.

== Collisions involving pedestrians ==
Pedestrian deaths are much more common in collisions in the European Union than in the US. In the European Union countries, more than 200,000 pedestrians and cyclists are injured annually.

Most pedestrians are killed by a frontal impact. In such a situation, a pedestrian is struck by a car front; for instance, the bumper touches either the leg or knee-joint area; then, the lower part of the body is accelerated forward, while the upper part of the body rotates and accelerates to the car; this will likely cause damage to pelvis and thorax. Then the head hits the windscreen with the velocity of the striking car. Finally, the victim falls to the ground.

=== Collisions involving pedestrians in the United States ===
From 2008 to 2017, pedestrian deaths resulting from vehicle collisions rose 35%, though areas with Vision Zero initiatives tended to buck this trend.

As of March 2004, the pedestrian traffic fatalities ratio was 11% of all traffic deaths in the US, according to the NHTSA's National Center for Statistics and Analysis. In the US, 14.5% of all deaths on the roads are pedestrians, while this ratio varies from 0.7% in North-Dakota to 45% in the District of Columbia, in 2013; this same year, 0.14 pedestrian per million inhabitant were killed in North-Dakota against 2.70 in Delaware.

In cities of over 500,000 inhabitants, the score varied from 6.10 pedestrian deaths per million inhabitants for Detroit (Michigan), to a safer score of 0.85 for Columbus, Ohio, in 2013.

Some well-known fatal collision conditions in the United States include vehicle speed, urban zone, intersection absence, and night, according to the NHTSA. According to the GHSA, in the US, 74% of pedestrian deaths occur at night time, and 72% of the deaths involve pedestrians not crossing at provided road crossing areas.

According to a law professor at the University of South Carolina, if a pedestrian or cyclist is killed in a collision and thereby prevented from providing evidence, there is a risk that they will be unfairly blamed for the collision. At the same time he says that what would lessen those fatalities would be not speeding, not drinking, not texting, and not being distracted.

In the US, in 2013, pedestrian fatalities were higher for the 40+ age group.

The US does not test vehicles for pedestrian safety, and the NHTSA dropped efforts to impose pedestrian safety standards on US automakers more than a decade ago.

Pedestrian fatality probability per crash by posted speed limit
Nota: 30 mph ~ 48 km/h; 40 mph ~ 64 km/h; 50 mph ~ 80 km/h;
Source: FARS 1997–2005 (Final), 2006 (ARF) and GES 1997-2006.

Nonetheless, for crosswalk safety, in the US there is not much clarity regarding the need for a crosswalk to be marked or unmarked due to advantages and disadvantages of both approaches, although each city might have its own rules.

=== Collisions involving pedestrians in European Union and Japan ===
In the European Union, 22% of all killed on the roads are pedestrians, while this ratio varies from 11% in the Netherlands to 39% in Latvia and Romania. UK is close to the EU mean with a 23% score. Of all those European pedestrian fatalities, 69% are killed inside urban areas.

In the European Union, 8% of all killed on the roads are cyclists, while this ratio varies from 2% in Greece to 24% in the Netherlands. UK is close to the EU mean with a 9% score. Of all European cyclist fatalities, 57% are killed inside urban areas.

In Europe, the majority of victims were children and elderly persons involving "low-speed" crashes in urban and residential areas.

In France, in 2014, 499 pedestrians were killed and 4,323 injured. 47% of pedestrians were killed by night (233 pedestrians). This rate was 32% in urban zones, 73% in rural zones (83 deaths by night), and 91% on motorways (40 deaths by night).

In Japan, the pedestrian fatality rate is 30% of all road related deaths.

== Single-vehicle collisions ==
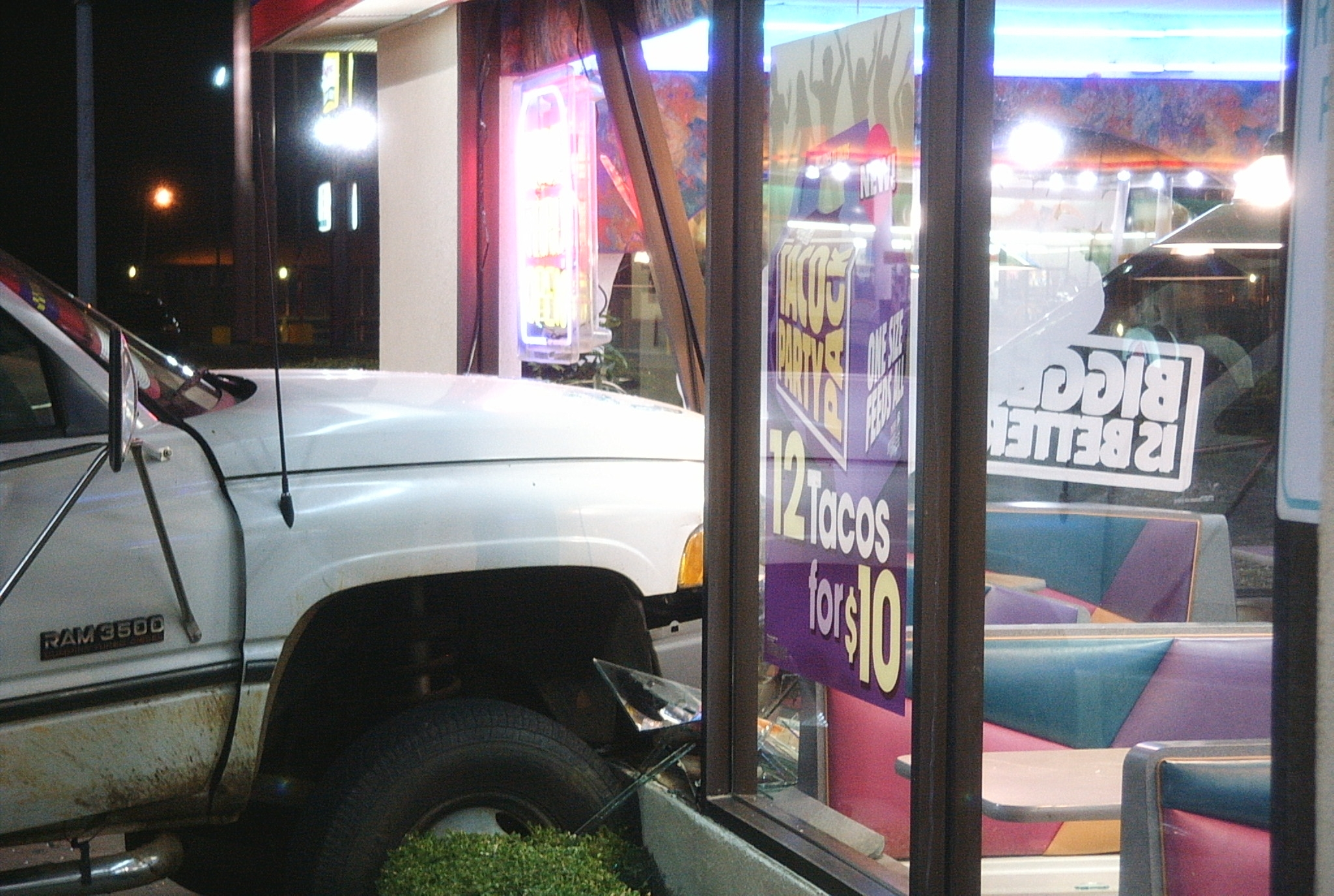
A Dodge Ram 3500 which has crashed into a restaurant

A single-vehicle collision occurs when a single road vehicle has a collision without involving any other vehicle.

They usually have similar root causes to head-on collisions, but no other vehicle happened to be in the path of the vehicle leaving its lane. Severe collisions of this type can happen on motorways, since speeds are extra high, increasing the severity.

Included in this category are roadway departure collisions, collisions with fallen rocks or debris in the road, rollover crashes within the roadway, and collisions with animals.

The normal inference is that the cause is operator error (although operator error is also the cause of most crashes). Common factors contributing to single-vehicle collisions include excessive speed, driver fatigue and driving under the influence of alcohol or other drugs. Environmental and roadway factors can also contribute to single-vehicle crashes. These include inclement weather, poor drainage, narrow lanes and shoulders, insufficient curve banking, and sharp curves. Some vehicles have unpredictable car handling characteristics or defects, which can increase the potential for a single-vehicle collision.

Suicide is also sometimes cited as a possible cause of single-vehicle collisions, although this is difficult to determine.

== Intersection collisions ==
Crashes at intersections (road junctions) are a very common type of road collision types. Collisions may involve head-on impact when one vehicle crosses an opposing lane of traffic to turn at an intersection, or side impacts when one vehicle crosses the path of an adjoining vehicle at an intersection.

=== Risk of intersection collisions ===
The risk of intersection collisions differs on rural and urban roads, with around 50% of urban crashes and 30% of rural crashes occurring at junctions. In urban areas the likelihood of an intersection collision occurring is high as they typically have a higher density of junctions. On rural roads while the likelihood of a collision may be lower (because of fewer intersections), but the outcome of the collision is often significantly worse because of the increased speeds involved. According to crash reporting data from NHTSA’s Fatality Analysis Reporting System, 71% of fatal crashes at intersections were in non-city, rural areas due largely to increased speed.

Because intersection collisions often result in side-impacts, they are therefore often fatal because people are seated close to the part of the car that provides little protection.

=== Vehicle-into-building crashes ===
The Storefront Safety Council maintains a database of crashes in which drivers collided with buildings, and estimates about sixty vehicle-in-building crashes per day in the US, leading to about 500 fatalities per year. Another study in cooperation with researchers at Texas A&M University estimated that gas and convenience stores see about twenty vehicle-into-building crashes per day.

=== Countermeasures ===
Although expensive to implement, roundabouts are an effective way of reducing the speed of traffic at intersections and dramatically reducing the likelihood of high speed right-angle collisions. Clear road markings and signing are low-cost methods of improving safety at intersections.

== See also ==
- Multiple-vehicle collision
- Road traffic safety
- Turning Point (documentary)
