= Cable barrier =

Roadside safety barrier

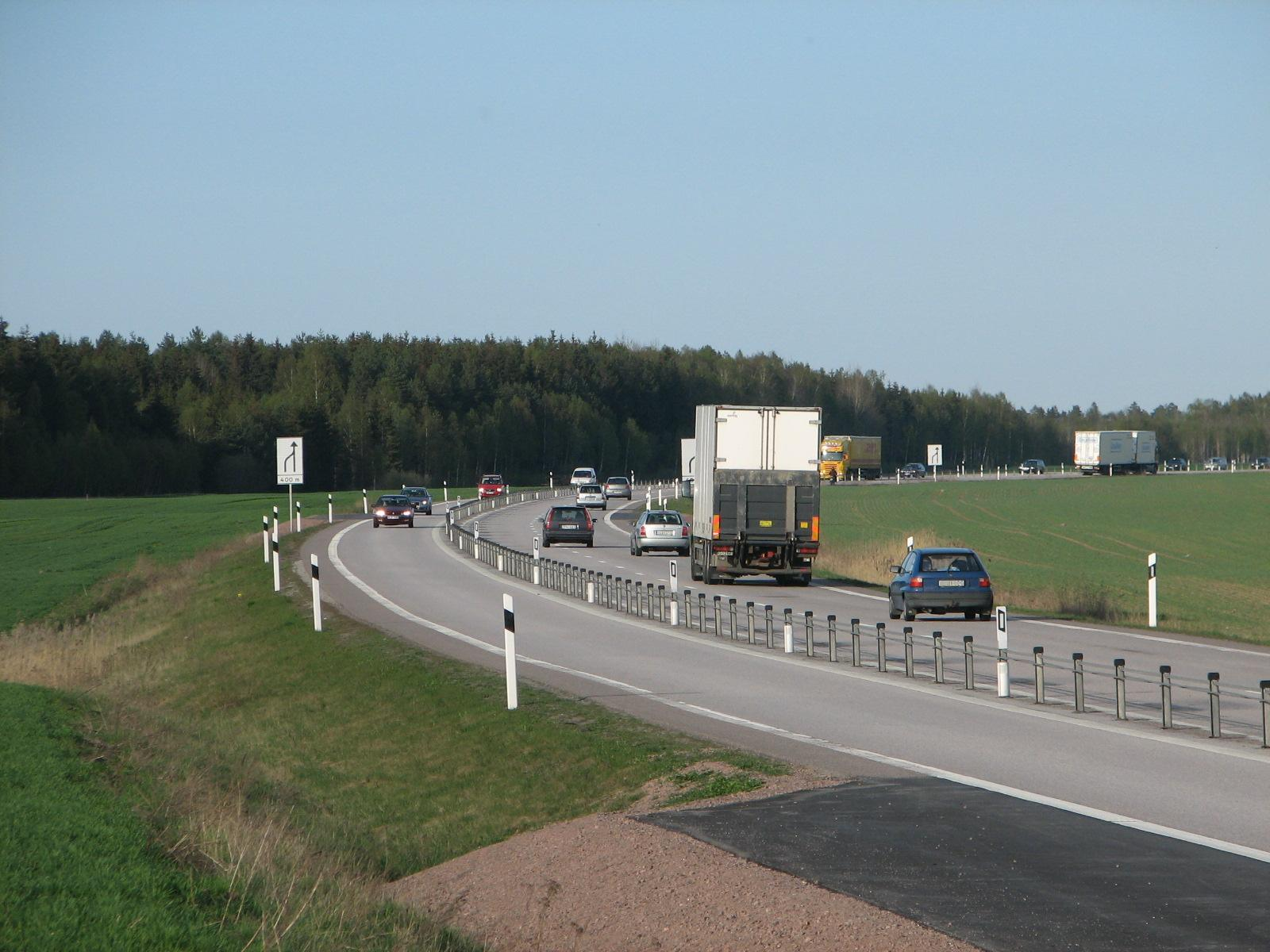
A cable barrier separating lanes on a 2+1 road in Sweden

A cable barrier, sometimes referred to as guard cable or wire rope safety barrier (WRSB), is a type of roadside or median safety traffic barrier/guard rail. It consists of steel wire ropes mounted on weak posts. As is the case with any roadside barrier, its primary purpose is to prevent a vehicle from leaving the traveled way and striking a fixed object or terrain feature that is less forgiving than itself. Also similar to most roadside barriers, cable barriers function by capturing and/or redirecting the errant vehicle.

Because these barriers are relatively inexpensive, as opposed to concrete step barriers to install and maintain, and are very effective at capturing vehicles, their use is becoming increasingly prevalent worldwide. By far, the most popular use of the cable barrier system occurs in the medians of divided highways.

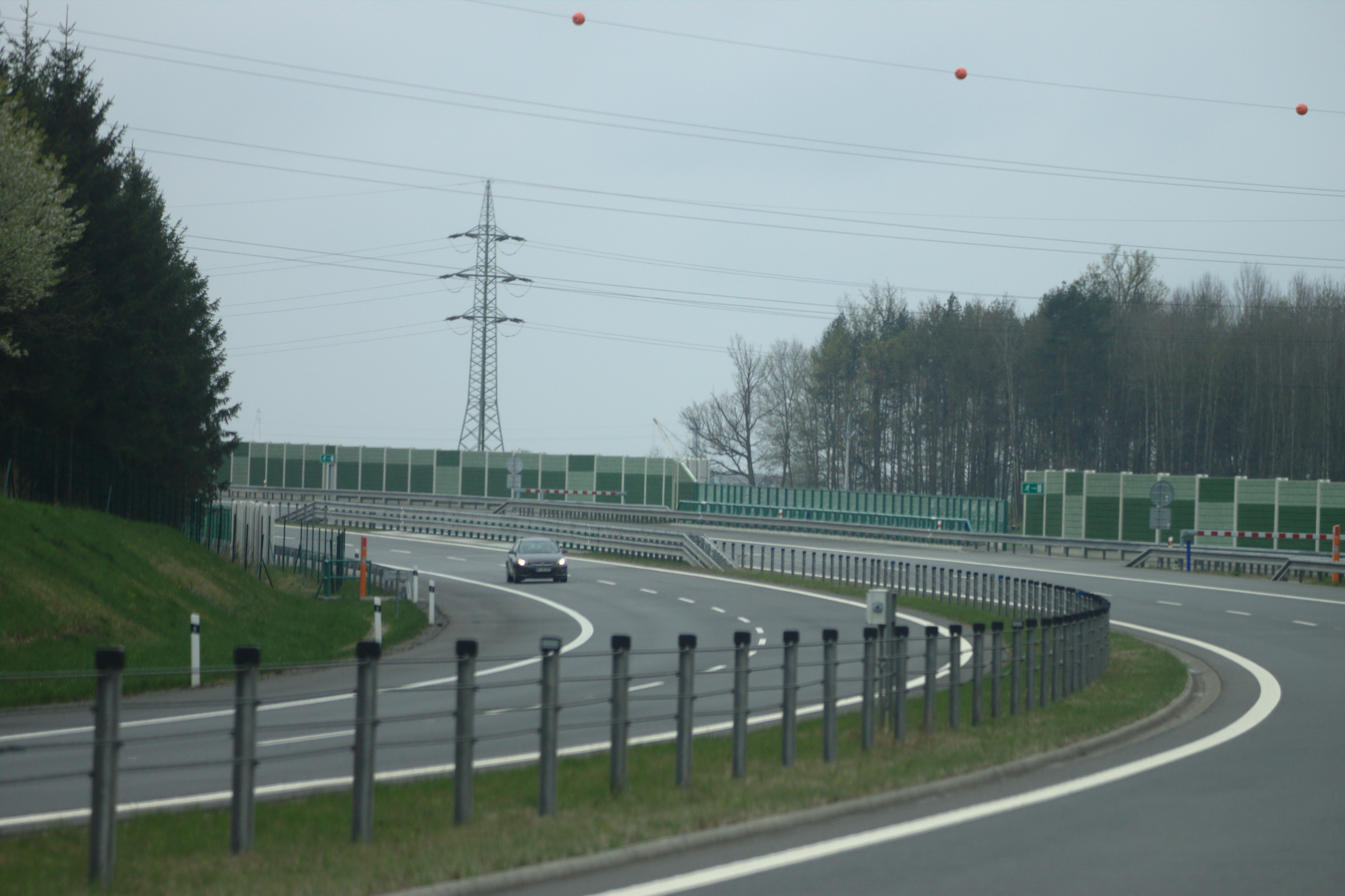
A cable barrier in the Czech Republic

Given the opposing directions of traffic on divided highways, cross median crashes are particularly severe. While median width plays a large role in the occurrence of these crashes, increased width alone does not eliminate them and quite often, the median must be shielded with a barrier. Cable barriers provide a cost-effective solution to the shielding issue.

The system is more forgiving than traditional concrete (Jersey) barriers or steel barriers used today and remains effective when installed on sloping terrain. The flexibility of the system absorbs impact energy and dissipates it laterally, which reduces the forces transmitted to the vehicle occupants.

Although cable barriers have been used since the 1920s, and a media barriers since the 1960s, it was not until the mid-1990s that many departments of transportation began to deploy them with any regularity.

In many countries of the European Union these cable barriers are not allowed to be used along highways as they are perceived to be especially hazardous for motorcyclists. However, a study of motorcyclist injury rates for several types of highway barrier did not find an appreciable difference in fatal and severe injuries between cable and W-beam barriers. Both were significantly more hazardous than concrete barriers but less hazardous than none.

== Types ==
There are two types of cable barrier systems in use today, low-tension and high-tension. Each system has its advantages and disadvantages, but in general, a high-tension system has a higher initial cost with lower long-term maintenance costs and concerns.

=== Low-tension ===
During the expansion of cable barrier use throughout the 1980s and 1990s, the low-tension system was specified almost exclusively. This system is also called the “generic” system, referring to the fact that it is not exclusively manufactured by any single producer.

Low tension simply means the cables themselves are tensed only enough to eliminate sag between posts. Large springs at both ends of the cable run are compressed (according to temperature) to maintain the tension in the system.

When a vehicle impacts the low-tension system under normal conditions, the cable moves as much as 12 ft (3.7 metres) from its original location. This movement is known as the dynamic deflection. Given the lack of tension in the system, individual installations, or “runs”, of cable are limited to 2,000 ft (600 metres) with an anchor assembly at each end.

Due to the low tension of the system, the cables tend to lie on the ground in the event that an impact damages multiple posts. As such, there is no residual safety value within the undamaged remainder of the 2,000 ft (600 metres) installation and that entire section of barrier will remain nonfunctional until repaired.

Despite these perceived shortcomings, low-tension cable barrier, until recently, was arguably the workhorse of the industry. Thousands of miles of the generic system remain in use today in countries worldwide.

=== High-tension ===
Available High-Tension Cable Barriers
System	Manufacturer
ArmorWire	Armorflex International
Brifen	Brifen USA
CASS	Trinity Industries, Inc.
Gibraltar	Gibraltar
Safence	Blue Systems, AB
NU-CABLE	Nucor Steel Marion, Inc.

In appearance, high-tension cable is very similar to low-tension. In most other aspects, the two systems are very different.

High-tension cable consists of three or four pre-stretched cables supported by weak posts. Currently, all high-tension systems are proprietary, that is, marketed under exclusive right of a specific manufacturer.

During installation, the cables are placed on the posts, and then tightened to a specific tension according to temperature. The tensions values range between approximately 2,000 and 9,000lb (9,000 to 40,000 newtons). Due to this tightening, the cable installations can be of indefinite length. In fact, the lengths of the runs are usually only limited by the presence of obstacles such as median openings or bridge columns.

When a vehicle impacts the high-tension system under normal conditions, the cable deflects as little as 8 ft (2.4 metres) from its original location. The inherent tension within the system also allows the cables to remain strung, even after an impact that removes several posts, thus allowing the remainder of the run to function normally.

== Performance limits ==
=== Safety testing ===
A roadside safety hardware feature must undergo rigorous safety testing before it can be used on the National Highway System (NHS) in the United States. Most states have adopted the same testing criteria for highways that are not on the NHS. The standard by which all roadside safety features are measured is contained within the National Cooperative Highway Research Program Report No. 350 (NCHRP 350). NCHRP 350 evaluates safety hardware according to three general factors:

Structural Adequacy

The system must contain and redirect the vehicle with no underriding, overriding, or penetration.

Occupant Risk

Fragments of the system cannot penetrate the passenger compartment, the vehicle must remain upright during and after the collision, and the passenger must not undergo excessive impact or deceleration.

Vehicle Trajectory

After the impact, the vehicle should not intrude into adjacent traffic lanes nor should it exit the system at an angle greater than 60% of the entry angle.

=== Test levels ===
Within NCHRP 350 there are six separate test levels (TL) representing different vehicles, impact angles, and speeds. Test level three (TL-3) is probably the most common as it establishes safety criteria for both small cars and pickups at 60 miles per hour (97 km/h). This category of traffic accounts for the majority of all vehicle traffic in the United States.

At TL-3, an 1,800 pounds (820 kg) car is crashed at 60 miles per hour (97 km/h) on an impact angle of 20°. Also at this level, a 4,400 pounds (2,000 kg) pickup truck impacts at 60 miles per hour (97 km/h) and 25°. TL-4 includes both these tests but adds a 17,600 pounds (8,000 kg) single-unit truck impacting at 50 miles per hour (80 km/h) and 25°.

All cable barrier systems available today are approved at either TL-3 or TL-4. There is a great deal of anecdotal evidence, however, that many of these systems are performing at a higher level in the field capturing vehicles as large as semi truck-trailer combinations.

== Environmental limits ==
=== Slopes ===
Cable barrier, is intended for use on slopes with a 1:6 vertical to horizontal ratio. The 1V:6H requirement is based in both computer modeling and full-scale crash testing and represents sound theory. In practice, however, slopes as flat as 1V:6H are often the exception.

In these cases, there are three TL-4 systems available that function as TL-3 on slopes as steep as 1V:4H.

=== Clearance ===
Rigid barriers such as concrete and semi-rigid barriers such as steel guardrail, exhibit impact deflections of 0 to 4 ft (1.2 metres), respectively. Flexible systems such as cable barriers deflect between 8 and 12 ft (2.4 and 3.7 metres) upon impact. Given these relatively large deflections, cable barrier systems are not usually considered appropriate to shield fixed objects closer than 8 ft (2.4 metres) offset of the travelled way. Even when the available clearance exceeds 8 ft (2.4 metres), the public seems to have a greater level of confidence in a more robust barrier.

== Defective installation and accidents ==
Median Cable Barriers have been studied for safety, and they are arguably effective deterrents to serious highway accidents. However, a lack of proper installation and testing has led to severe collisions and even death. In places, such as Arizona, there is indication that the state government agency in charge of highway regulation failed to follow proper installation procedures. Apparently there are internal government documents which show that the Arizona Department of Transportation was aware of cable barrier problems, and they may have also rushed installation of these barriers on state highways.

A major problem alleged, that reduces the effectiveness of cable barriers, is the installation below grade, especially around slopes or dips. Without any compensation for a slope in the median, a car can actually jump the top of a barrier, and therefore be exposed to a potential cross-over collision. Litigation has arisen in Arizona regarding the improper installation of cable barriers. One wrongful death suit resulted in a one million dollar settlement with the state. In Washington state, numerous letters were submitted to the state Department of Transportation complaining of cable barrier installation.

== Common specifications ==
	Tension (Low/High)	Containment/Deflection	No. of ropes (1/2/3/4)	Standards - TL3/TL4/other	Symmetrical/Non-Symmetrical
example 1	High	Deflection	4	other	Symmetrical
example 2	High	Containment	4	TL4	Symmetrical

== Common characteristics ==
Tension – High tensioned WRSB are generally tensioned to app. 2.5t during installation (subject to weather conditions, type of WRSB, and other factors). Low tensioned WRSB are not as common as they used to be, the tension is generally very low and close to 0.

Containment or Deflection – based WRSB. Deflection aimed WRSB could be tensioned to slightly higher tension and will most probably use 4 wires (ropes). The overall length of the barrier tends to be shorter. Containment based WRSB will have wire ropes spread further apart from each other (approximately 150mm - 60mm), to increase the catchment area.

== See also ==
- Barrier transfer machine
- Bremer wall
- Concrete step barrier
- Constant-slope barrier
- F-shape barrier
- Impact attenuator
- Jersey barrier
- Median strip
- Traffic barrier
- Traffic bollard
