= Revetment (aircraft) =

Parking space for aircraft, separated by blast walls

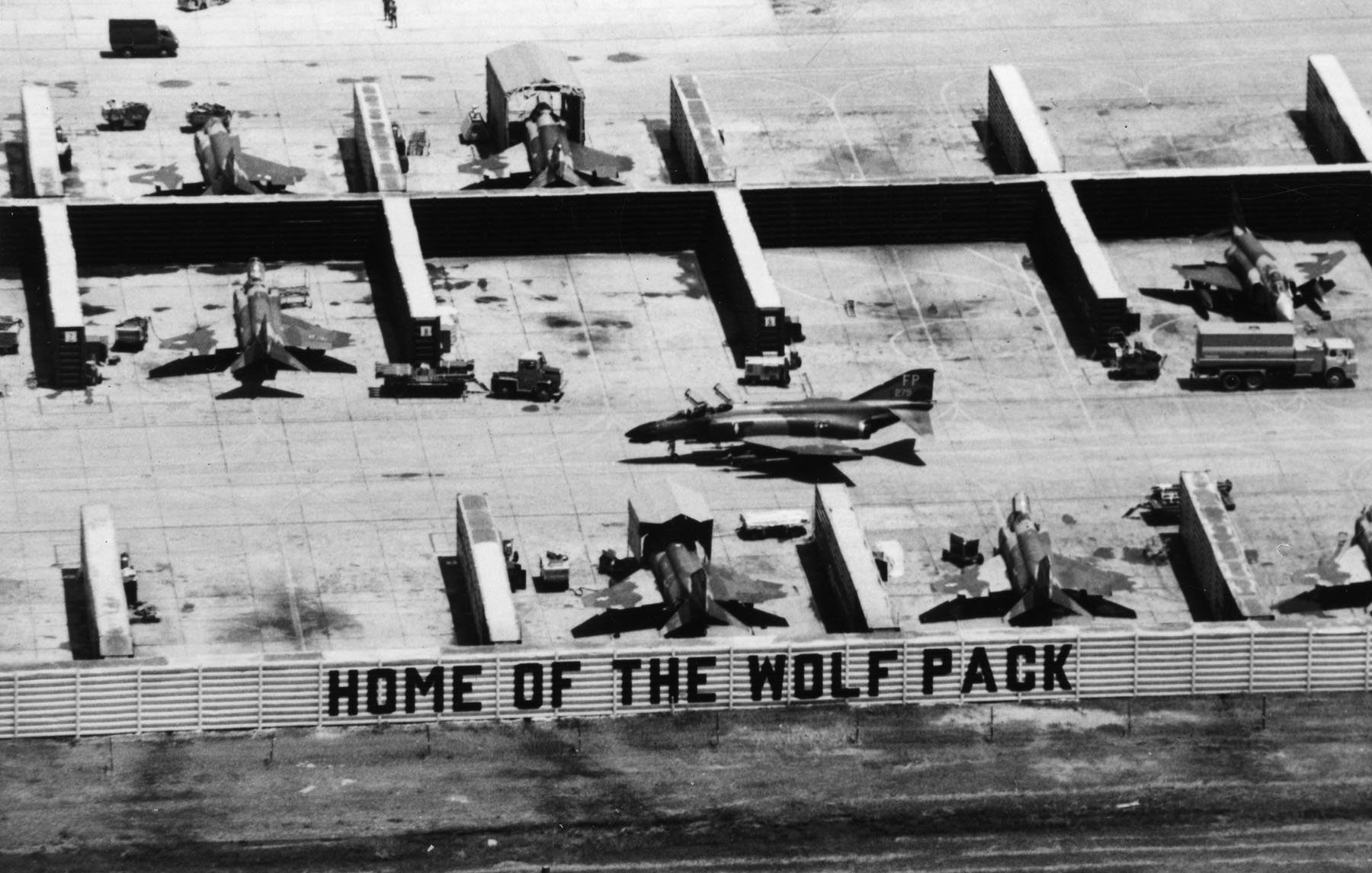
USAF F-4D Phantom II fighters in their revetments at Ubon Royal Thai Air Force Base, Thailand, c. 1967

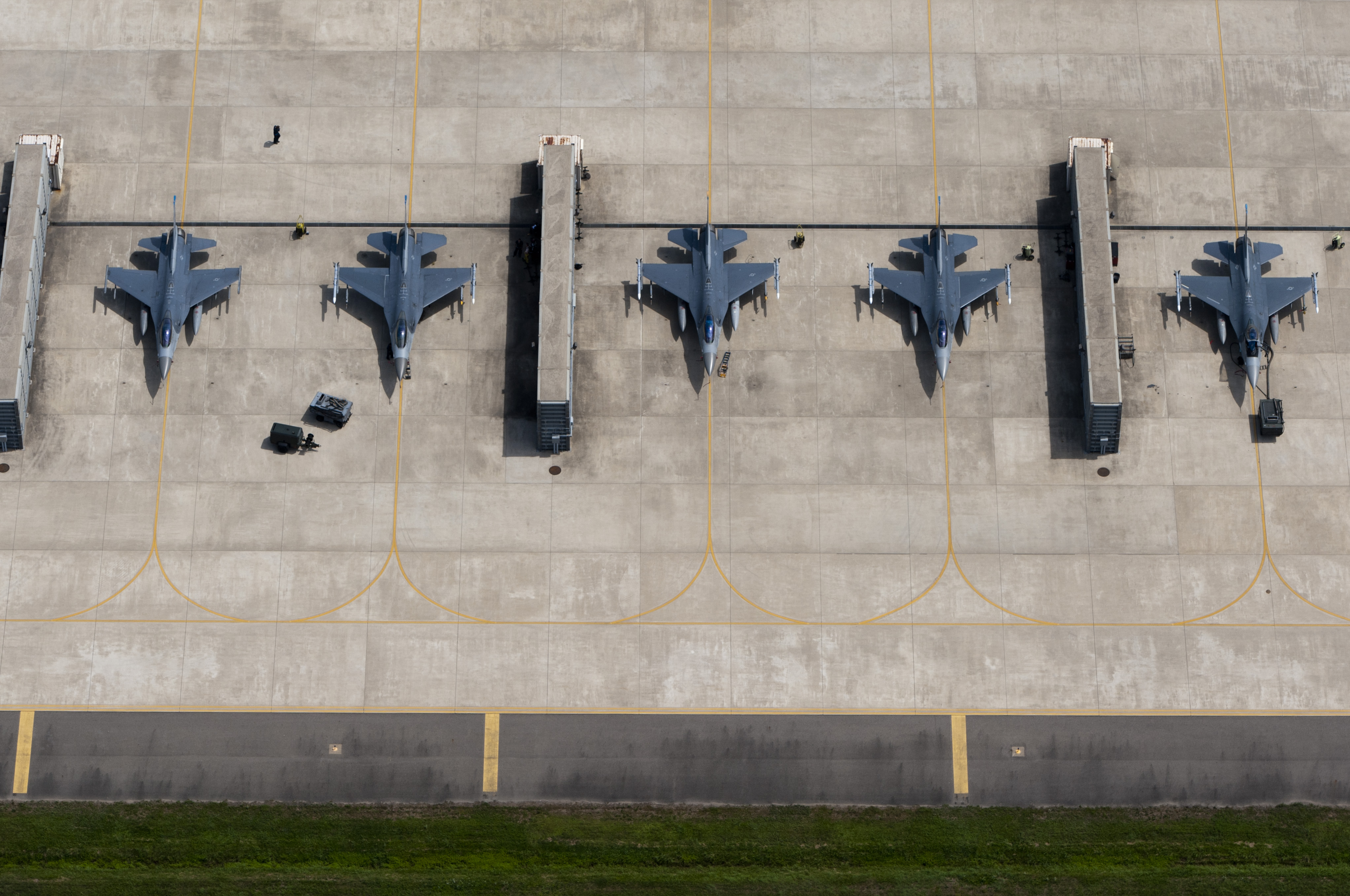
F-16 Fighting Falcon fighters in their revetments at Kunsan Air Base, South Korea, 2013

A revetment, in military aviation, is a parking area for one or more aircraft that is surrounded by blast walls on three sides. These walls are as much about protecting neighbouring aircraft as it is to protect the aircraft within the revetment; if a combat aircraft loaded with fuel and munitions were to ignite, a chain reaction might lead to the destruction of its neighbours. The blast walls around a revetment are designed to channel any blast and damage upwards and outwards, away from neighbouring aircraft.

== Blast pen ==
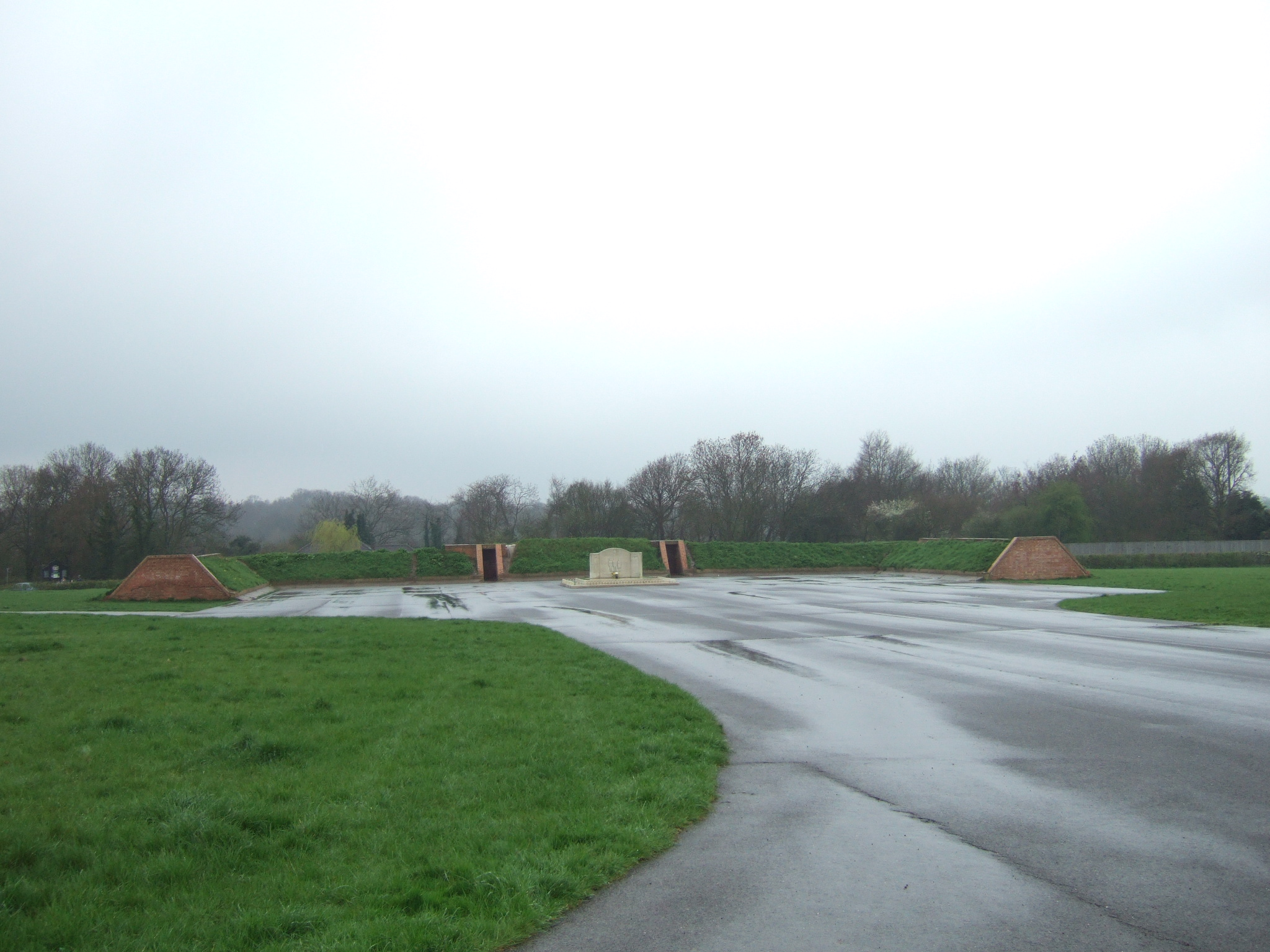
A blast pen and memorial at the former RAF Kenley

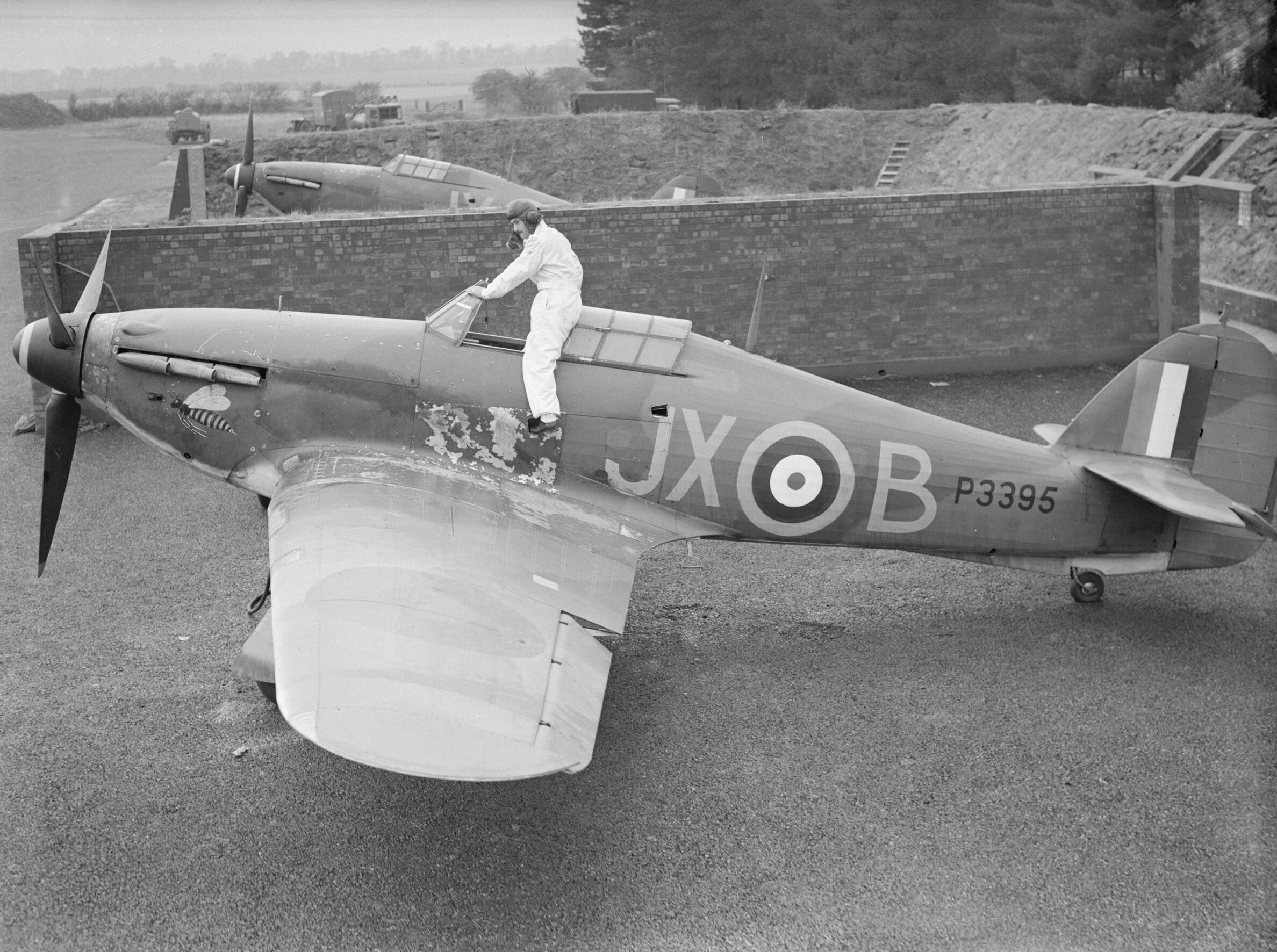
A Hawker Hurricane in a revetment at RAF Wittering in 1940

A blast pen was a specially constructed E-shaped double bay at British Royal Air Force (RAF) Second World War fighter stations, being either 150 ft (46 m) or 190 ft (58 m) wide and 80 ft (24 m) front-to-back, accommodating aircraft for safe-keeping against bomb blasts and shrapnel during air-attacks.

Although the pens were open to the sky, the projecting sidewalls preserved the aircraft from all lateral damage, with 12 in (300 mm) thick, 9 ft (2.7 m)-high concrete centres and banked-up earth on either side, forming a roughly triangular section 18 ft (5.5 m) wide at their base. The longer spine section behind the parking areas usually encloses a narrow corridor for aircrew and servicing personnel to employ as an air raid shelter.

Examples may seen at the present Kenley Aerodrome and at North Weald Airfield, although some pens have had their second bay removed, becoming U-shaped rather than E-shaped. There are also a large number at the former RAF Catterick, and some at RAF Wittering. The Imperial War Museum Duxford has one that is open to the public. While common on Fighter Command airfields, other RAF Stations such as RAF Benson and RAF Brize Norton did not have blast pens.

== Gallery ==
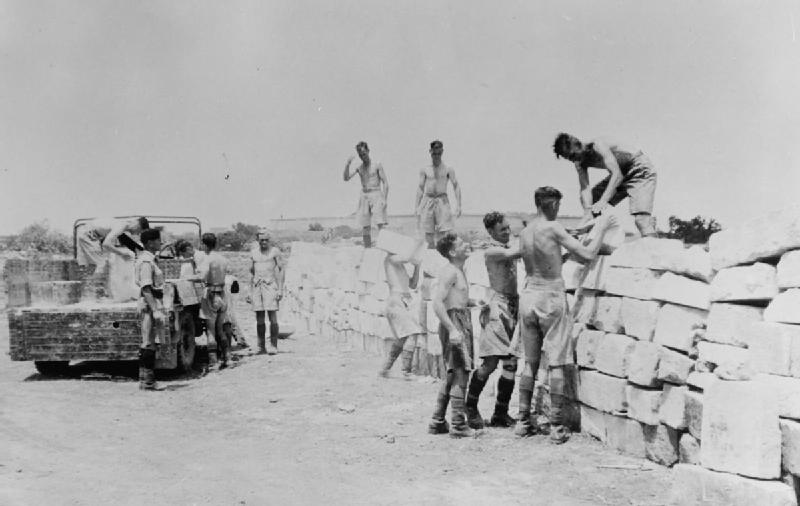
Soldiers construct aircraft revetments at RAF Ta Kali, Malta, using locally quarried limestone blocks, c. 1942

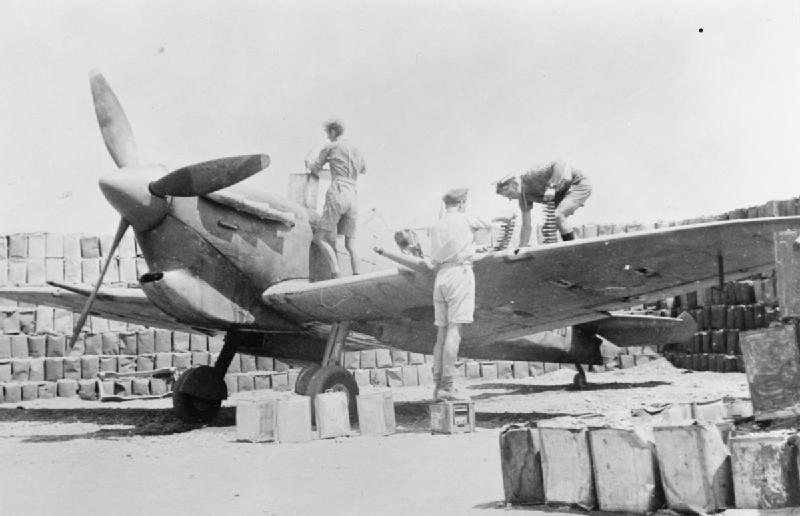
Refuelling and rearming a Spitfire Mark VC(T), in a revetment constructed from empty fuel tins filled with sand at RAF Ta Kali, Malta in 1942

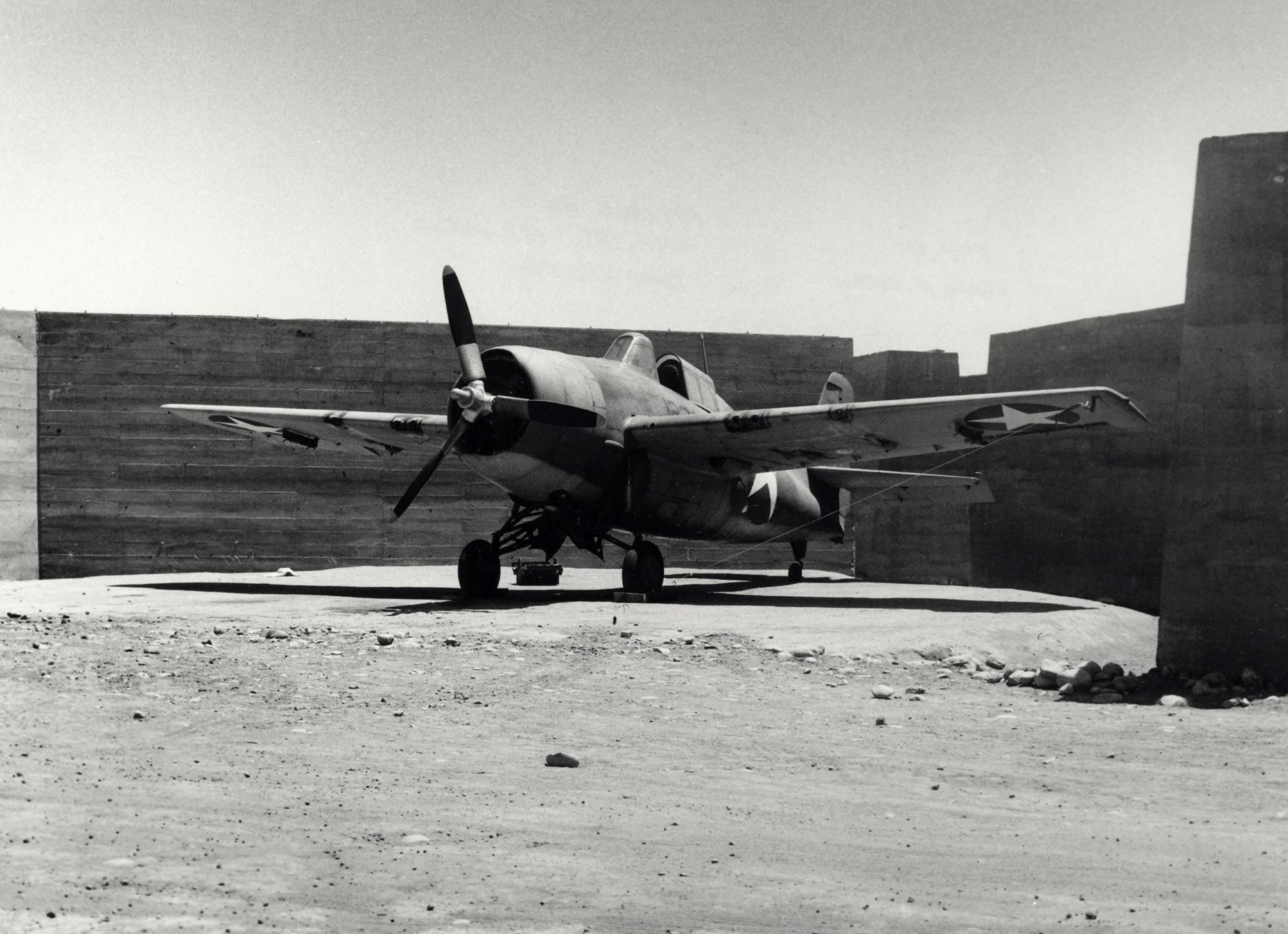
A US Marine Corps Grumman F4F-4 Wildcat in a concrete revetment in 1942 at Camp Kearny, California

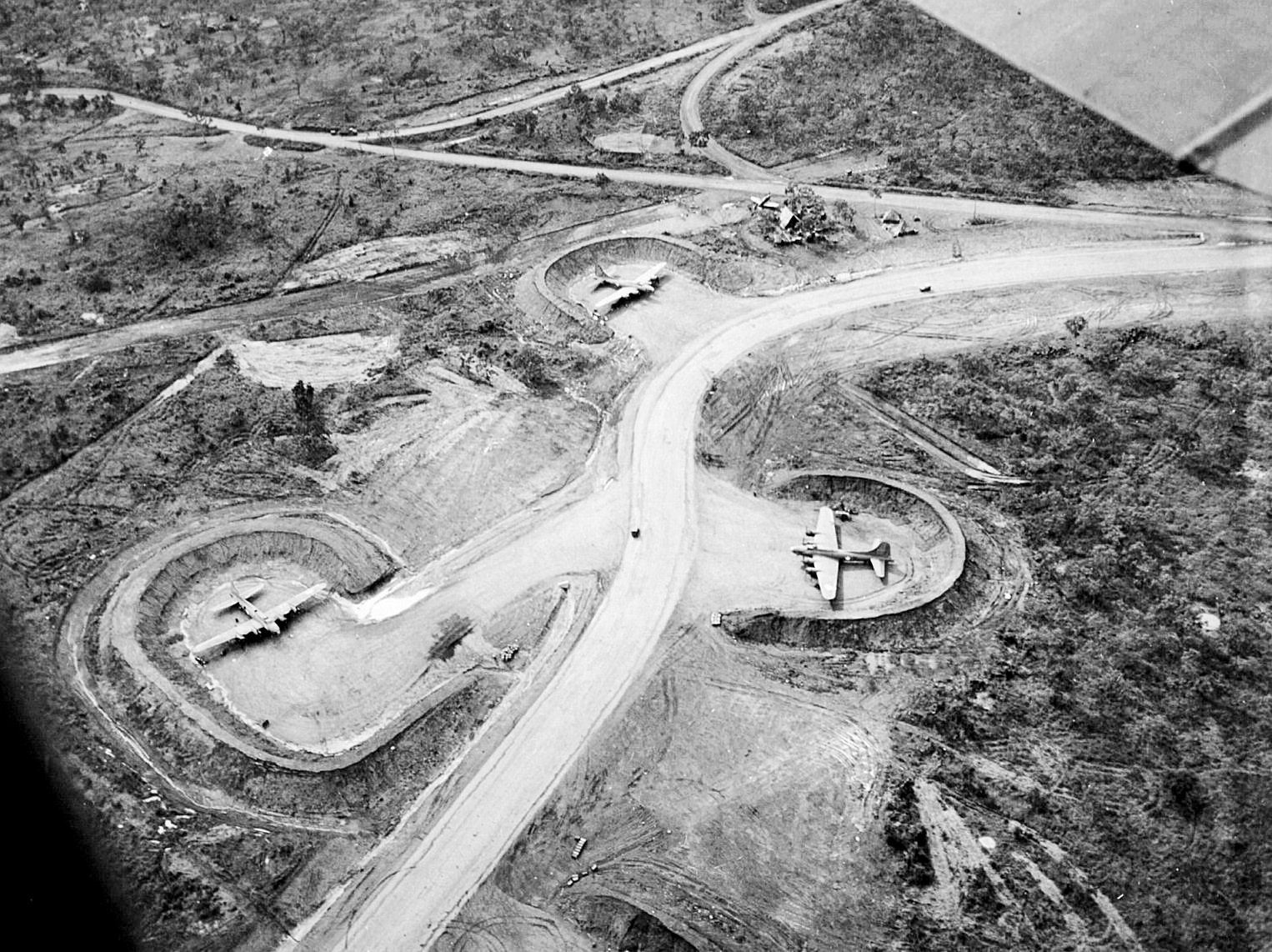
B-17 Flying Fortress bombers parked in revetments at Jackson Airfield, New Guinea, in 1943

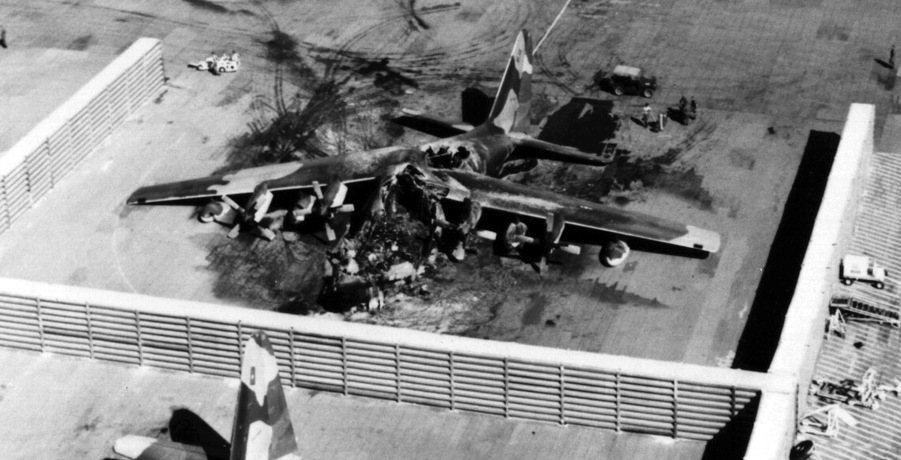
A destroyed US Air Force Lockheed C-130 Hercules in Vietnam, c. 1967

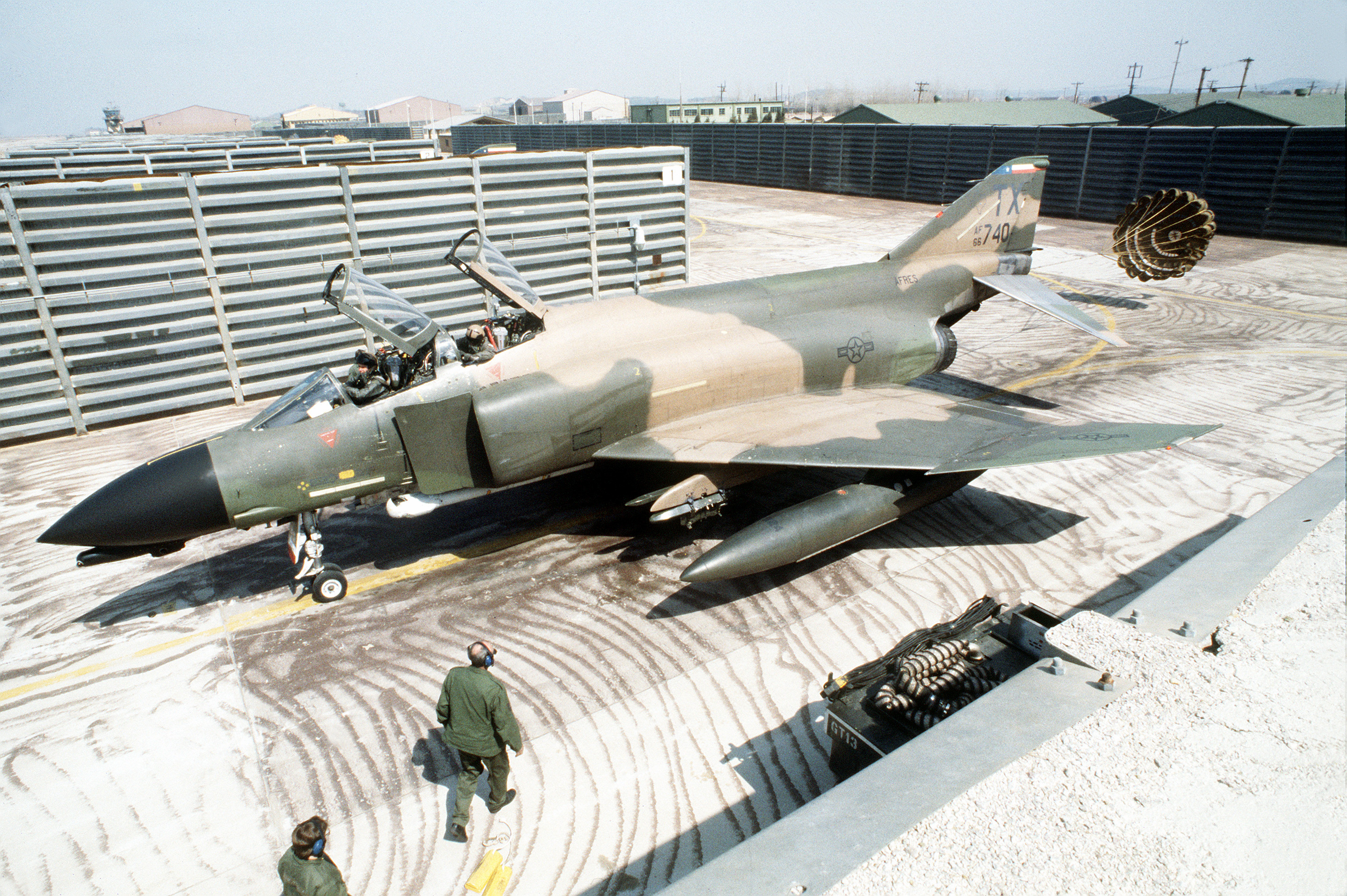
A McDonnell Douglas F-4D Phantom II aircraft moving into a revetment made from profiled steel panels at Kunsan Air Base, South Korea

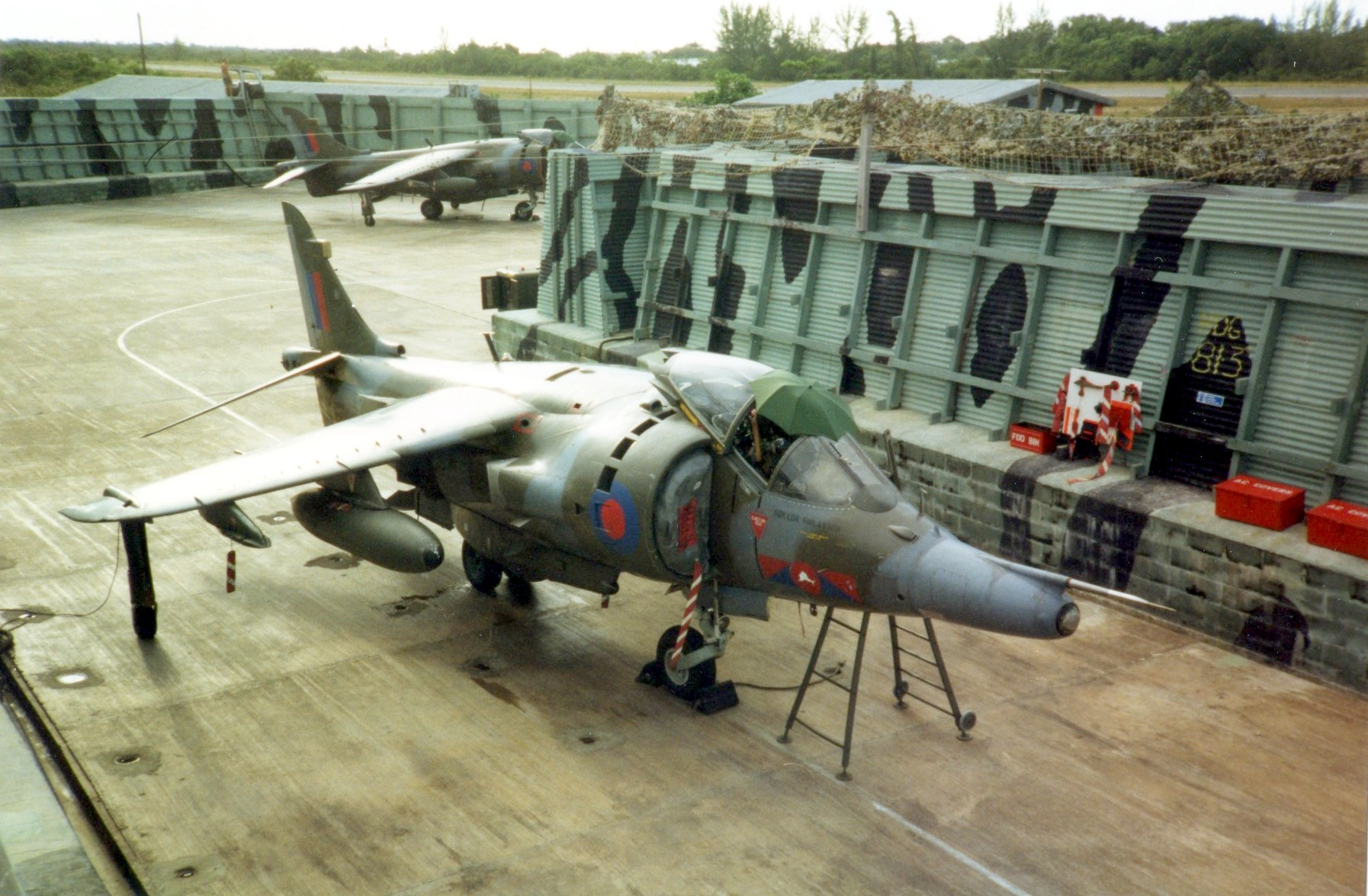
A British Aerospace Harrier GR3 in a revetment at Belize International Airport in 1990

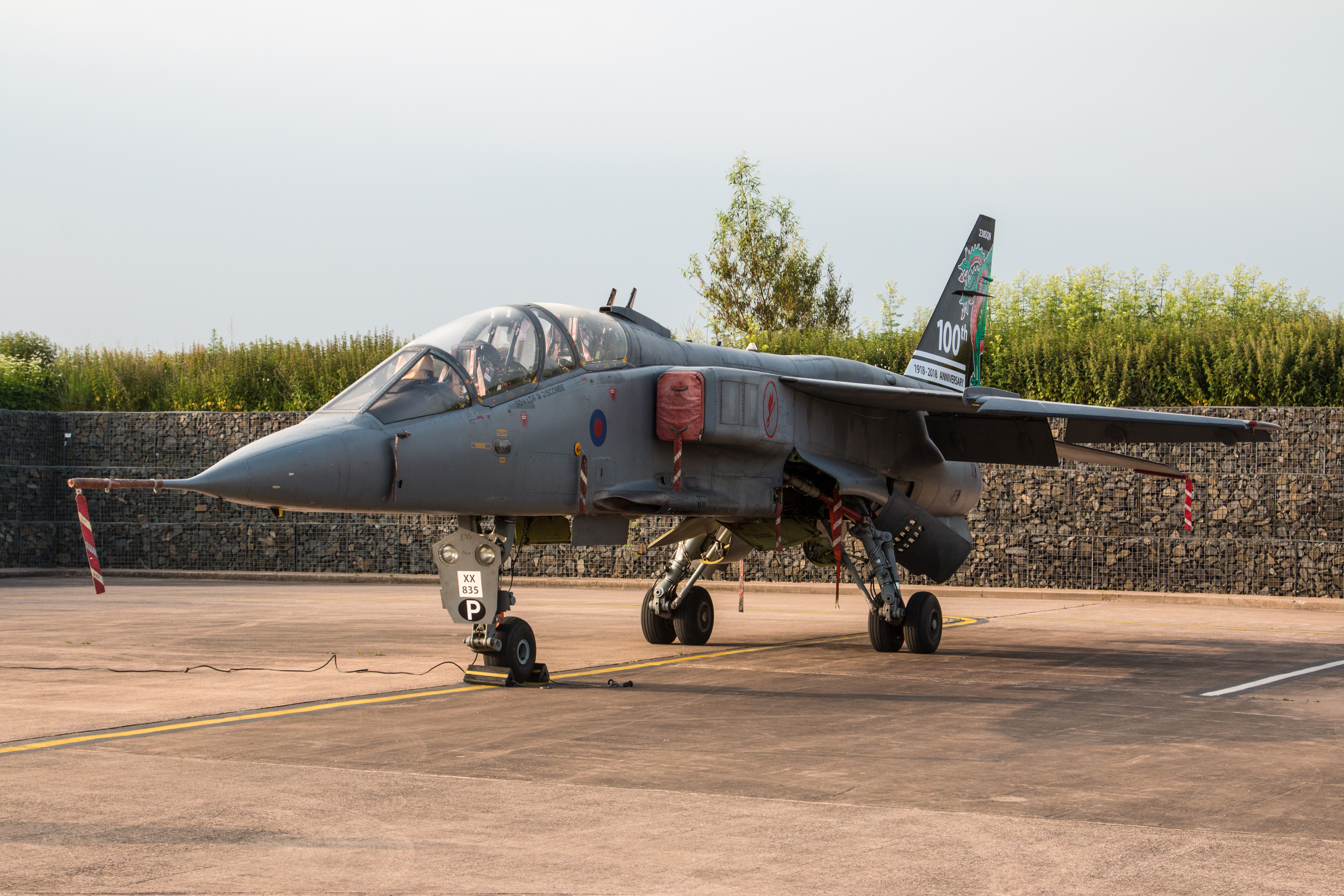
SEPECAT Jaguar T4 in a revetment built from gabions at RAF Cosford in 2018

== See also ==
- Revetment (a sloped wall)
- Hardened aircraft shelter

== Bibliography ==
- Flint, Peter (1985). R.A.F. Kenley. Terence Dalton Limited. p. 158. ISBN 0-86138-036-3.
