= Hesco bastion =

Flood control and military fortification barrier

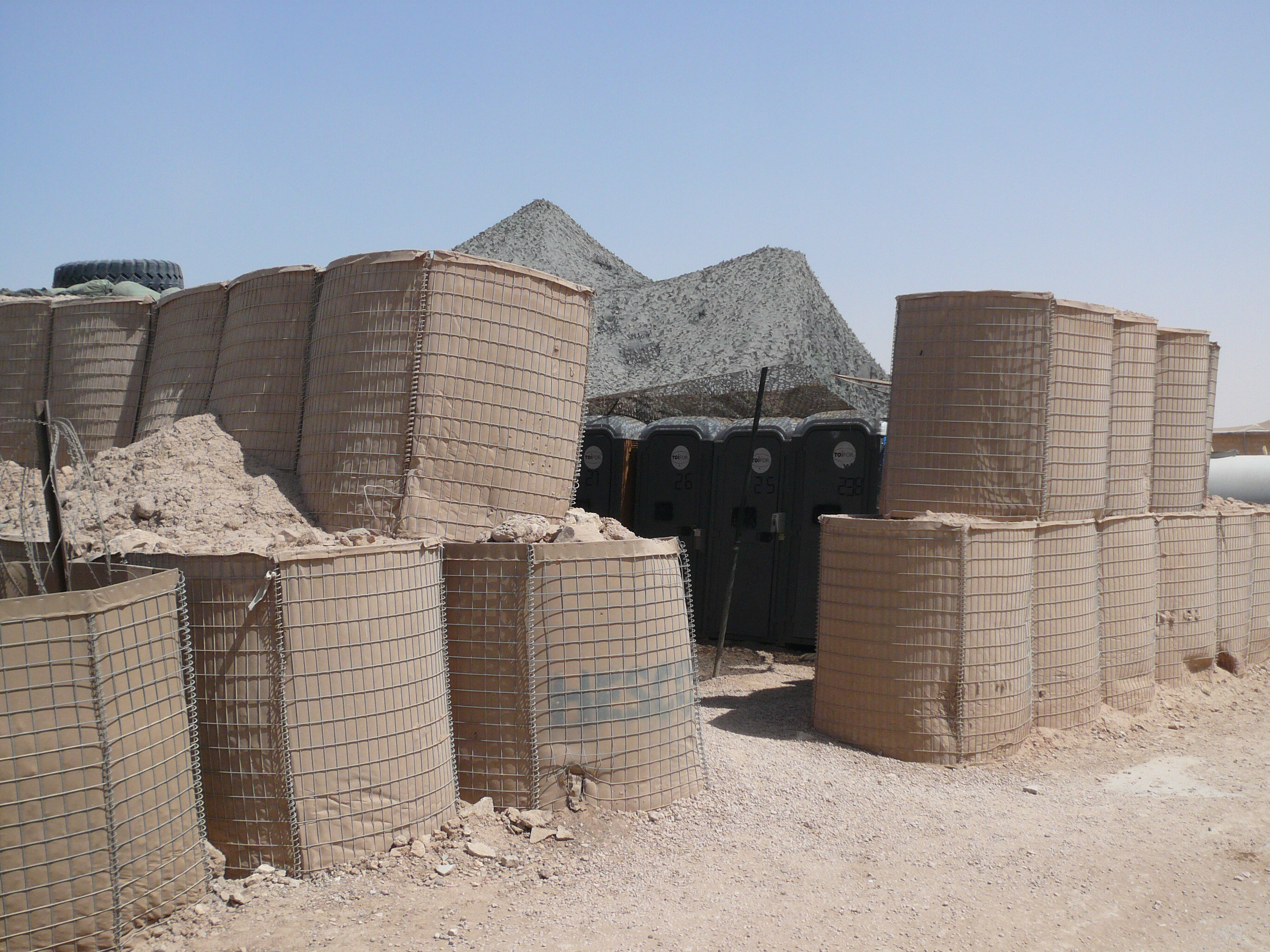
HESCO MIL units stacked two units high around portable toilets in US-occupied Iraq

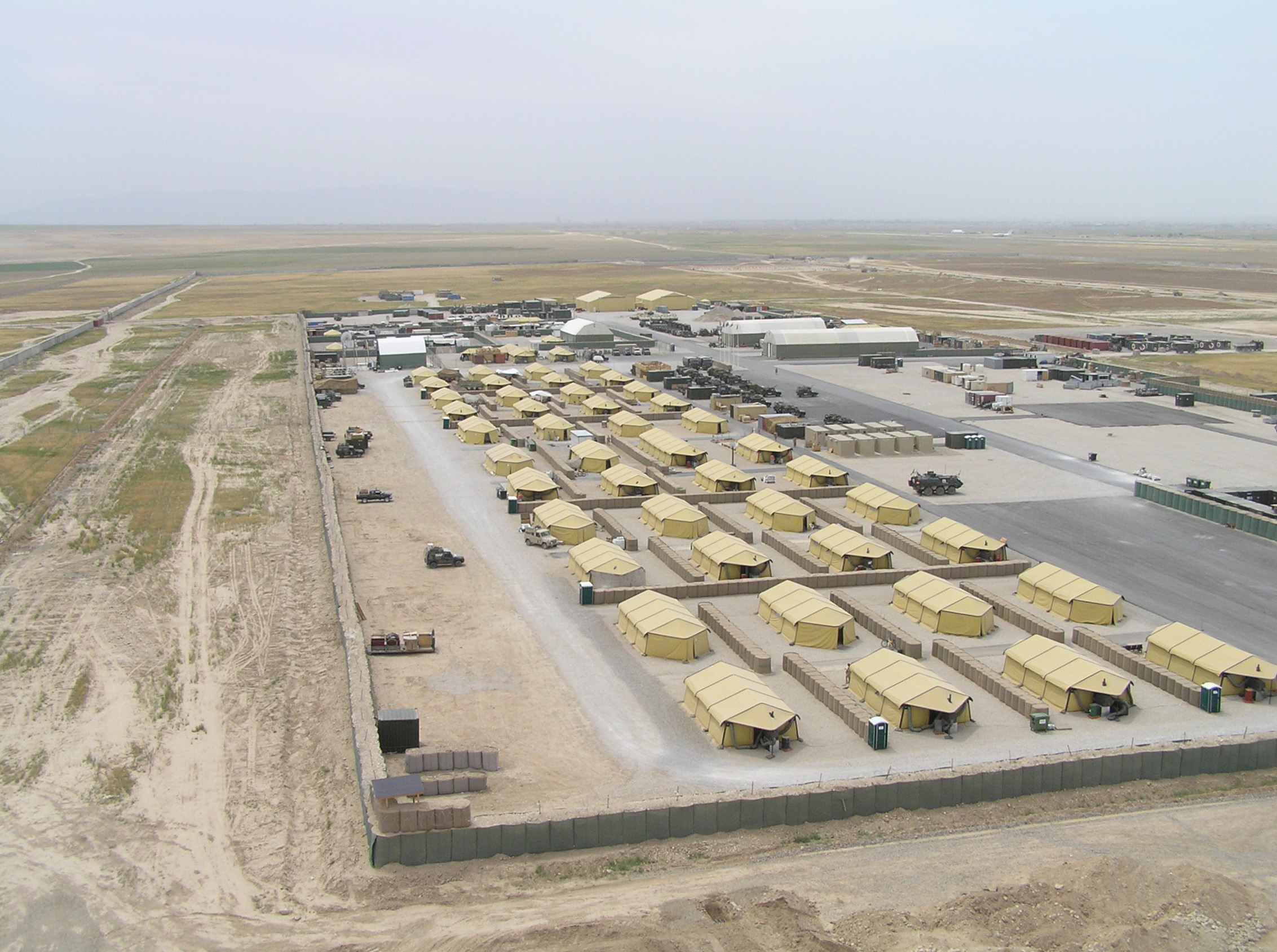
German base (Norwegian section) inside Camp Marmal near Mazar-i-Sharif, Afghanistan. Note the internal lines of gabions to reduce and compartmentalize mortar effects.

A Hesco bastion, also known as a Hesco barrier, and formally Concertainer, is a gabion introduced in 1989 and primarily used for flood control and military fortifications. It is made of a collapsible wire mesh container and heavy-duty geotextile fabric liner and is used as a temporary to semi-permanent levee or blast wall against small-arms fire or explosives. It has been used in military applications in Iraq and Afghanistan.

== History ==
British ex-coal miner Jimi Heselden designed a geotextile fabric-lined bastion for erosion and flood control on beaches and in marshes. He founded HESCO Bastion Ltd. in 1989 to produce what he dubbed the “Concertainer”, a portmanteau of "concertina" and "container" for the unique way that units fold flat like a concertina for efficient packaging, handling, and erection.

Hesco bastions were used in 2005 to reinforce levees around New Orleans in the weeks between Hurricane Katrina and Hurricane Rita. During the June 2008 Midwest floods, 8,200 metres (9,000 yd) of HESCO barrier wall were shipped to Iowa. In late March 2009, 10,700 m (11,700 yd) of HESCO barrier were delivered to Fargo, North Dakota, to protect against floods. In late September 2016, 16 km (10 mi) of HESCO barriers were used in Cedar Rapids, Iowa, for the fall flood of 2016.

== Assembly ==
Assembling the HESCO unit entails unfolding it and filling it with sand, soil or gravel, usually using a front end loader.

The HESCO barriers are varied in sizes and models. Most of the barriers can also be stacked, and they are shipped collapsed in compact sets.

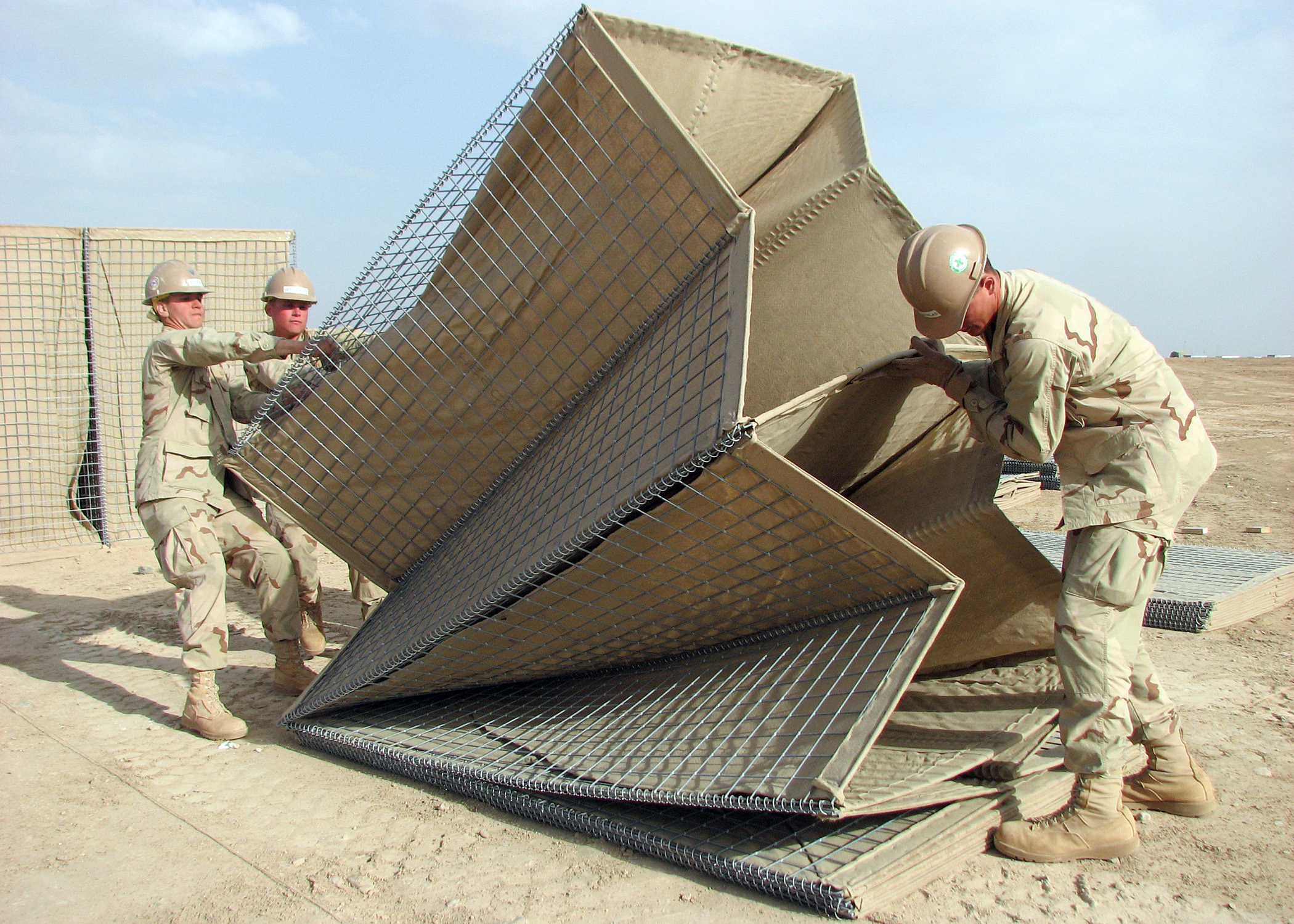
United States Navy Seabees assembling HESCO MIL units

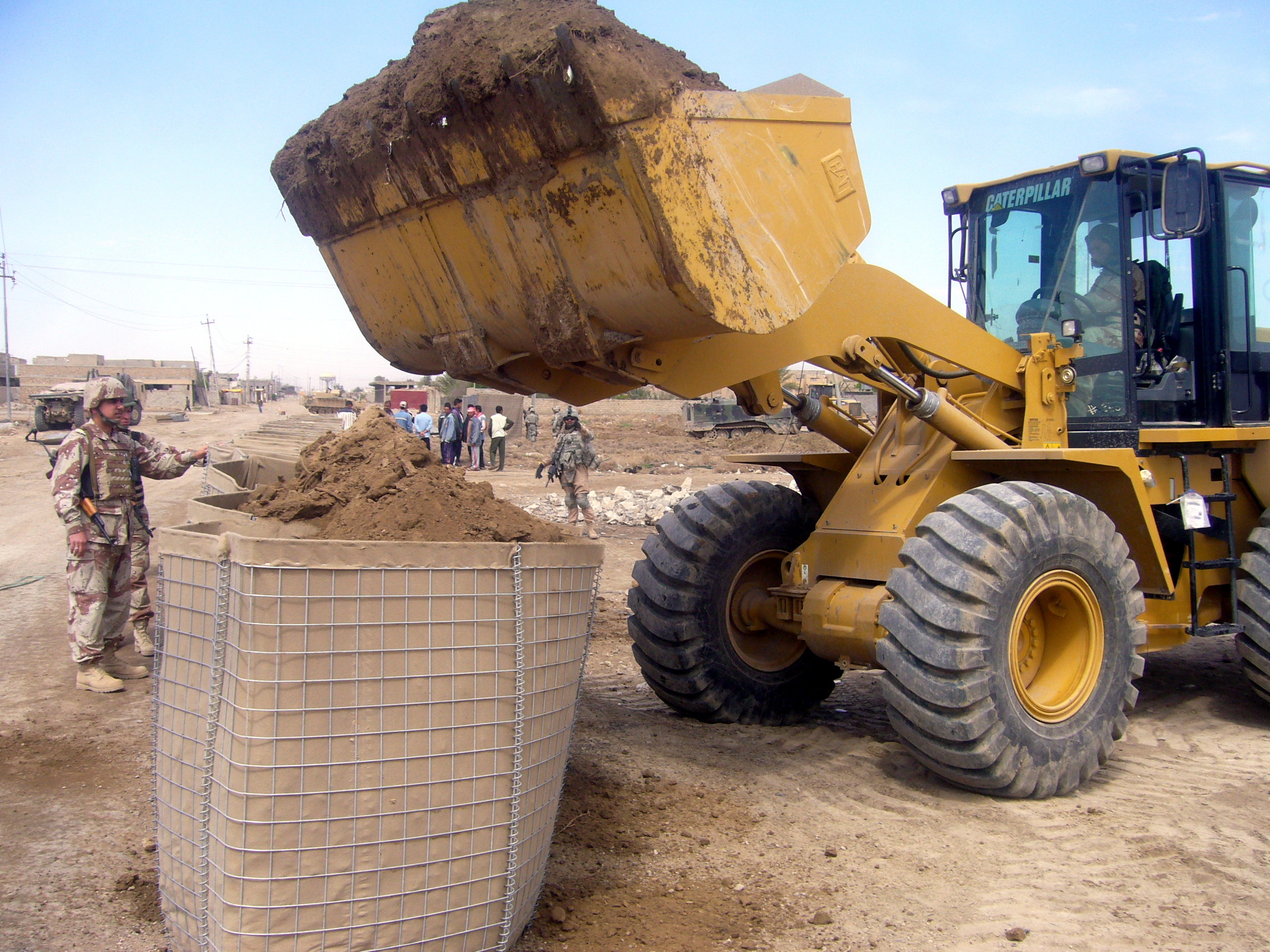
Iraqi Army engineers fill a section of four-foot HESCO MIL with a wheel loader

Installation of portable flood control barriers at the North Luzon Expressway, Philippines

== Variants ==
Since the original concertainer, HESCO has developed specialized variants, including:

- a rapid in-theatre deployment design (in which a container is dragged along the ground to deploy multiple barriers);
- an "accommodation bunker" (with an aluminum roof and a pre-detonation screen);
- a "Terrablock" combining concertainer ballast and metal mesh fencing;
- a lightweight overhead protection system; and,
- the Sangar, a fortification kit consisting of MIL walls, protective roof, and windows.

== See also ==
- Bremer wall – steel-reinforced concrete blast walls
