= Blast wall =

Barrier for protection from an explosion

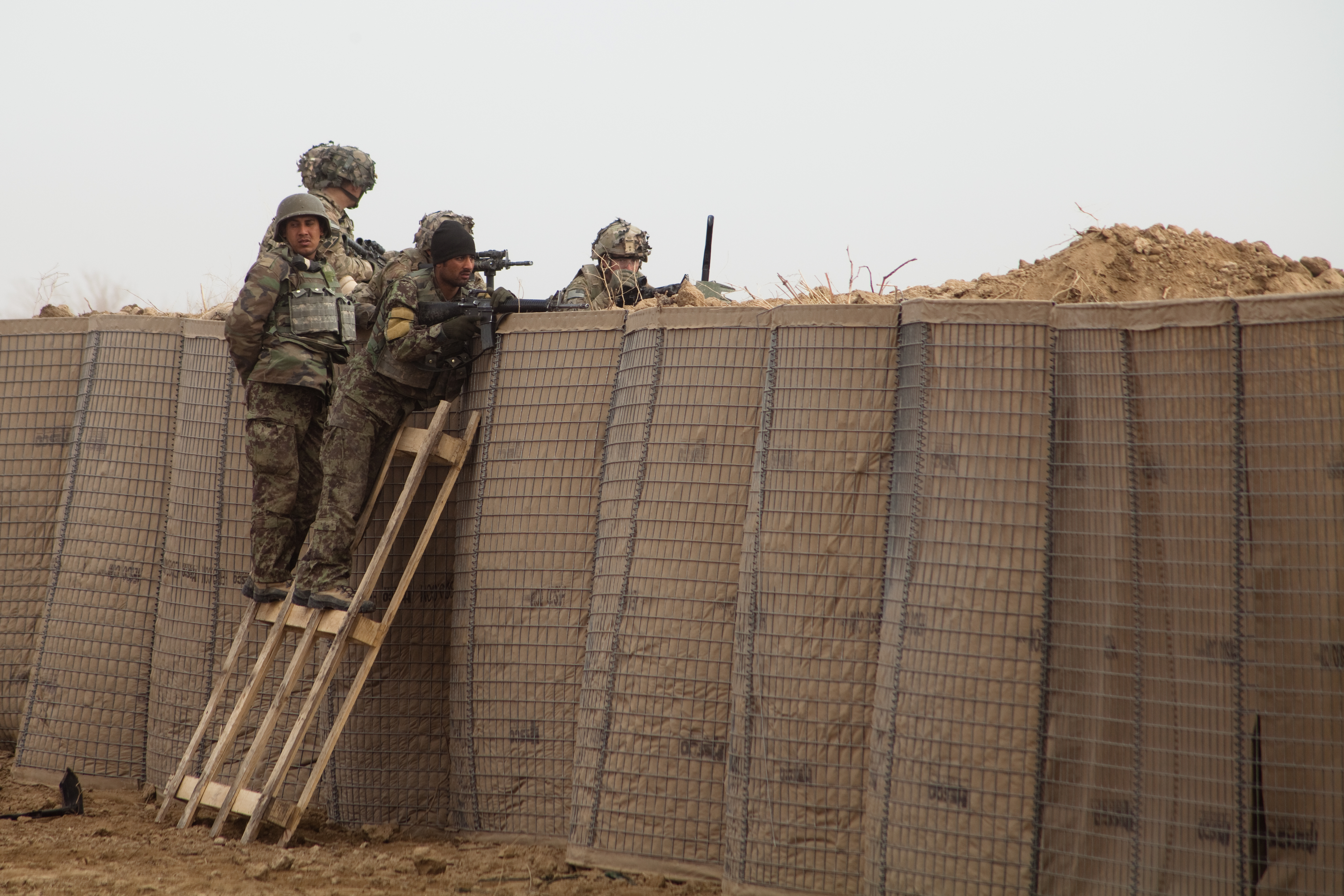
U.S. and Afghan soldiers standing behind a blast wall made from HESCO bastions in Afghanistan in 2012

A blast wall is a barrier designed to protect vulnerable buildings or other structures and the people inside them from the effects of a nearby explosion, whether caused by industrial accident, military action, or terrorism.

== Effectiveness ==
Research by Cranfield University Defence Academy, building on earlier work, has shown that blast walls have the following properties:

- A non-deforming upright wall will significantly reduce the peak blast overpressure and impulse in an area between 4 and 6 wall heights behind it
- Similar protection occurs at greater distances behind the wall, but to a diminishing extent
- Blast walls perform best if the explosion is relatively close to the front of the wall
- "Canopied" walls (with a top section overhanging the front face) show some improved blast protection over plane walls
- A 90-degree canopy is more effective than a 45-degree one
- Walls containing sand or water work well, and cause little damage if they fail
- A wall has to stay intact long enough to "interact" with the blast in order to have any effect

== Types ==
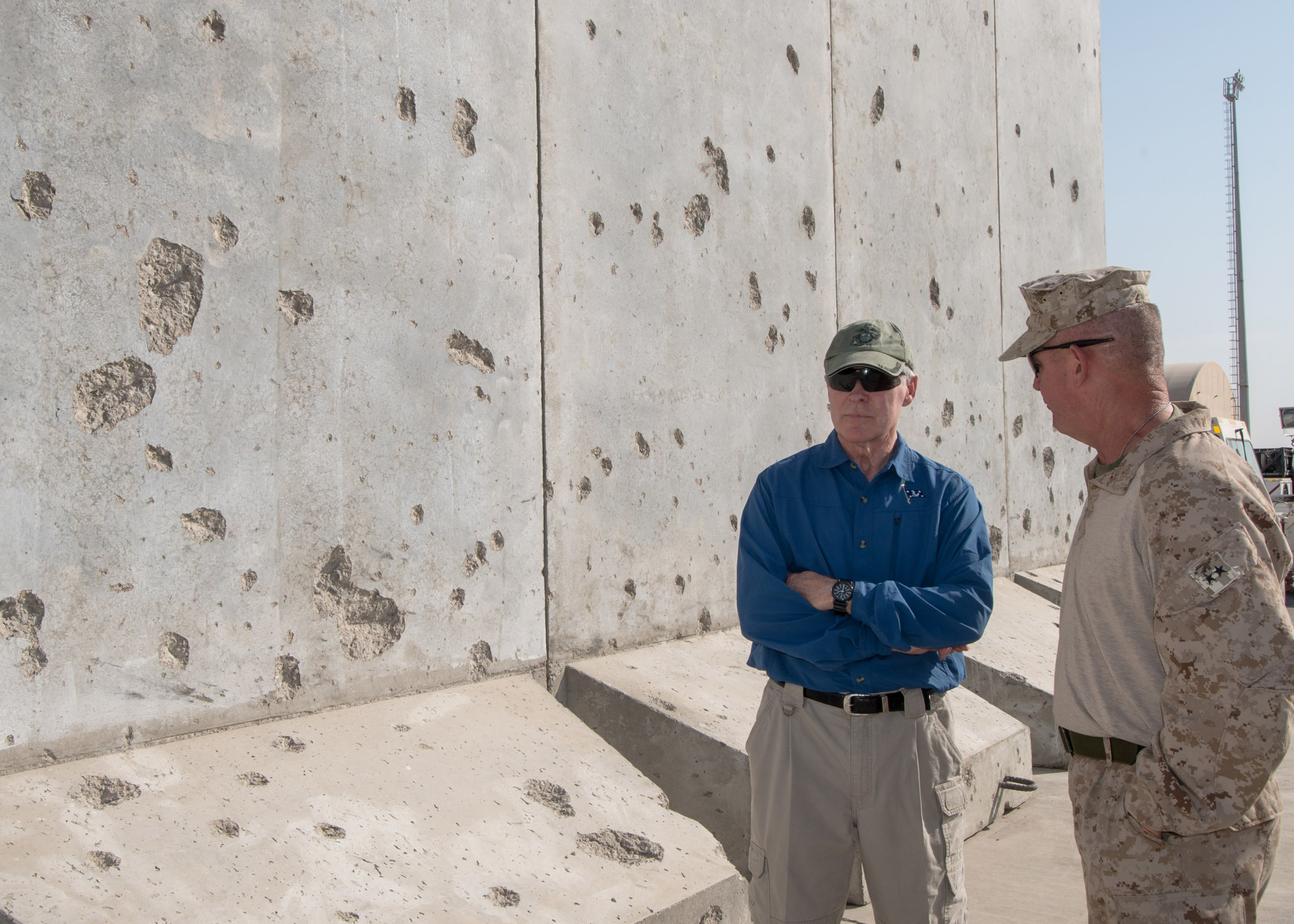
Damage to Bremer wall concrete barriers in Afghanistan, 2012

Permanent blast walls can be made from pre-cast reinforced concrete, or steel sheeting. Various types of moveable blast wall have been manufactured. These include the Bremer wall concrete barriers used in Iraq and Afghanistan by US Armed Forces, and the Concertainers, wire mesh containers filled with sand or soil, which are used by British Armed Forces.

== See also ==
- Blast shelter
- Shockwave
- Revetment (aircraft)
