= F-shape barrier =

Road safety barrier used to separate vehicle traffic

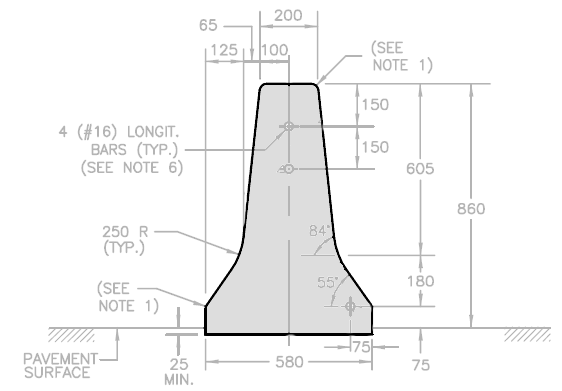

The F-shape barrier is a concrete crash barrier, originally designed to divide lanes of traffic on a highway. It is a modification of the widely used Jersey barrier design, and is generally considered safer.

A parametric study, one that systematically varies the parameters, was done through computer simulations of barrier profiles labeled A through F. The result showed that the one labeled F performed better than even the shape of the Jersey barrier. A series of full-scale crash tests later confirmed these computer-based results. What is known today as the F-shape barrier takes its name from the label it was given on these tests and not from any part of the shape of the barrier, unlike, for example, T-walls.

In spite of these tests, the F-shape barrier has not supplanted the Jersey-shape. The Jersey-shape barrier was already in wide use, and it also met the crash-test criteria. The states' contractors already had a significant investment in the Jersey-shape casting forms and it would cost them money to change the profiles of the forms.

The F-shape and the Jersey-shape have the same slopes, but the distance from the ground to the slope break point of the F-shape is 255 millimetres (10.0 in), which is 75 millimetres (3.0 in) lower than the Jersey-shape. This lower slope break point reduces vehicle lift, improving the barrier's performance.

Because the Jersey-shape design requires very little modification to become an F-shape design, asphalt resurfacing, because it raises the overall height of the road surface relative to the barrier, can convert the Jersey-shape barrier into a more F-shape-like barrier that is safer for lighter cars. However, these increased layers of asphalt also reduce the working height of the barrier, reducing its effectiveness for heavier vehicles.

The F-shape barrier has been adopted in British Columbia as the Ministry of Transportation and Transit's Concrete Median Barrier although some of BC's dimensions differ by several millimeters. A smaller Concrete Roadside Barrier is also widely used in the province.

The UK equivalent is the concrete step barrier.

== See also ==
- Jersey barrier
- Constant-slope barrier
