= Concrete step barrier =

Safety barrier used on the central reservation of motorways

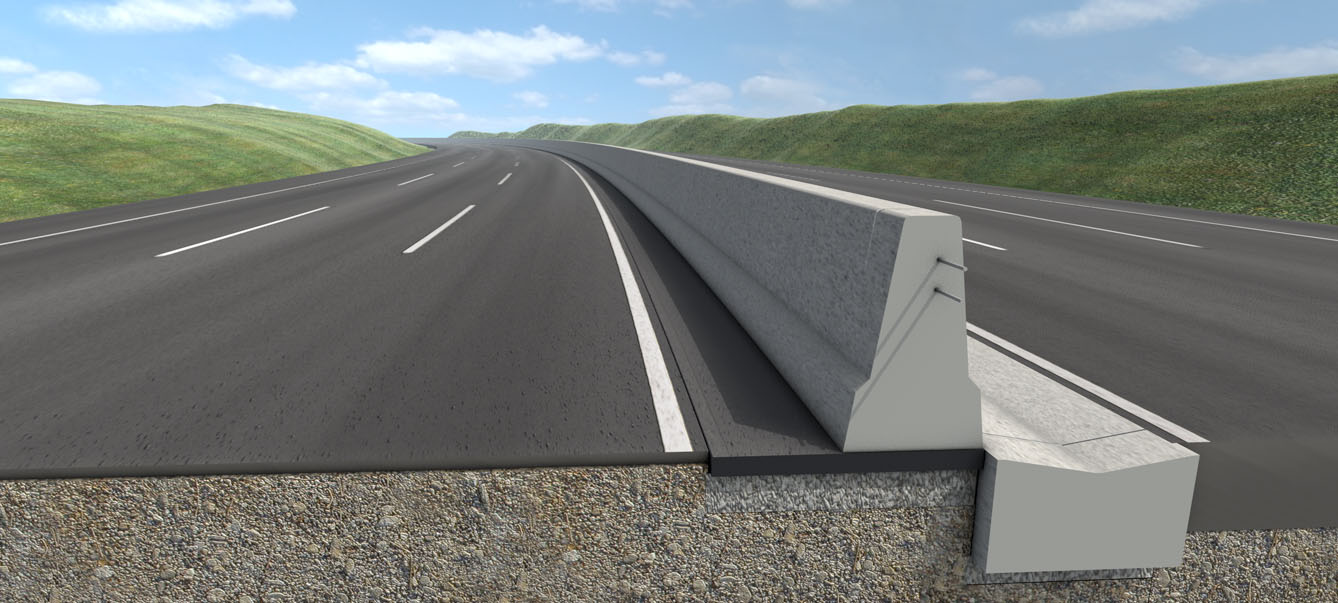
Concrete step barrier cross-section

A concrete step barrier is a safety barrier used on the central reservation of motorways and dual carriageways as an alternative to the standard steel crash barrier.

== United Kingdom ==
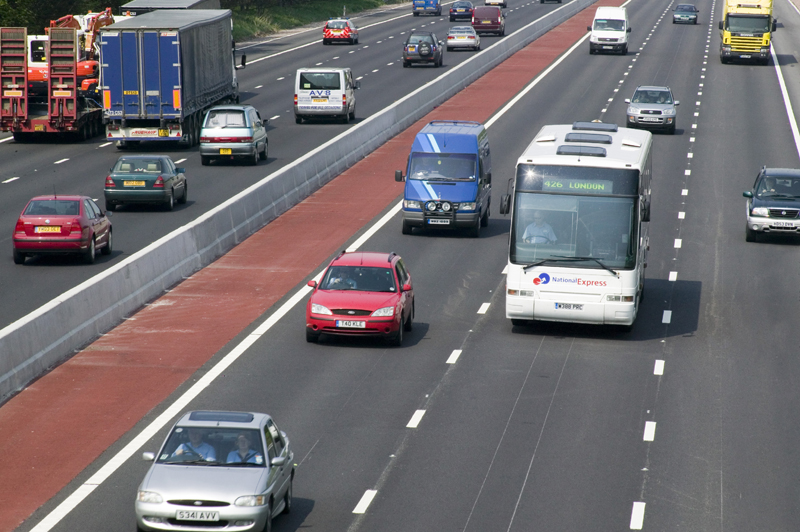
Concrete step barrier on M1 motorway (UK)

With effect from January 2005 and based primarily on safety grounds, the UK National Highways policy is that all new motorway schemes are to use high-containment concrete barriers in the central reserve. All existing motorways will introduce concrete barriers into the central reserve as part of ongoing upgrades and through replacement when these systems have reached the end of their useful life. This change of policy applies only to barriers in the central reserve of high-speed roads and not to verge-side barriers. Other routes will continue to use steel barriers. Government policy ensures that all future crash barriers in the UK will be made of concrete unless there are overriding circumstances.

== Ireland ==
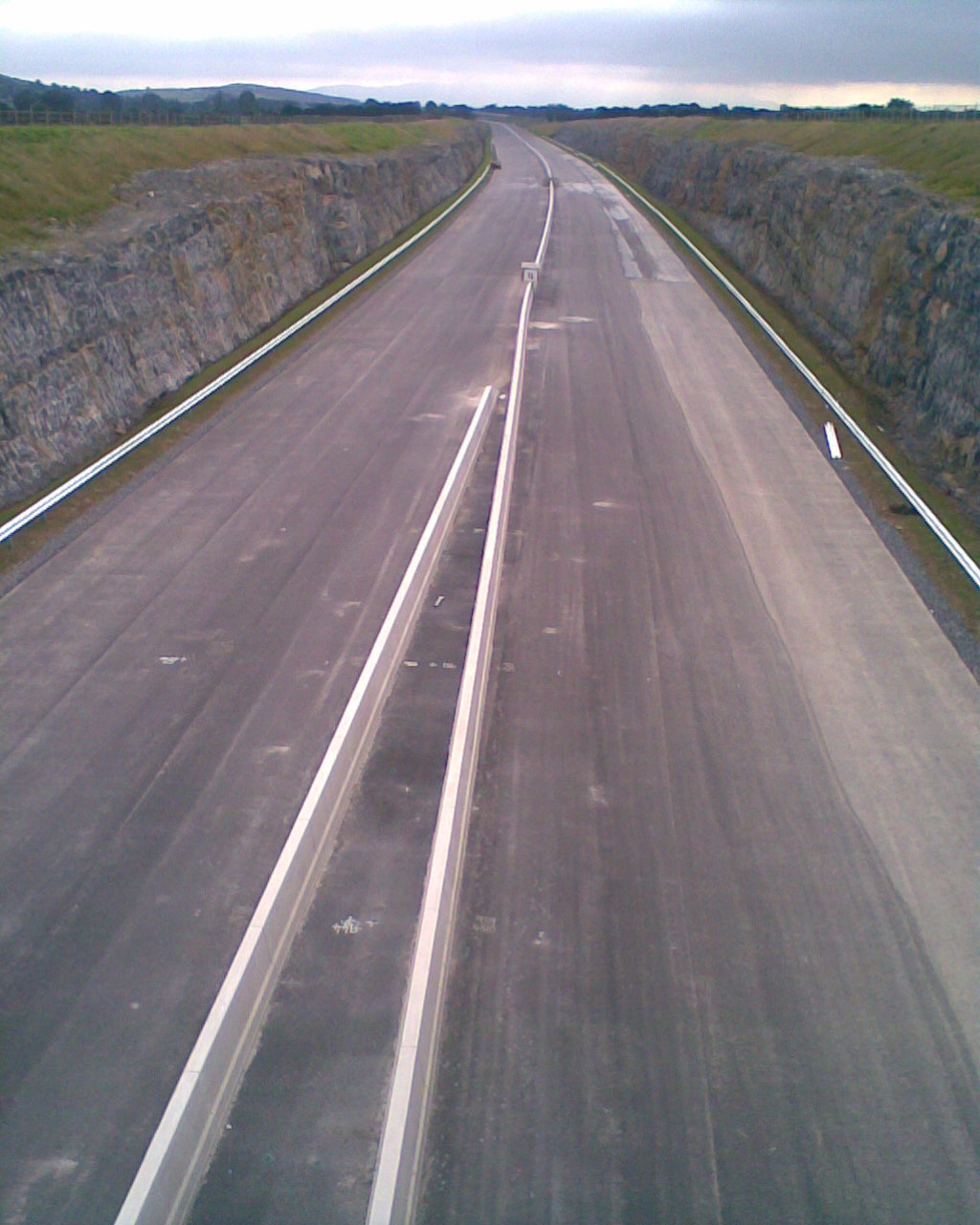
The concrete step barrier in the under-construction M8 motorway in Ireland (August 2008)

The usage of the concrete step barrier has become widespread in Ireland. As of 2017, 530 kilometres (330 mi) of motorways use this barrier. Some motorways such as parts of the M8 and M6 have had the crash barrier since their original construction. Other motorways had it installed as part of their upgrade (M50).

== Hong Kong ==
Steel guard rails (since 2000s as thrie-beam barrier) and concrete profile barrier are the barrier systems used in expressways in the territory. The designs of their beam barrier are based in American and Australian designs and concrete based in European standards.

== Degradation processes ==
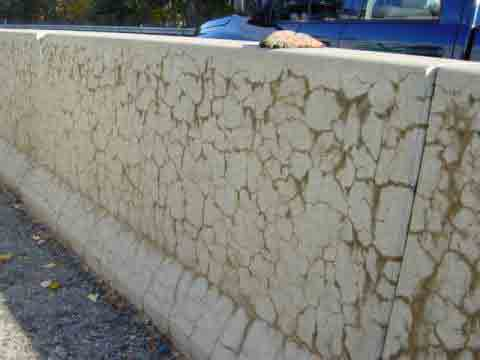
Typical crack pattern associated with the alkali–silica reaction, affecting a Jersey barrier on a US highway

Various types of aggregate may undergo chemical reactions in concrete, leading to damaging expansive phenomena. The most common are those containing reactive silica, that can react with the alkalis in concrete. Amorphous silica is one of the most reactive mineral components in some aggregates containing e.g., opal, chalcedony, flint. Following the alkali–silica reaction (ASR) an expansive gel can form, creating extensive cracks and damaging structural members.

== See also ==
- Jersey barrier
- Constant-slope barrier
- F-shape barrier
- Road-traffic safety
- Traffic barrier
