= Bremer wall =

Type of barrier used to protect structures against damage from explosions

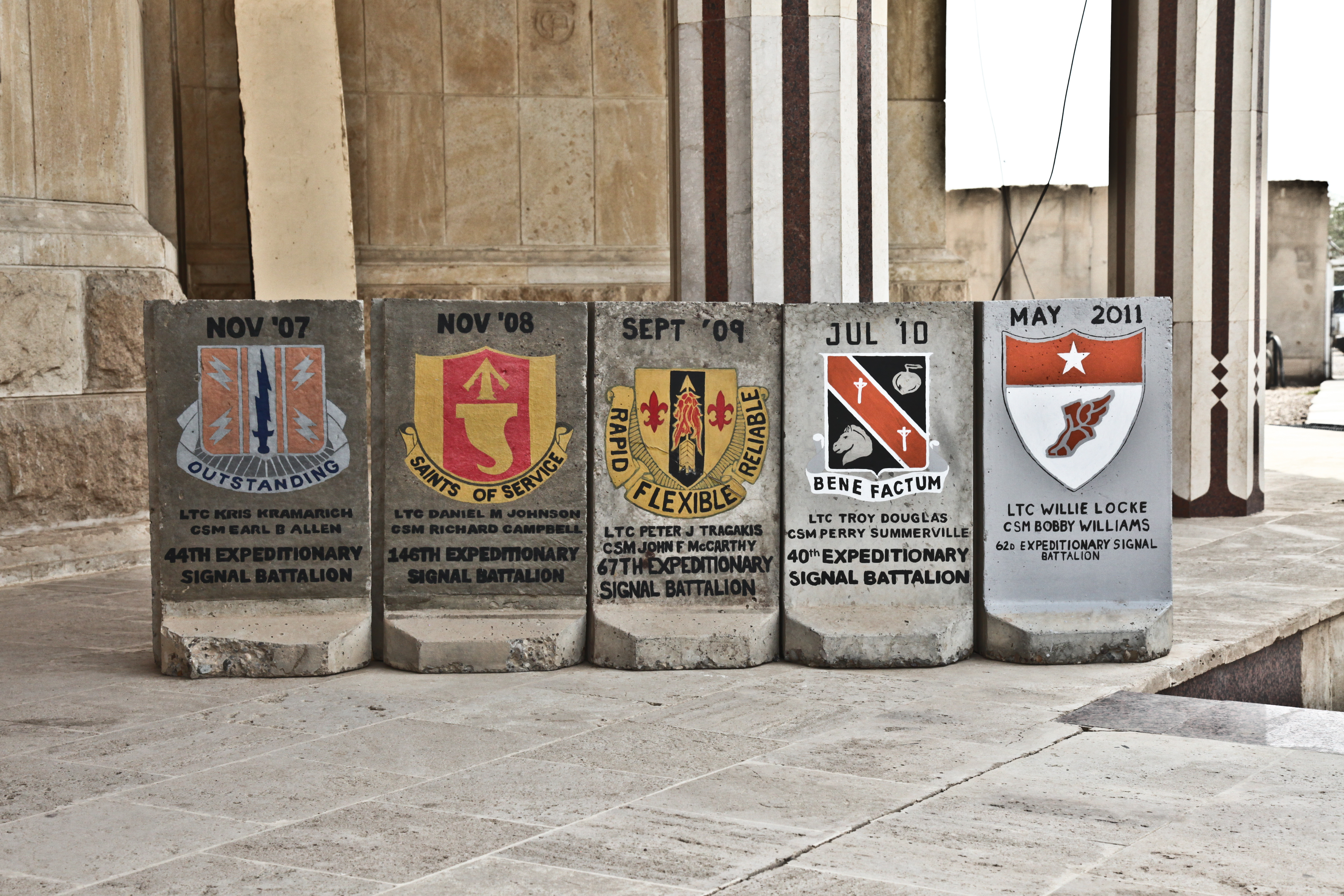
A short T-wall painted with various military signs is seen at Camp Liberty, Iraq

A Bremer wall, or T-wall, is a twelve-foot-tall (3.66 m) portable, steel-reinforced concrete blast wall of the type used for blast protection throughout Iraq and Afghanistan.

The Bremer barrier resembles the smaller 3-foot-tall (0.91 m) Jersey barrier, which has been used widely for vehicle traffic control on coalition military bases in Iraq and Afghanistan. To indicate that the Bremer barrier is similar but larger, the 12-foot-tall (3.66 m), intermediate-sized Bremer barriers are usually referred to as Texas barriers, but not to be confused with the 3.5-foot (1.07 m) Texas constant-slope barrier. Similarly, the largest barriers, which stand around 20 feet (6.1 m) tall, are called Alaska barriers. Unlike the Jersey barrier, which has sloped sides at the base, some Texas and Alaska barriers have a rectangular ledge base, usable as a bench for sitting or resting and approximately knee-high for a typical adult.

== Etymology ==
These T-shaped walls were originally developed by the Israelis in the Israeli West Bank barrier. The term "T-wall" has been used commonly, due to the wall's cross-sectional shape resembling an inverted letter "T".

The name is believed to have originated from L. Paul Bremer of the Coalition Provisional Authority, who was the Director of Reconstruction and Humanitarian Assistance for post-war Iraq, following the Iraq War of 2003, in the early years of the Iraq War.

== Uses ==
T-walls have proven to be an effective weapon on the modern battlefield. Often made of a special type of concrete that is designed to withstand the impact of explosions and reinforced with steel bars and is significantly thicker and heavier than traditional concrete, they are primarily used to provide protection against improvised explosive devices (IEDs), rocket attacks, and other forms of indirect fire. As a result, Bremer walls are capable of stopping or deflecting even the most powerful explosive devices. Much like Concertainer, T-wall barriers were commonly used as perimeter fortifications of forward operating bases during the war on terror.

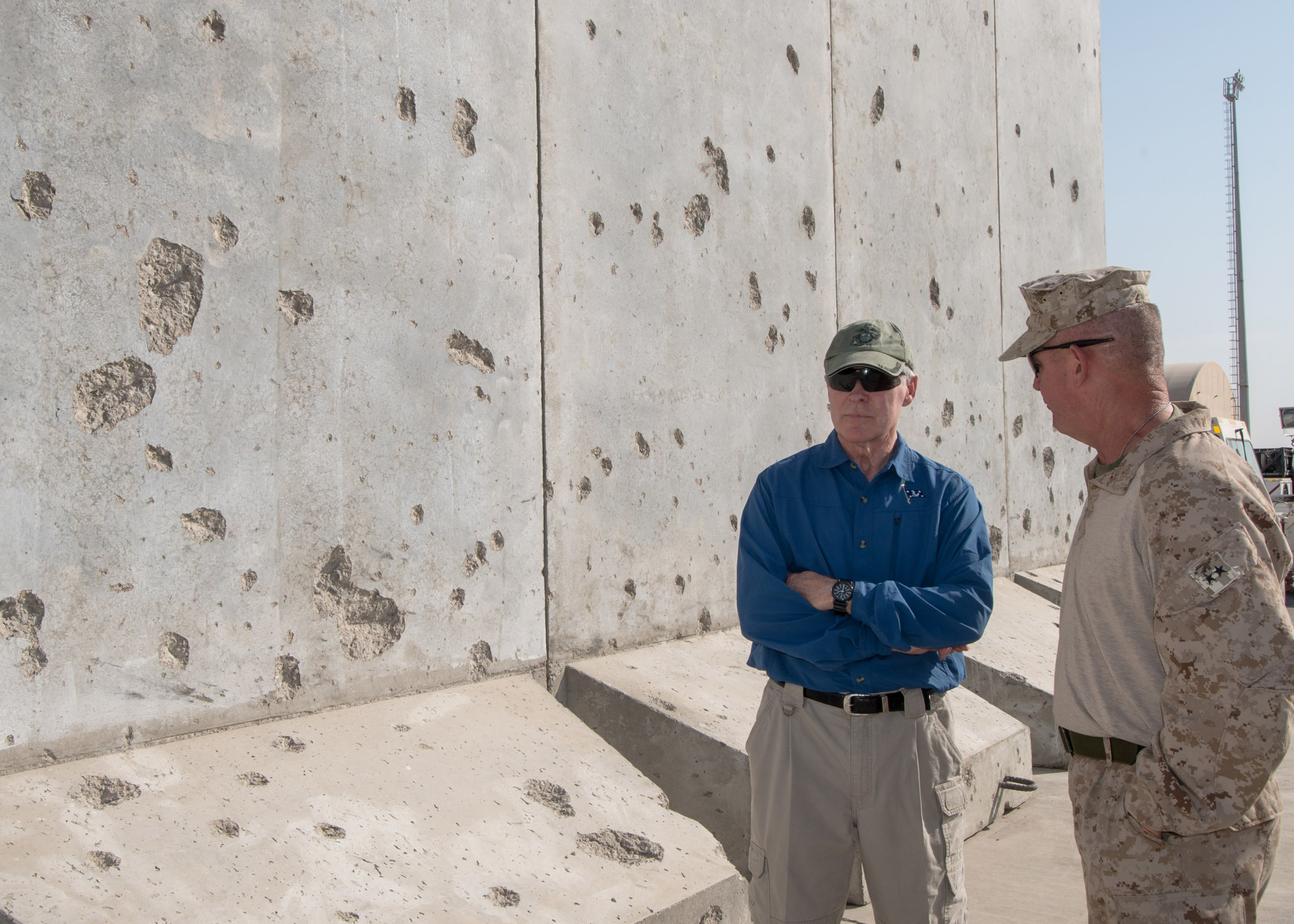
Damage to Bremer wall concrete barriers in Afghanistan, 2012

During the Iraq war, US forces found concrete to be their most effective weapon to reduce violence and protect the local population from sectarian violence while impeding the movement of insurgents. At an average cost of $600 per wall in the mid-2000s, billions of dollars were spent constructing and placing these concrete fortifications throughout the country, to wall off whole roads and neighborhoods and to create what was dubbed "safe communities." Walling off troubled neighborhoods and maintaining the barriers became the daily mission for many security forces. In Baghdad's Sadr City district, for example, over 30 miles (48 km) of 12-foot-tall (3.66 m) concrete T-wall barriers were employed to create what were dubbed "safe communities."

== T-wall art ==
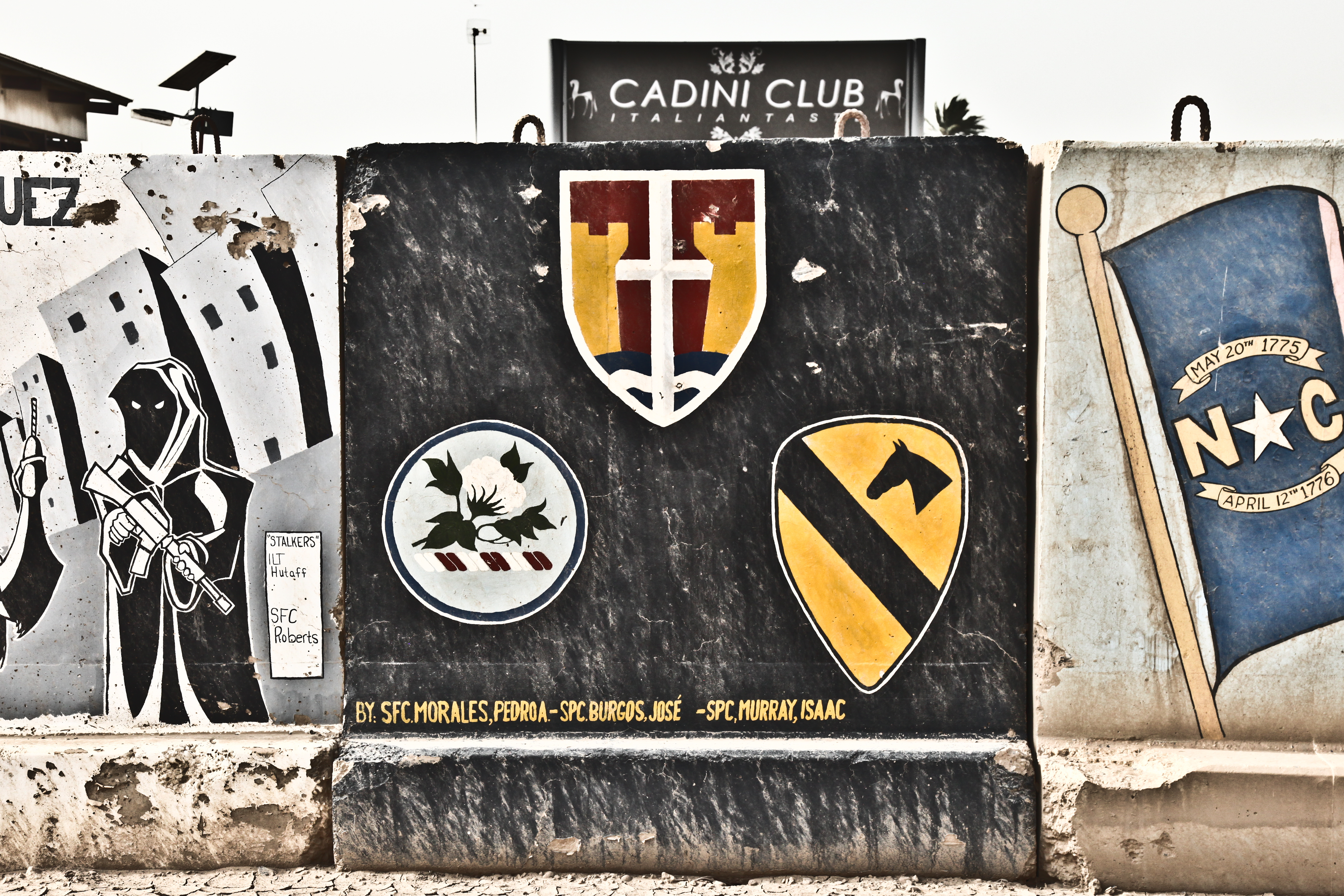

In addition to offering protection, T-walls became a popular medium for soldiers and civilians to express themselves with graffiti and folk art, drawing a remarkable parallel with the aircraft nose art typical of previous conflicts. Many deployed military units painted nearby T-walls with their insignia, colors, mottos and, mascots. These art pieces ranged from simple stencil art and graffiti to elaborate memorials and murals. T-walls and the work that adorned them were so omnipresent in base life of the Iraq and Afghanistan conflicts that customized miniature T-walls were routinely given as going-away gifts to personnel ending their deployments.
