= Constant-slope barrier =

Concrete traffic barrier

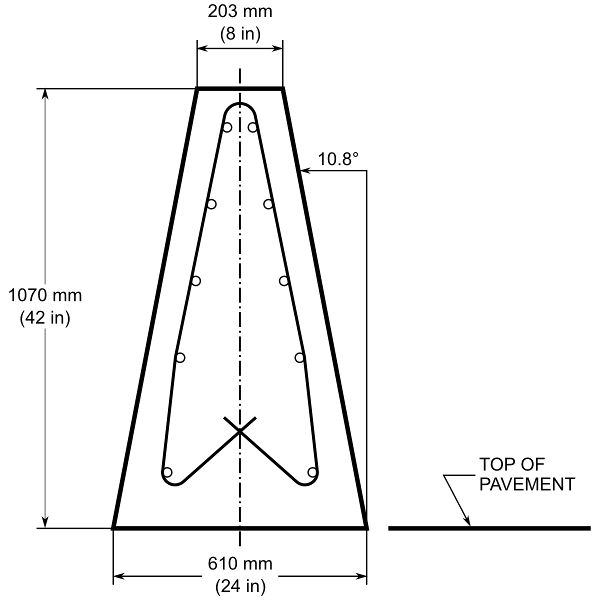
Cross-section diagram of a constant-slope barrier

A constant-slope barrier is a traffic barrier made of reinforced concrete and designed with a single slope, used to separate lanes of vehicular traffic. Its advantages compared to more complex shapes arise because its performance is not as affected by changes in the height of the roadbed during repaving.

The Texas Constant-Slope Barrier is 1,070 mm (42 in) high and has a constant slope face that makes an angle of 10.8 degrees with respect to the vertical. California has developed a constant-slope barrier with an angle of 9.1 degrees with respect to the vertical. The Texas Constant-Slope barrier has performed similarly in crash tests to the Jersey barrier. The California design compared similarly to the F-Shape barrier in crash tests.
