= Landmark Award =

NASCAR Hall of Fame award

The Landmark Award for Outstanding Contributions to NASCAR is an award in the NASCAR Hall of Fame that is presented to someone who has made significant contributions to NASCAR. The award was created in 2015 and was designed for people who were not drivers to be recognized in the Hall of Fame (drivers can still be nominated and win the award, Janet Guthrie in 2024 was the first driver to win the award). Previously, these people (such as the inaugural Landmark Award winner Anne France) were mixed in with members of race teams (drivers, crew chiefs, team owners, etc.) as nominees for the NASCAR Hall of Fame, although this is no longer the case.

== Recipients ==
Year	Person	Image	Role
2015	Anne France		Wife of NASCAR founder Bill France Sr. First secretary/treasurer of NASCAR; Secretary/treasurer of International Speedway Corporation
2016	Harold Brasington		Founder and builder of Darlington Raceway and North Carolina Speedway (now Rockingham Speedway)
2017	H. Clay Earles		Founder and builder of Martinsville Speedway
2018	Jim France		International Speedway Corporation executive Founder of Grand-Am Road Racing and was instrumental in its merger with the American Le Mans Series; NASCAR Chairman and CEO (2019–present)
2019	Jim Hunter		Writer for the Columbia Record, Atlanta Journal-Constitution and Stock Car Racing Magazine; PR director for Darlington Raceway and Talladega Superspeedway; NASCAR Vice President of Administration; President of Darlington Raceway and Corporate VP of International Speedway Corporation; NASCAR VP of Corporate Communications
2020	Edsel Ford II		Ford Motor Company executive
2021	Ralph Seagraves		R. J. Reynolds Tobacco Company executive who helped bring Winston as the Cup Series title sponsor and promote their brand in the following years
The award was not given out in 2022 due to the COVID-19 pandemic postponing the induction ceremony of the 2021 recipient.
2023	Mike Helton		General manager of Atlanta International Raceway (now Atlanta Motor Speedway); General manager and president of Talladega Superspeedway; NASCAR Vice President of Competition (1994–1999); NASCAR Vice President and COO (1999–2000); NASCAR President (2000–2015); NASCAR Vice Chairman (2015–present)
2024	Janet Guthrie		First woman to compete in a NASCAR Cup Series superspeedway race First woman to lead a lap in a NASCAR Cup Series race Best finish in a Cup Series race by a woman (6th, tied with Danica Patrick)
2025	Dean Sicking		Inventor of the SAFER barrier
2026	Humpy Wheeler		General Manager of Charlotte Motor Speedway (1975-2008)
