= Dean Sicking =

American inventor and safety researcher (born 1957)

- Born: October 15, 1957 (age 68); Muenster, Texas, U.S
- Education: Texas A&M University
- Known for: Invention of the SAFER barrier, the first energy absorbing guardrail terminal, and other highway and racing safety advancements
- Awards: National Medal of Technology and Innovation (2005) Pioneering and Innovation Award from Autosport Awards (2004); Ken Stonex Award (2011); National Academy of Inventors Charter Fellow (2012) NASCAR Hall of Fame Landmark Award (2025)

Dean L. Sicking (born October 15, 1957) is an American inventor and safety researcher.

== Early life and education ==
Born in Muenster, Texas, Sicking received his bachelor of science degree in mechanical rngineering and master of science and doctorate of philosophy degrees in civil Engineering from Texas A&M.

== Career ==
=== Inventions ===
Sicking holds 30 patents, the five most significant of which are the first energy-absorbing guardrail terminal, the first crash cushion without sacrificial energy absorbents, the first guardrail capable of containing large SUV's, a trailer-mounted impact attenuator, and NASCAR's SAFER barrier. These technologies have revolutionized their respective markets. They have been adopted around the globe and produced major reductions in the number of serious injuries and fatalities along highways and race tracks.

Sicking has been principal or co-principal investigator on research projects with total extramural funding in excess of $30 million. He has authored or co-authored more than 200 technical reports, more than 70 refereed journal papers and seven books.

==== Energy-absorbing guardrail terminals ====
Sicking has designed impact energy management systems, specifically focusing on crashworthy safety systems. He has developed numerous "next generation" designs that have significantly reduced the risk of injury and fatality to motorists, from highway drivers to NASCAR racers. His first was the ET-2000, the first energy-absorbing guardrail terminal – a device that sits over the end of a guardrail, flattening the guardrail when it is hit by a vehicle. The first study of the device showed that out of 400 crashes, three injuries and no fatalities resulted — reducing the incidence by a factor of 10.

==== SAFER barrier ====
Following Dale Earnhardt's fatal wreck in 2001, NASCAR commissioned Sicking to determine the specific cause of Earnhardt's worst injuries. Sicking used video footage to analyze and reconstruct the crash, as well as NASCAR's worst crashes over the 10 years prior. Ultimately, the investigation contributed to the development of Sicking's invention, the SAFER barrier, an energy-management system that reduces the impact felt by the driver by flexing and absorbing energy. Prior to the barrier, NASCAR and IndyCar averaged about 1.5 driver fatalities yearly. Since the SAFER barrier's implementation in 2004, no fatalities or serious injuries associated with SAFER barrier impacts have occurred. In fact, the only remotely serious injury sustained has been a broken sternum. The magnitude of the impact of Sicking's technologies is best illustrated by driver comments about the SAFER barrier.

==== Performance standards ====
Sicking was second author of the Standards for Roadside Safety adopted in 1993 and principal author of the Manual for Assessing Safety Hardware, adopted by the Federal Highway Administration in 2010.

=== Sports safety research ===
Sicking designed a helmet that is more flexible and can decouple head rotation from helmet rotation, thus reducing peak Gs on the head.

=== Awards and positions ===
Sicking was elected a charter fellow of the National Academy of Inventors, and President George W. Bush awarded him the 2005 National Medal of Technology and Innovation, which is the highest honor that the United States can bestow on a citizen whose technologies have made a positive contribution to the welfare of the nation. Sicking's efforts have also won him the first-awarded Pioneering and Innovation Award in the history of Auto Sport magazine, in 2004, for his work on the SAFER barrier. He has also received the 2011 Ken Stonex Award, presented by the Transportation Research Board Committee on Roadside Safety Design, in recognition of a lifetime of achievement in crashworthiness design. The Texas Motorsports Hall of Fame awarded Sicking the 2005 Vision Award for his contributions to racing safety, and individual raceways have honored him with their awards, including NASCAR's 2003 Bill France Jr. Award for Excellence. Pocono Raceway's 2004 Bill France Award of Excellence, Indianapolis Motor Speedway's Herb Porter Award in 2004, and the 2002 Motorsports Engineering Award from the Society of Automotive Engineers and the Specialty Equipment Market Association. Sicking was also awarded with the Landmark Award as part of the 2025 NASCAR Hall of Fame Class for the work on the SAFER barrier and saving the lives of countless drivers across many racing series.

Sicking is associate vice president for Commercialization and Product Development at the University of Alabama at Birmingham. He formerly served as director of the Midwest Roadside Safety Facility, when he developed the SAFER barrier.
