= Midwest Roadside Safety Facility =

Research center at the University of Nebraska–Lincoln

Agency overview
- Formed: 1974; 52 years ago
- Type: Crash test facility
- Headquarters: 2200 Vine Street; Lincoln, Nebraska; 40.8596°N 96.7701°W
- Employees: 47 (2025)
- Agency executive: Ronald Faller, Director
- Parent agency: University of Nebraska–Lincoln
- Website: http://mwrsf.unl.edu

The Midwest Roadside Safety Facility (Midwest or MwRSF) is a research organization in Lincoln, Nebraska that conducts automotive crash testing. MwRSF is operated by the University of Nebraska–Lincoln and researches highway design and safety, with a particular emphasis on safety performance evaluations of roadside appurtenances. Since its establishment in 1974, the facility has evaluated existing barriers and developed new design concepts and technologies for use on public roadways.

MwRSF engineers designed and tested the SAFER barrier, an energy-absorbing "soft wall" system installed at all high-speed oval race tracks used by NASCAR and IndyCar.

== History ==
Roadside safety research at the University of Nebraska–Lincoln began in 1974, when Edward Post left the Texas A&M Transportation Institute and joined the Civil Engineering department at NU. In its early years, Post's research organization included a handful of graduate students and was primarily funded by the Nebraska Department of Roads (now the Nebraska Department of Transportation). As more state agencies and the Federal Highway Administration began supporting the program, it formally became the Midwest Roadside Safety Facility and began hiring full-time employees. When Post died in 1991, MwRSF hired Dean Sicking, also from TTI, to lead the program. Sicking served as director until 2012, when he accepted a teaching position at the University of Alabama at Birmingham; longtime MwRSF engineer Ronald Faller was named program director upon Sicking's departure.

MwRSF has worked on hundreds of roadside safety projects since its inception, many of which are used on highways nationwide. These include the SKT, FLEAT, and BEAT energy-absorbing guardrail end terminals; many variations of W-beam and thrie-beam guardrails, including the complete design and development of the Midwest Guardrail System; and the SAFER barrier. The facility receives funding from the National Cooperative Highway Research Program and frequently presents at the Transportation Research Board Annual Meeting.

Though it is headquartered at the Prem S. Paul Research Center just east of NU's City Campus, MwRSF uses an approximately quarter-mile stretch of runway at the Lincoln Airport to conduct crash tests. In 2021, MwRSF tested an 80,000-lb tank truck at fifty miles per hour impacting a sixty-two inch tall constant-slope concrete barrier; because of the immense costs associated, this was the first test of its kind in over thirty years. The barrier was believed to be a suitable replacement for the much larger and costlier ninety-inch barrier used as standard to divide highways and prevent large trucks from encroaching into oncoming lanes.

=== Pooled Fund ===
The University of Nebraska–Lincoln and NDOT, along with the Kansas Department of Transportation and Missouri Department of Transportation, formed the Midwest States Regional Pooled Fund Program in 1991; the Iowa Department of Transportation and Minnesota Department of Transportation joined soon after. The Pooled Fund was created as a way for states with similar geographic layouts to combine resources and optimize roadside safety research efforts. The program has since expanded to include twenty-one states from across the country. In 2021, the Pooled Fund received $1.235 million in funding from its member departments of transportation and completed twelve projects, including compliance testing for the American Association of State Highway and Transportation Officials.

== SAFER barrier ==
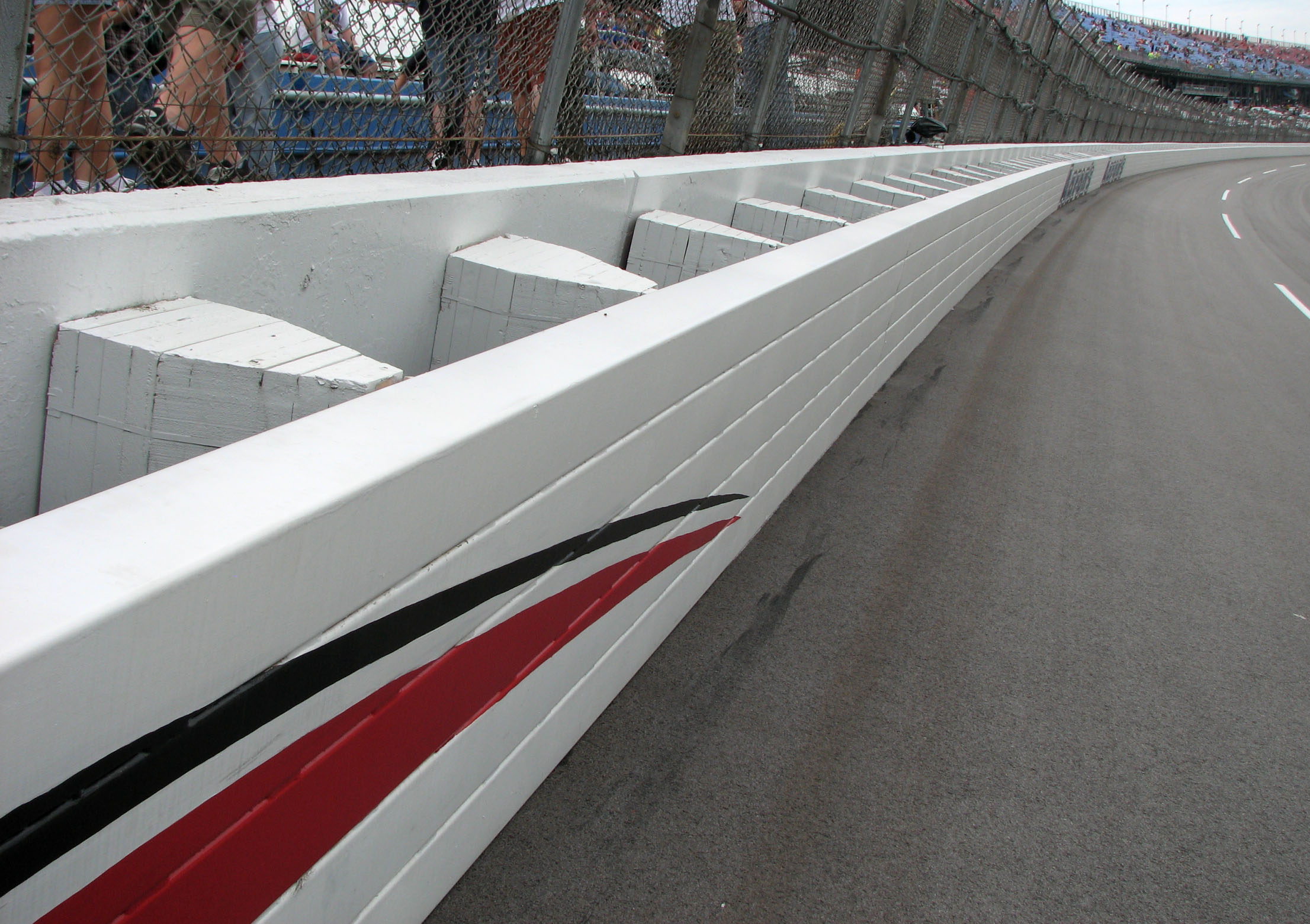
A SAFER barrier installation at Talladega Superspeedway

In 1998, MwRSF was contracted by NASCAR, the Indy Racing League (now IndyCar), and the Indianapolis Motor Speedway to develop an energy-absorbing, partially deformable "soft wall" to mitigate the forces involved with high-speed wall impacts. MwRSF engineers tested nearly one hundred materials for optimal effectiveness, cost, and replaceability before settling on Owens Corning FOAMULAR as the primary energy-absorbing mechanism in the barrier. The closed-cell, polystyrene foam was used to partially fill the thirty-inch gap between the existing concrete wall and the steel face of the barrier. During the design and testing of the new barrier, a number of high-profile deaths in NASCAR involving wall impacts, including that of Dale Earnhardt, dramatically increased scrutiny of the United States' most popular racing organization and its efforts to protect drivers.

The system was officially named the Steel And Foam Energy Reduction Barrier (abbreviated to "SAFER" barrier); it was first installed at Indianapolis Motor Speedway in 2002. It was soon implemented in some capacity at every high-speed oval race track used by NASCAR and IndyCar, and there have been no subsequent driver fatalities in any of NASCAR's top-flight series (the Cup Series, Grand National Series, and Truck Series). Many racing stars, notably Jeff Gordon, have praised the inertia-dampening performance of the SAFER barrier; Gordon suggested "SAFER barriers should be on every wall, every track."

MwRSF engineers Ronald Faller, Jim Holloway, John Reid, John Rohde, and Dean Sicking were presented with the Louis H. Schwitzer Award for Engineering Innovation and Excellence at the 2002 Indianapolis 500 in recognition of their development of the SAFER barrier.
