= DieHard (brand) =

Automotive parts brand

- Product type: Automobile batteries
- Current owner: Sears, Roebuck & Company (1967–2004); Sears Holdings (2004–2018); Transformco (2018–2019); Advance Auto Parts (2019–present)
- Country: USA
- Introduced: 1967; 59 years ago
- Website: diehard.com

DieHard is an American brand of automotive batteries and other auto parts owned by Advance Auto Parts that is sold at Advance and Carquest stores. Other DieHard-branded merchandise such as tools and boots are sold at these stores and/or other stores such as Sears and Kmart. Advance bought the DieHard brand from Sears in December 2019.

The brand dates to 1967, having been developed by Globe-Union Battery for Sears. Globe-Union was later bought out by Johnson Controls, who continued to manufacture the DieHard for Sears.

In 2019, Johnson Controls spun off its battery division into Clarios, LLC, which manufactures the DieHard brand, along with Duralast, Varta, and ACDelco, as well as 20 other brands, and sold Clarios to Brookfield Business Partners. For a time, DieHard batteries were also manufactured by Exide. In March 2001, Exide pleaded guilty to fraud conspiracy charges and agreed to pay a fine of $27.5 million to end a federal criminal investigation into auto-battery sales to customers of Sears, Roebuck & Company. The case arose from investigations and accusations that Exide conspired with Sears to sell used batteries as new to Sears customers and that Exide officials had paid bribes to conceal the fraud. DieHard battery manufacturing afterward returned to Johnson Controls.

The DieHard brand is also used on hand tools, power tools, battery chargers, booster cables, power inverters, alkaline batteries, tires, work boots, and the batteries for Craftsman power tools. Battery chargers were initially made by Associated Equipment under the "608" model prefix, and then later Schumacher Electric under the "200" model prefix.

In 2017, Sears launched a pilot location in San Antonio for a DieHard-branded auto service franchise, DieHard Auto Center Driven by Sears Auto. The intent was to operate standalone versions of the Sears Auto Center locations attached to Sears department stores; the location was chosen because it was in proximity to a Sears location that had closed. Sears opened another location at Oakland Mall in Troy, Michigan.

In 2018, parent company Sears filed for Chapter 11 bankruptcy. On December 23, 2019, Advance Auto Parts announced that it had bought the DieHard brand for $200 million.

== See also ==
- Sears XDH-1
