= International Motorsports Hall of Fame =

Hall of fame in Talladega, Alabama

Coordinates: 33.578°N 86.072°W

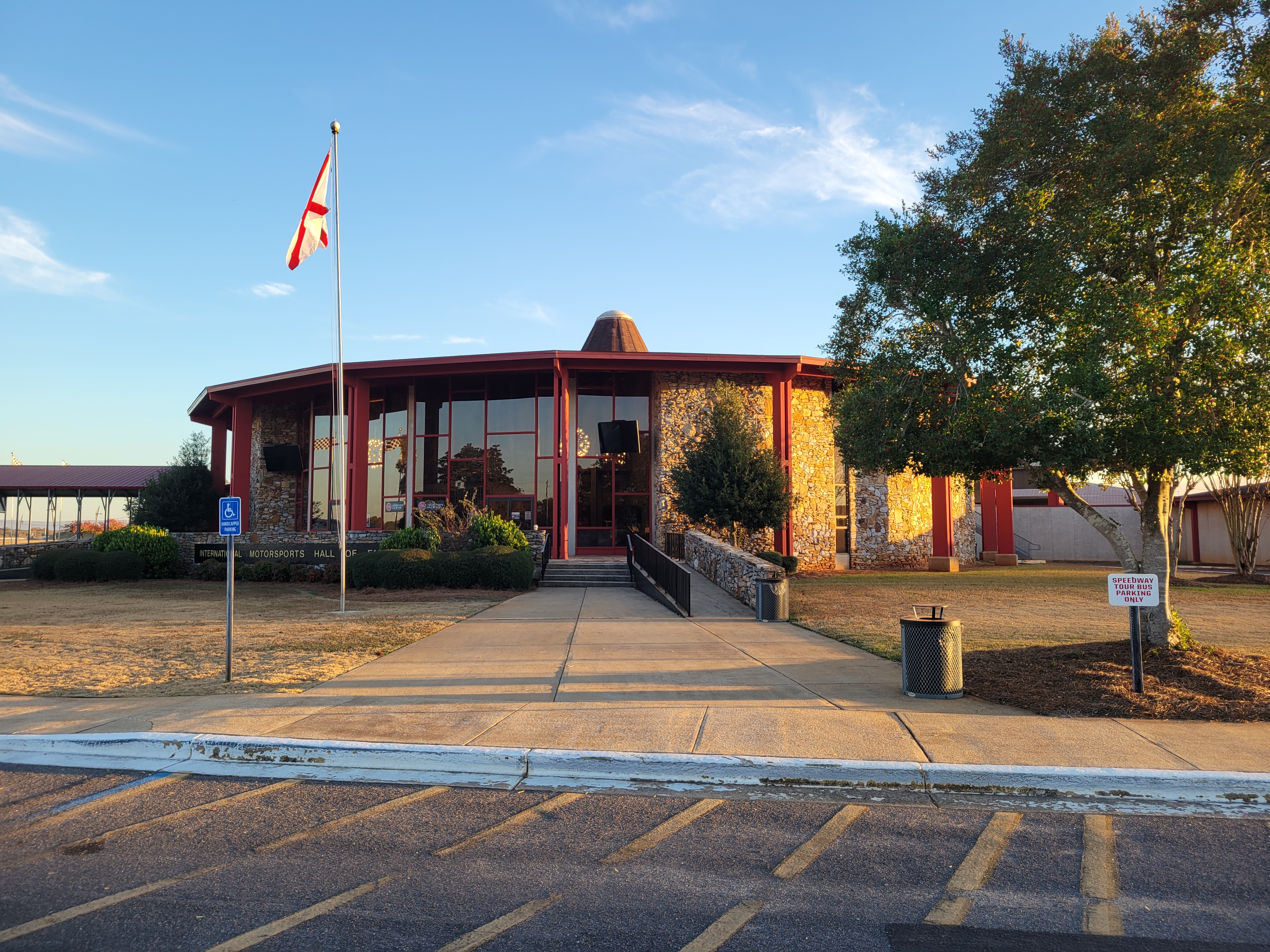
- The exterior of the International Motorsports Hall of Fame in 2025
- Established: 1983
- Location: Talladega, Alabama, United States
- Type: Motorsports hall of fame and museum
- Founder: Bill France Sr.
- Website: motorsportshalloffame

The International Motorsports Hall of Fame (IMHOF) is a hall of fame located adjacent to the 2.66 mi (4.28 km) Talladega Superspeedway (formerly Alabama International Motor Speedway) located in Talladega County, east central Alabama. It enshrines those who have contributed the most to motorsports either as a developer, driver, engineer, or owner.

== History ==
=== 20th century ===
The IMHOF was established in early 1970 following NASCAR founder Bill France Sr.'s decision to hire short track racing promoter Don Naman to build a museum and hall of fame in order "to preserve the history of motorsports and to enshrine forever the people who have been responsible for its growth." George Wallace, the Governor of Alabama, formed an 18-member observer commission in 1975 to choose a site and select a design. Following the failure to pass a state-wide referendum on a state bond finance distribution to build the IMHOF, France donated 35 acres (14 ha) of land from former race car driver Johnny Ray's family. France opted to build the IMHOF in Alabama rather than in his hometown of Daytona Beach, Florida because Floridian politicians threatened to levy a tax on Daytona International Speedway.

Construction was undertaken with private and federal funding released with new Alabama governor Fob James' approval. The first phase of construction consisted of the building of three of the first six planned buildings on the IMHOF. A groundbreaking ceremony occurred at the site on the afternoon of March 26, 1981, with approximately 100 individuals such as Wallace, Bill France Sr., and Bill France Jr. present. The first half was opened on April 28, 1983, and the second half on July 28, 1990. Track owners International Speedway Corporation (ISC) rented office space from Alabama to run the IMHOF. It has a museum containing racing vehicles, banner, helmet, medals, posters and trophy displays, the ISC offices, and ancillary spaces. The Alabama Sports Writers Hall of Fame; the Automobile Racing Club of America Hall of National Champions; the International Motorsports Hall of Fame; the Quarter Midgets of America Hall of Fame; the Western Auto Mechanics Hall of Fame; and the World Karting Hall of Fame are the six halls of fame on-site. The McCaig-Wellborn International Motorsports Research Library is also contained in the IMHOF.

Naman had been appointed IMHOF director in 1988, and he began setting out his objective to establish a working hall of fame. The first induction ceremony was broadcast live on The Nashville Network, and was hosted by country music record artist and car sponsor T. G. Sheppard at the Birmingham–Jefferson Civic Center Theater, in Birmingham, Alabama, on the evening of July 25, 1990. Induction ceremonies were held on the Wednesday evening prior to the Winston 500 in October at Talladega before being moved to December for both 1993 and 1994. After the Speedvision Dome was opened in 1996, all subsequent induction ceremonies took place there, four days prior to the Winston Select 500 at Talladega in late April.

Individuals were nominated and voted on by a panel of between 120 and 153 international motorsport writers as well as IMHOF inductees, who selected one or two new members or "old timers" (living inductees) from the nominations list. The nominations list was formed by candidate names sent by panel members, and 20 finalists were chosen, from which all panel members cast preference votes. Until 1996, 10 or more motorsports individuals were inducted annually, before no more than 10 nominees qualified for the final ballot, and a limit of six inductees for every subsequent year was imposed. All nominees had to be retired from participating in their respective categories for at least half a decade; they could be active elsewhere in their respective series in a different capacity. Some active racers could be inducted if they were over the age limit of 61. Individuals had to wait 15 years before become eligible for induction, with a 51 percent vote share required for induction. Unlike other sports halls of fame, waivers were not granted to major racing figures to enable their induction before the five-year waiting period had elapsed.

=== 21st century ===
A total of 145 individuals were inducted during the period the hall of fame was active in most years from 1990 to 2013. The 20 inaugural members, Buck Baker, Jack Brabham, Malcolm Campbell, Jim Clark, Mark Donohue, Juan Manuel Fangio, France Sr., Graham Hill, Tony Hulman, Junior Johnson, Parnelli Jones, Stirling Moss, Barney Oldfield, Lee Petty, Fireball Roberts, Jackie Stewart, Mickey Thompson, Bobby Unser, and Smokey Yunick, were inducted in 1990. There were three women who were added to the hall of fame. In 1999, Louise Smith, a NASCAR driver during the 1940s and 1950s, became the first woman to be inducted into the hall of fame; the two other female inductees were multiple NHRA Top Fuel dragster champion Shirley Muldowney in 2004, and Janet Guthrie, who was inducted two years later. Wendell Scott, the first African American driver to win a NASCAR Cup Series event in December 1963, was the first African American to be inducted into the hall of fame in 1999. No one was added in each of 1995 and 2010 and nobody has been inducted since 2014. (Note: Nominees for the cancelled class of 2014 were Michael Andretti, Raymond Beadle, Harold Brasington, Clint Brawner, Joie Chitwood, Harvey S. Firestone, Tommy Hinnershitz, David Hobbs, Ted Horn, Connie Kalitta, Joe Leonard, Roger McCluskey, Tom McEwen, Danny Ongais, Marvin Panch, Les Richter, Troy Ruttman and Henry Segrave.)

In November 2025, Alabama governor Kay Ivey replaced all members of the IMHOF commission, after an audit found 35 issues including a misspending of $236,000 by a former employee, and four historic cars sold in an auction without authorization.

== Inductees ==
Key
†	Indicates posthumous induction

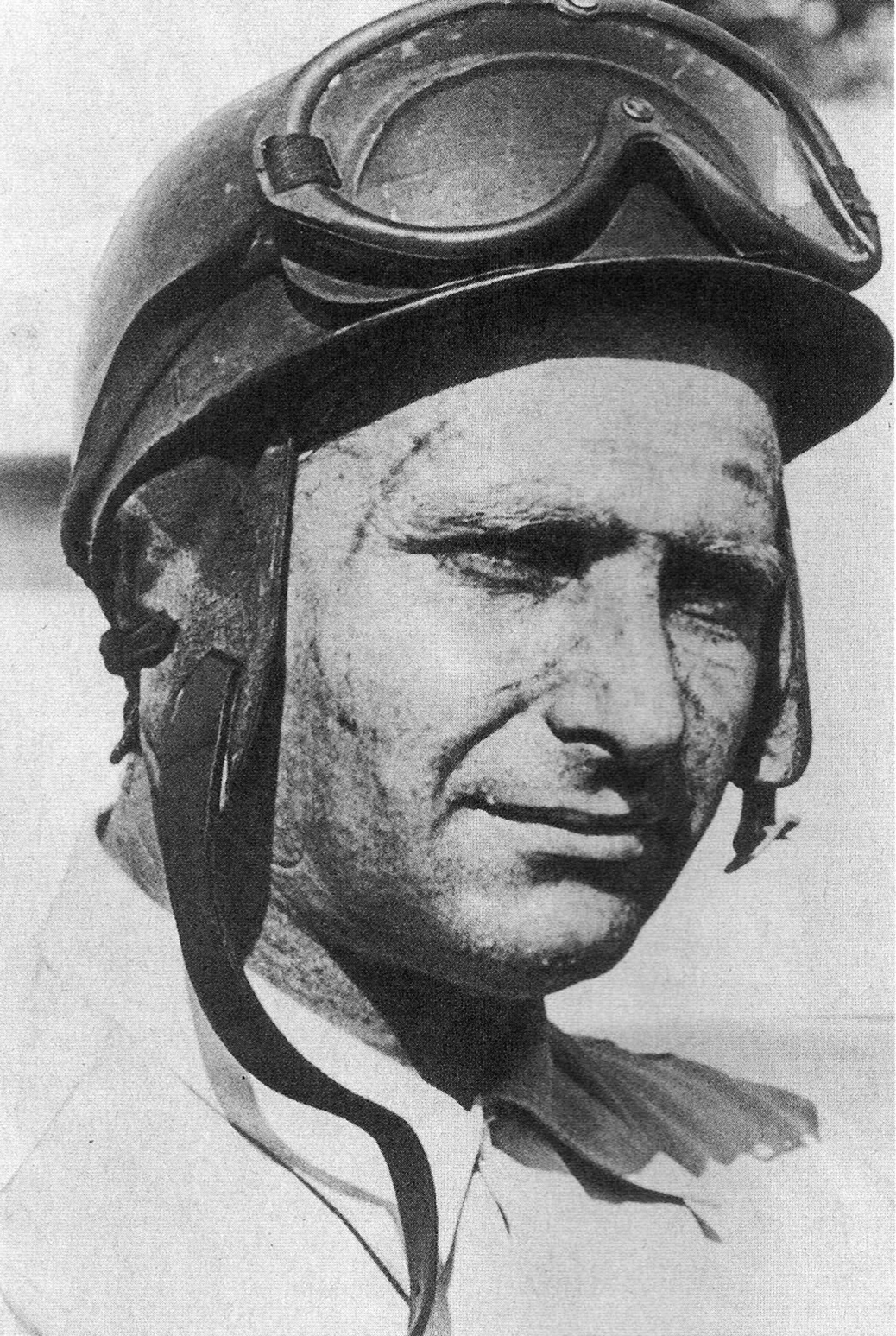
Juan Manuel Fangio, inducted in 1990

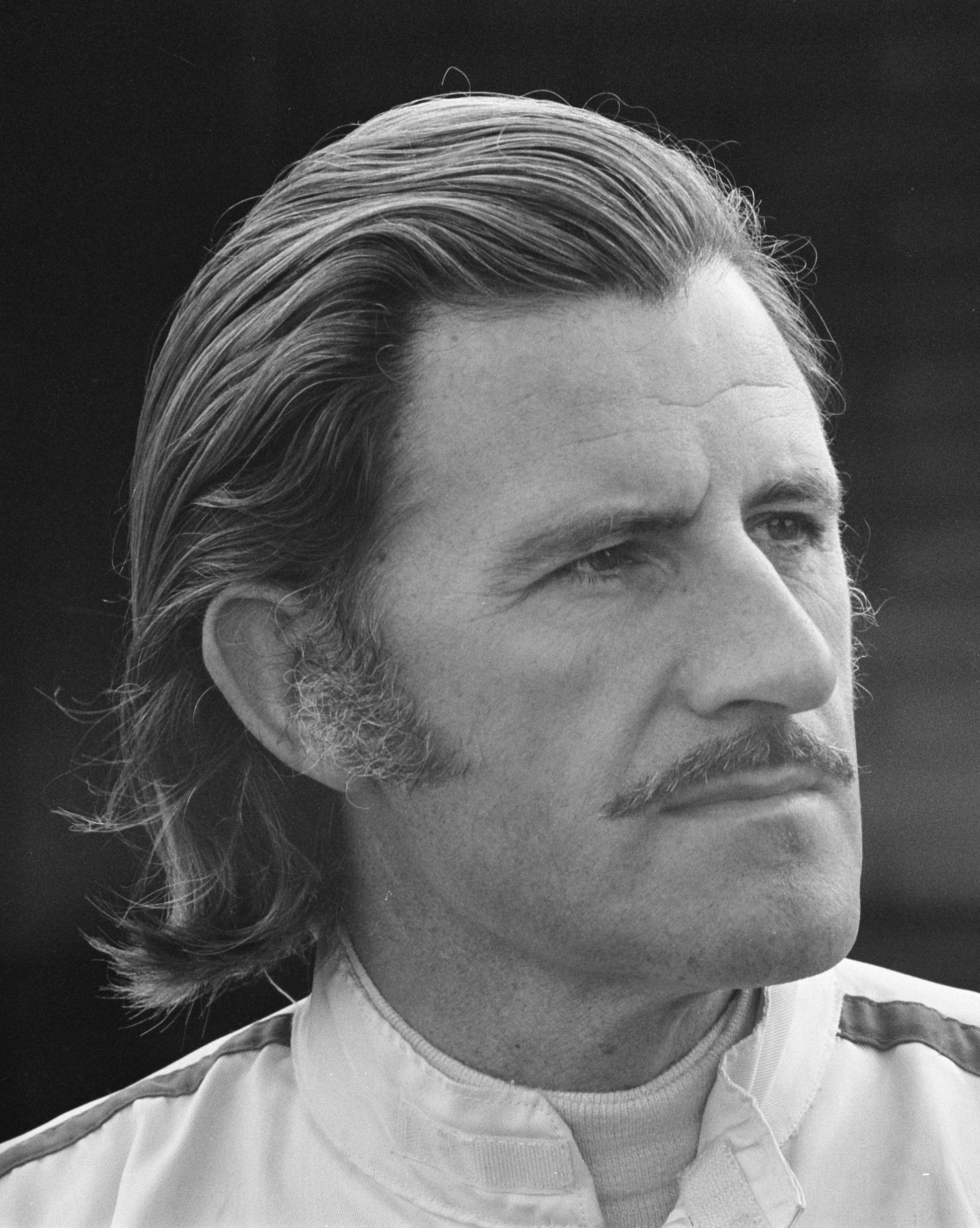
Graham Hill, inducted in 1990

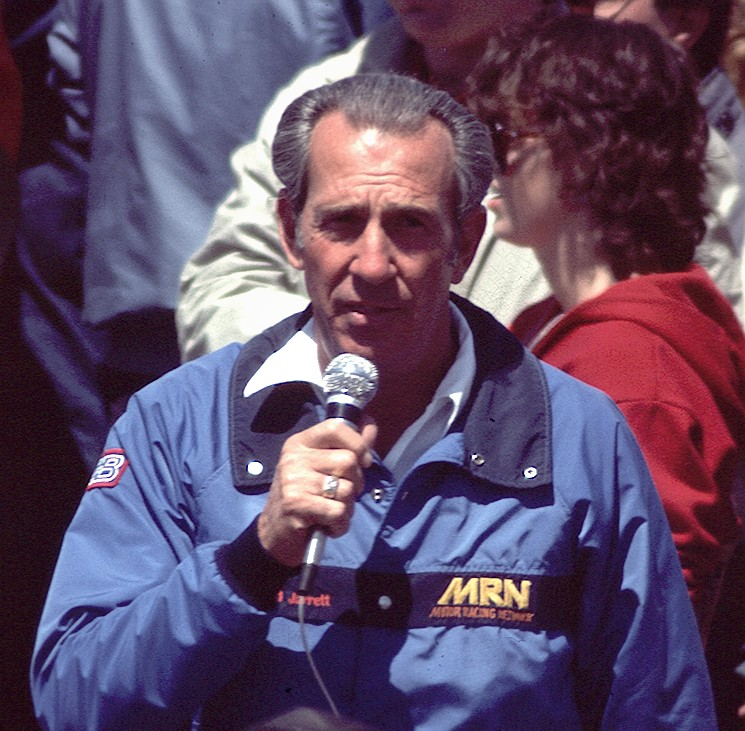
Ned Jarrett, inducted in 1991

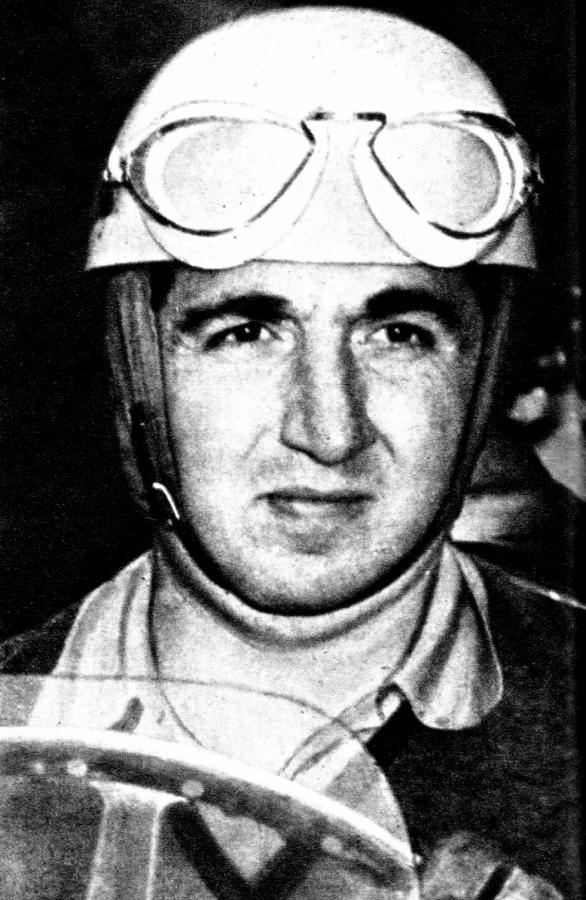
Alberto Ascari, inducted in 1992

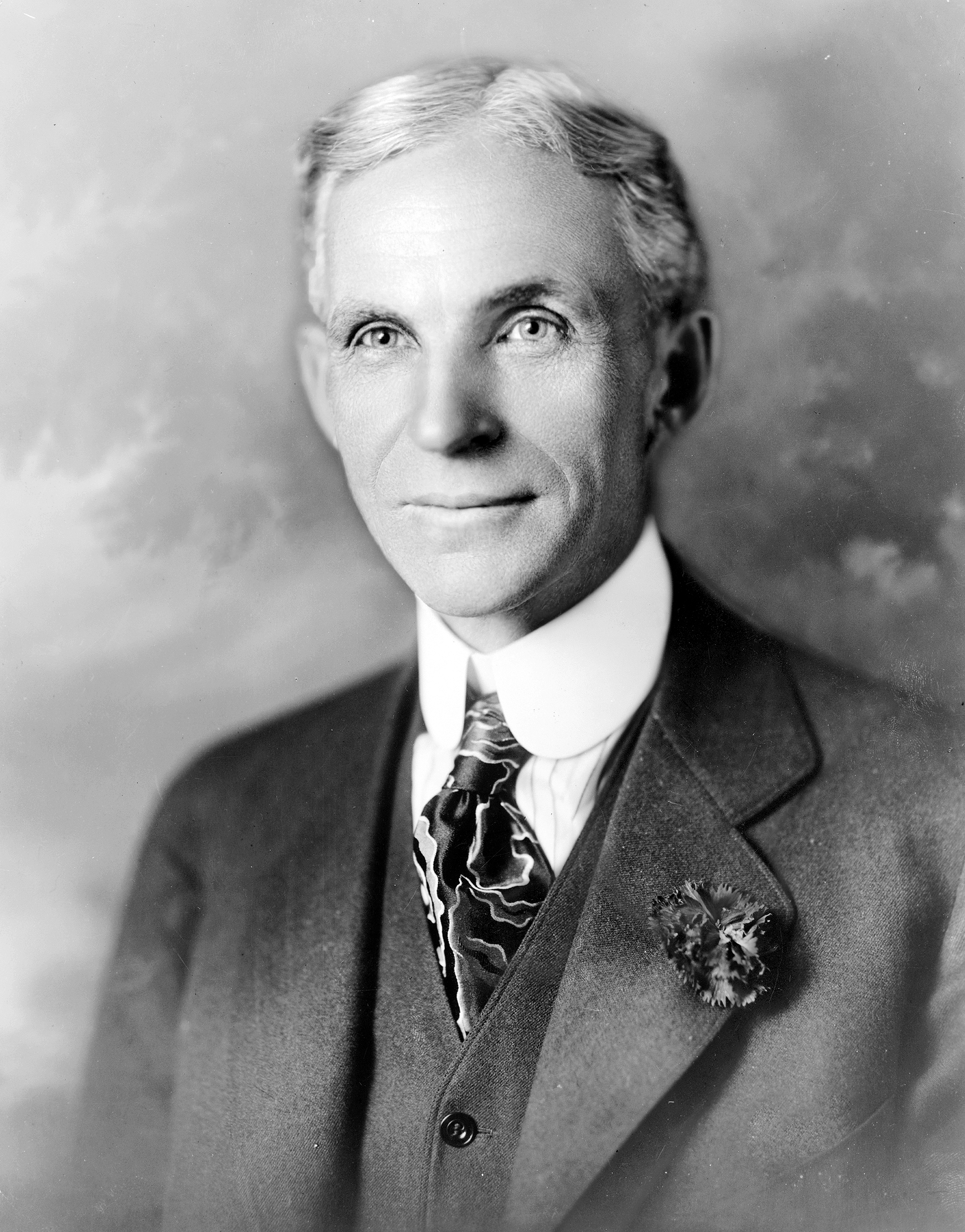
Henry Ford, inducted in 1993

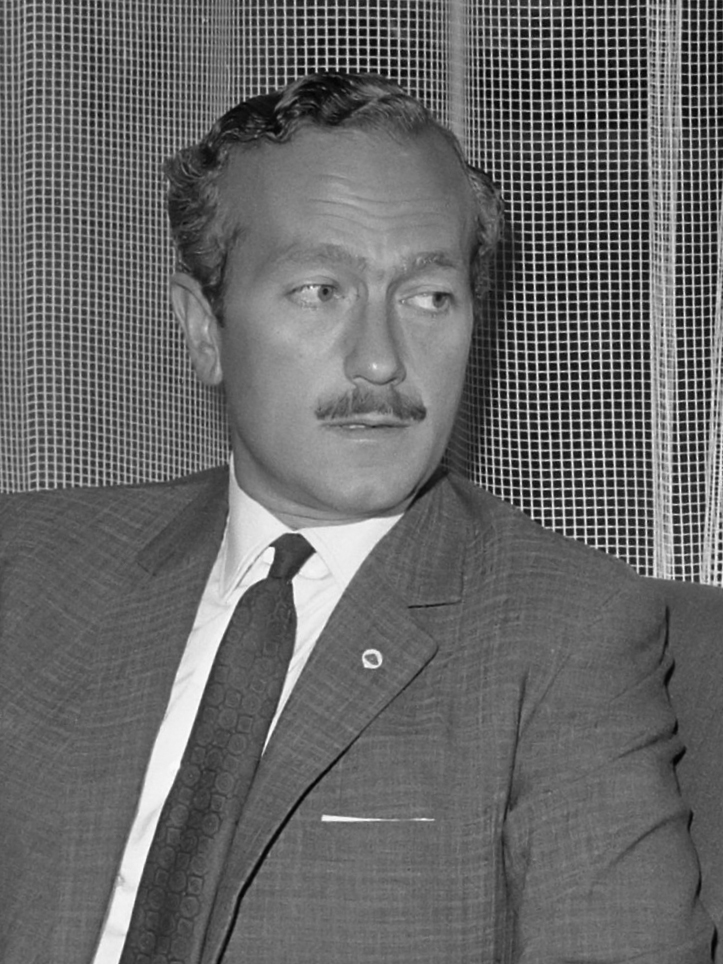
Colin Chapman, inducted in 1994

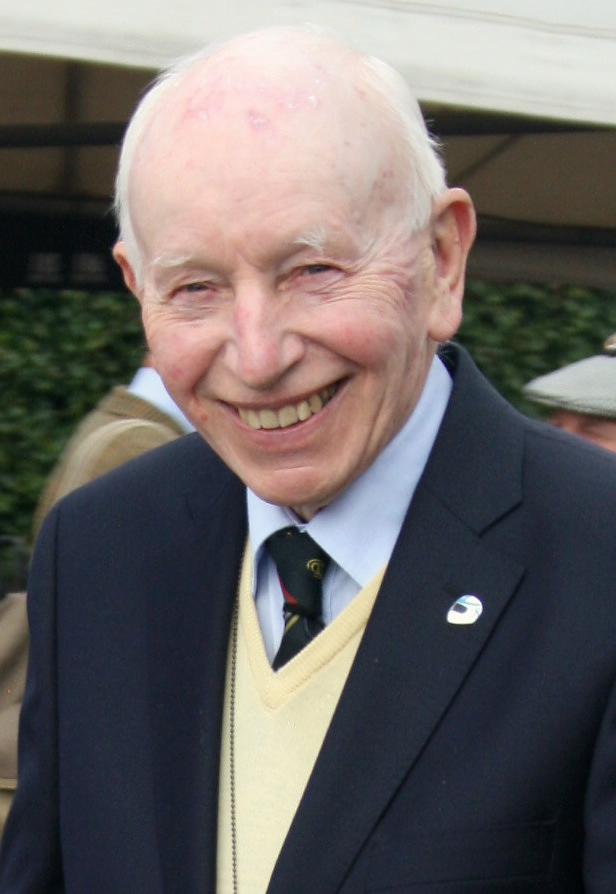
John Surtees, inducted in 1996

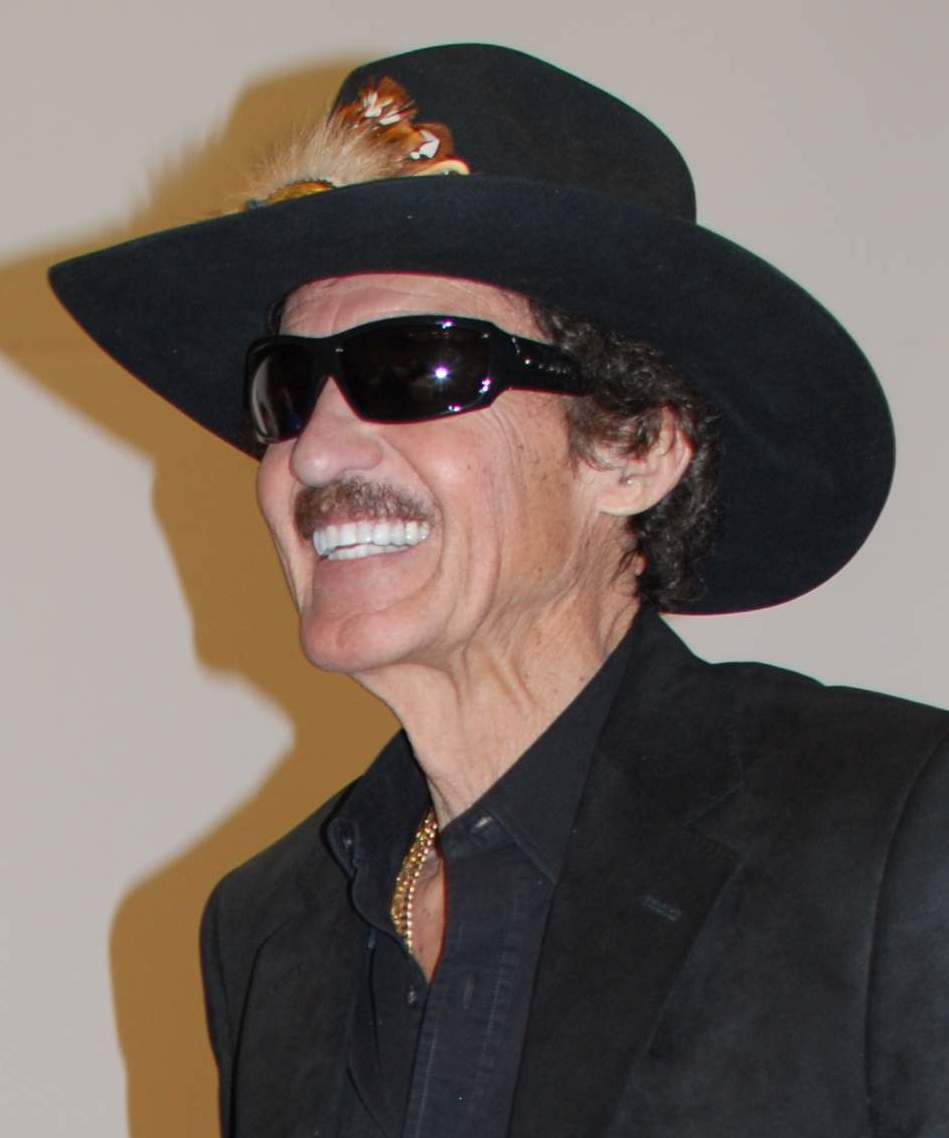
Richard Petty, inducted in 1997

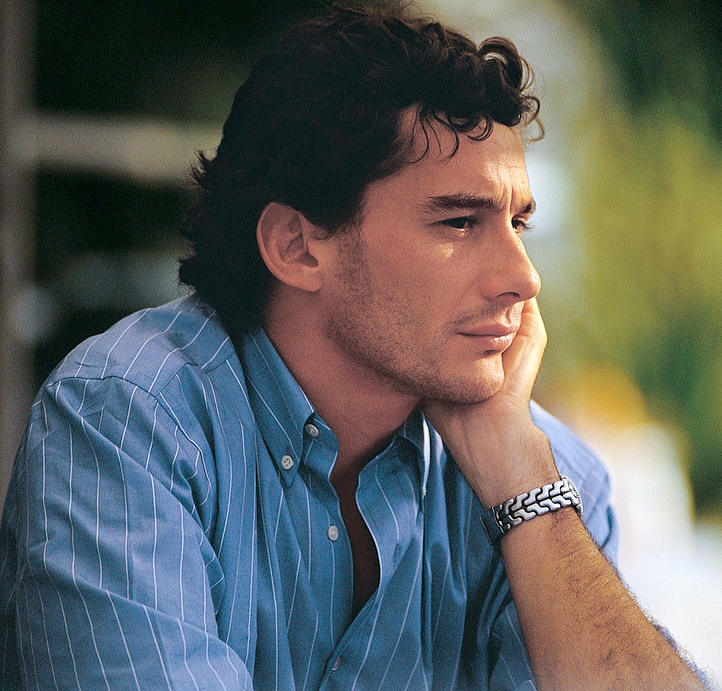
Ayrton Senna, inducted in 2000

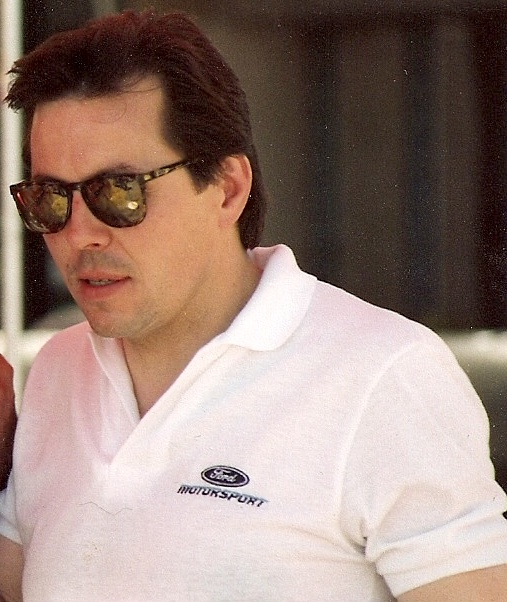
Alan Kulwicki, inducted in 2002

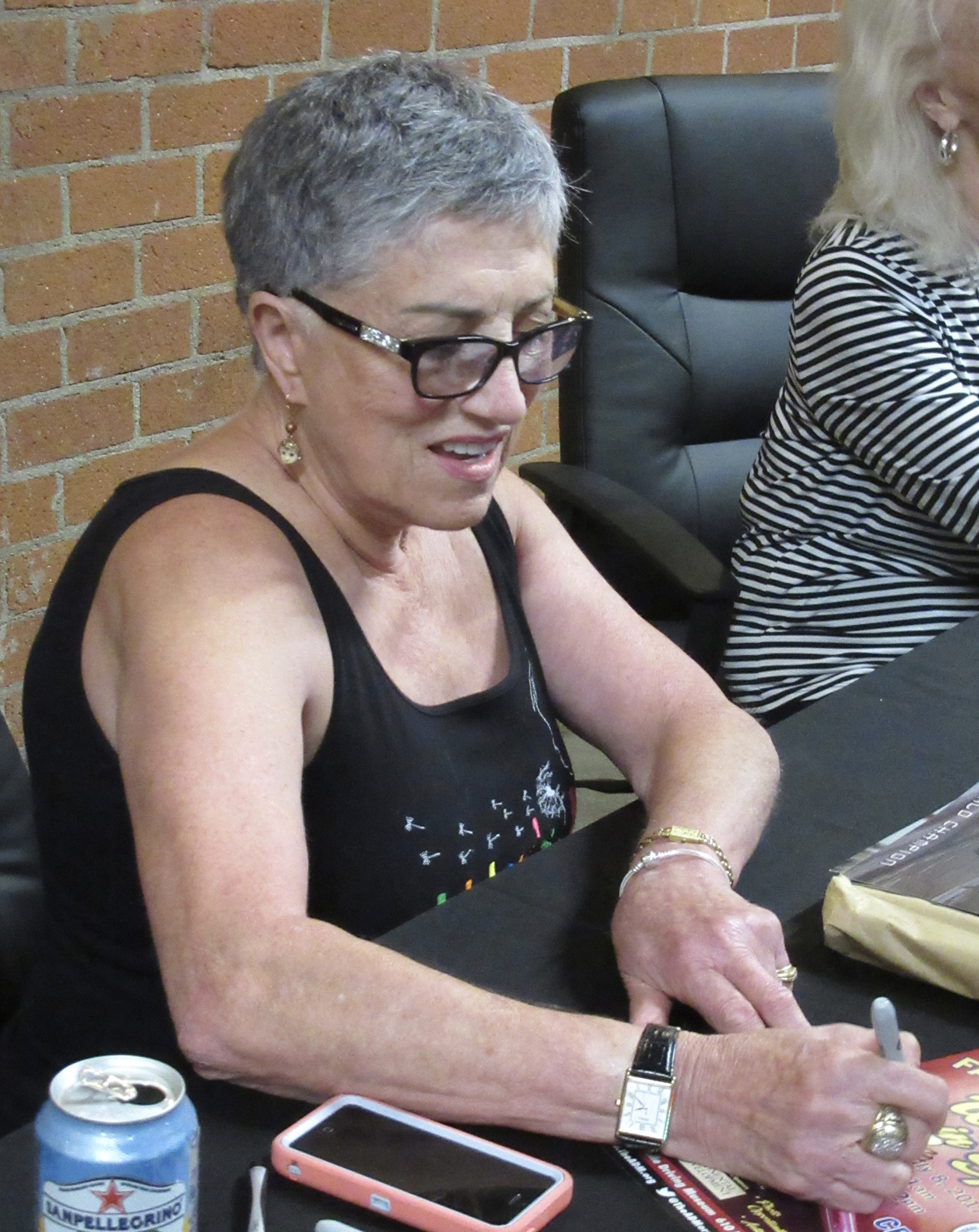
Shirley Muldowney, inducted in 2004

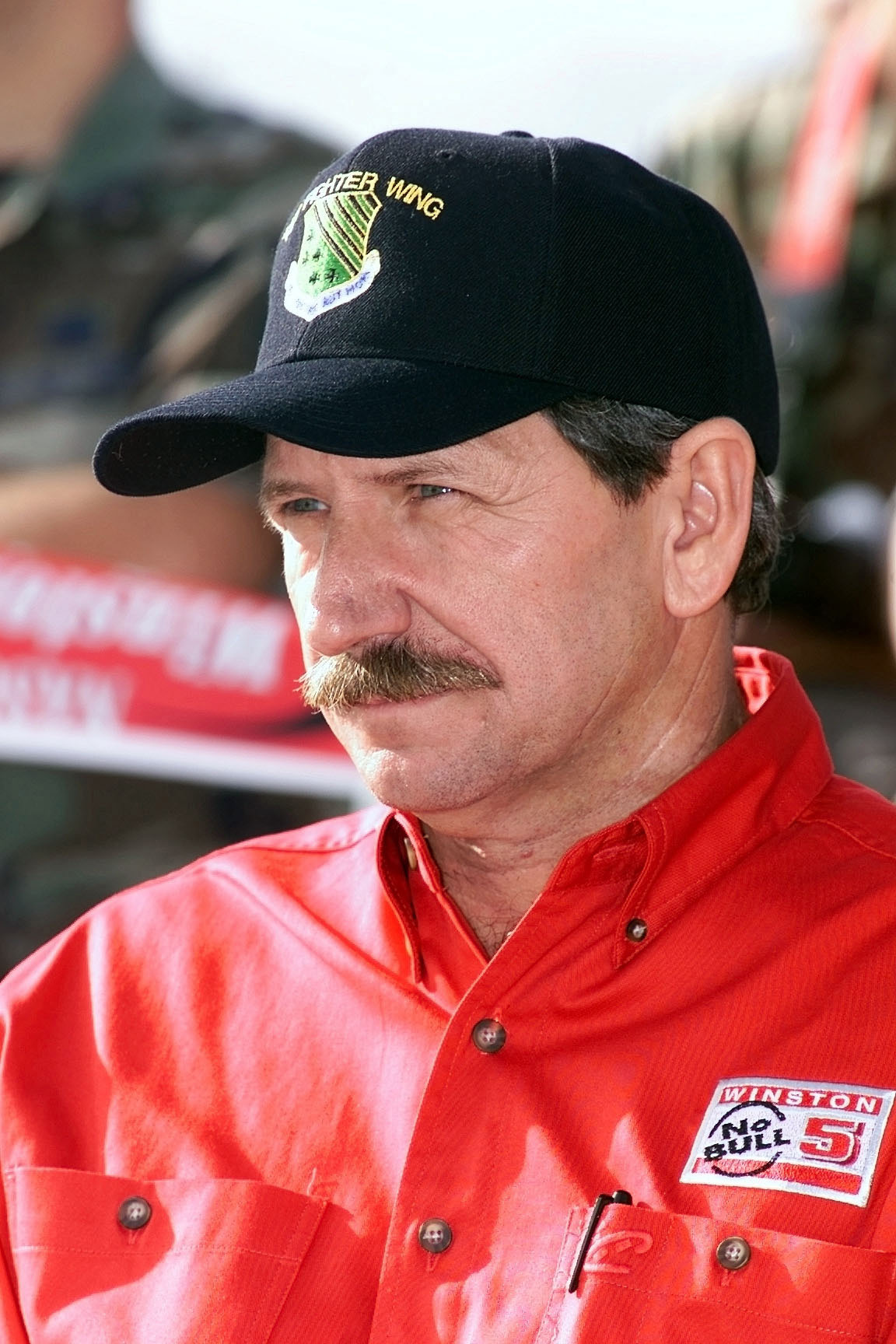
Dale Earnhardt, inducted in 2006

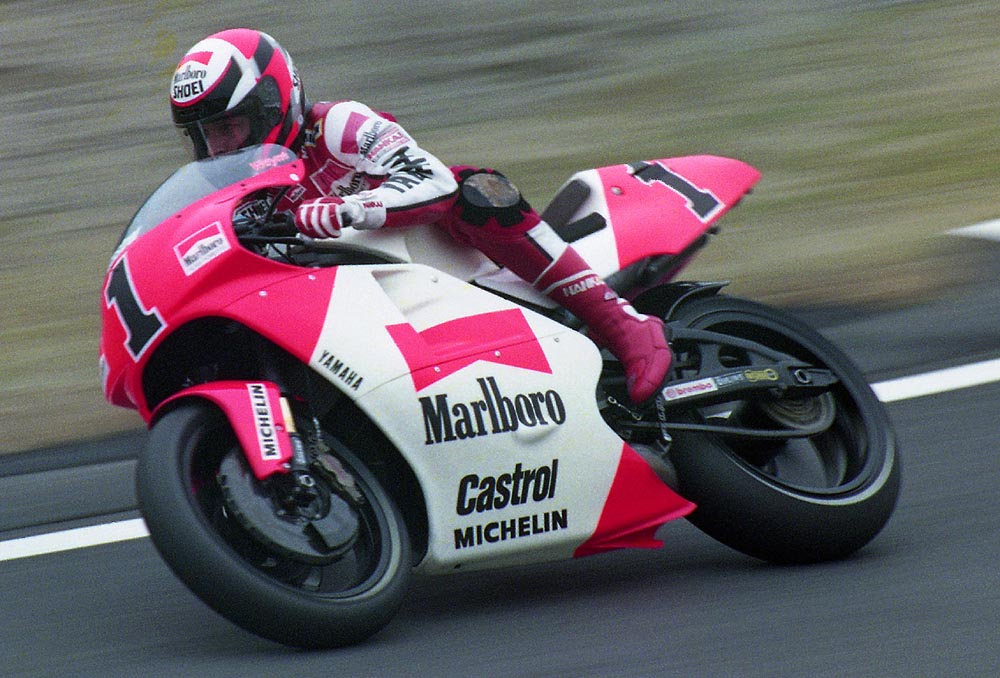
Wayne Rainey, inducted in 2007

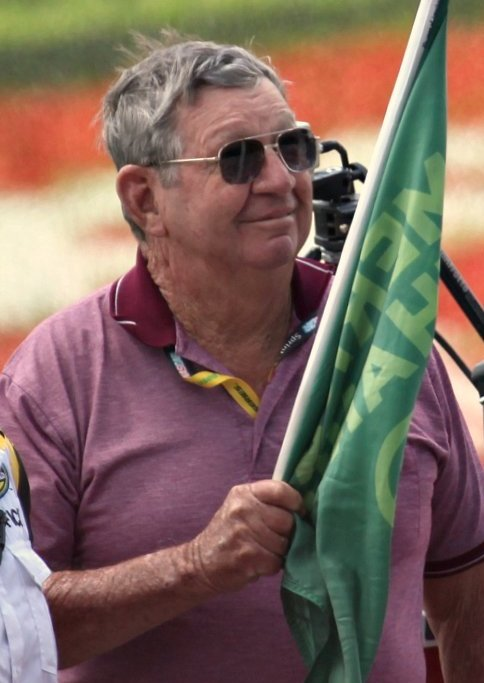
Donnie Allison, inducted in 2009

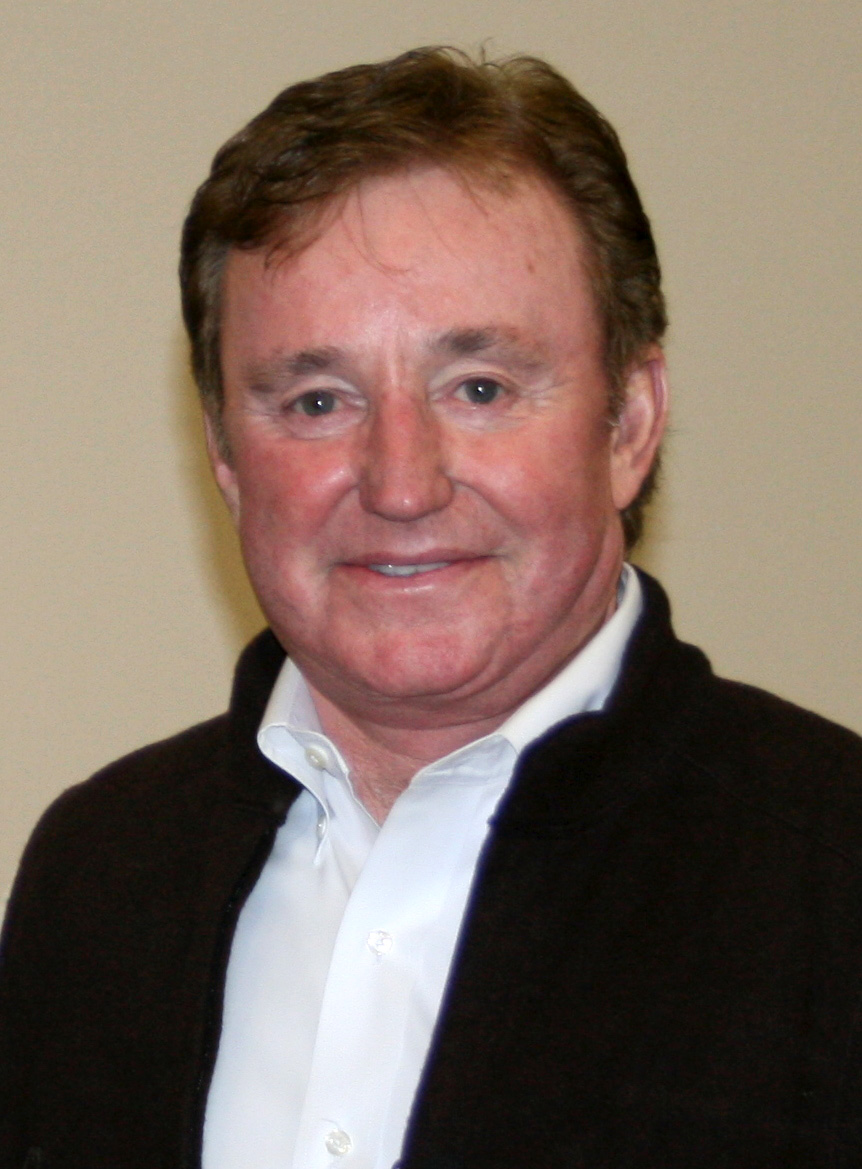
Richard Childress, inducted in 2012

Inductees of the International Motorsports Hall of Fame
Nationality	Inductee	Occupation	Year	Refs
United States	Buck Baker	Stock car driver	1990	
Australia	Jack Brabham	Open-wheel driver	1990	
United Kingdom	Malcolm Campbell †	Open-wheel driver	1990	
United Kingdom	Jim Clark †	Open-wheel driver	1990	
United States	Mark Donohue †	Open-wheel driver	1990	
Argentina	Juan Manuel Fangio	Open-wheel driver	1990	
United States	Bill France Sr.	Series executive	1990	
United States	Dan Gurney	Race car driver	1990	
United Kingdom	Graham Hill †	Race car driver	1990	
United States	Tony Hulman †	Track executive	1990	
United States	Junior Johnson	Stock car driver	1990	
United States	Parnelli Jones	Open-wheel driver	1990	
United Kingdom	Stirling Moss	Race car driver	1990	
United States	Barney Oldfield †	Open-wheel driver	1990	
United States	Lee Petty	Stock car driver	1990	
United States	Fireball Roberts †	Stock car driver	1990	
United Kingdom	Jackie Stewart	Open-wheel driver	1990	
United States	Mickey Thompson †	Vehicle builder	1990	
United States	Bobby Unser	Open-wheel driver	1990	
United States	Smokey Yunick	Car engineer	1990	
United States	Tony Bettenhausen †	Open-wheel driver	1991	
United States	Ralph DePalma †	Open-wheel driver	1991	
United States	Tim Flock	Stock car driver	1991	
United States	Phil Hill	Open-wheel driver	1991	
United States	Ned Jarrett	Open-wheel driver/Broadcaster	1991	
United States	Fred Lorenzen	Stock car driver	1991	
New Zealand	Bruce McLaren †	Car builder/Race car driver	1991	
United States	Wilbur Shaw †	Open-wheel driver	1991	
United States	Carroll Shelby	Vehicle builder	1991	
United States	Bill Vukovich †	Open-wheel driver	1991	
Italy	Alberto Ascari †	Open-wheel driver	1992	
United States	Louis Chevrolet †	Car builder/Open-wheel driver	1992	
United States	Andy Granatelli	Motorsports contributor	1992	
United States	Peter Gregg †	Sports car driver	1992	
United States	Louis Meyer †	Open-wheel driver	1992	
United States	Wally Parks	Motorsports contributor	1992	
United States	Eddie Rickenbacker	Motorsports contributor	1992	
United States	Kenny Roberts	Motorcyclist	1992	
United States	Curtis Turner †	Stock car driver	1992	
United States	Rodger Ward	Open-wheel driver	1992	
United States	Bobby Allison	Stock car driver	1993	
United States	George Bignotti	Car mechanic	1993	
United States	Henry Ford †	Car builder	1993	
United States	Al Holbert †	Sports car driver	1993	
Austria	Niki Lauda	Open-wheel driver	1993	
United States	Rex Mays †	Open-wheel driver	1993	
United States	David Pearson	Stock car driver	1993	
United States	Cale Yarborough	Stock car driver	1993	
United Kingdom	Colin Chapman †	Car builder	1994	
Italy	Enzo Ferrari †	Car builder	1994	
United States	Tiny Lund †	Stock car driver	1994	
United States	John Marcum †	Motorsports contributor	1994	
United States	Ralph Moody	Stock car driver/Car owner	1994	
United States	Benny Parsons	Stock car driver	1994	
United States	Mauri Rose †	Open-wheel racer	1994	
United States	Herb Thomas	Stock car driver	1994	
United States	Joe Weatherly †	Stock car driver	1994	
United States	Richie Evans †	Stock car driver	1996	
United Kingdom	Donald Healey †	Car builder	1996	
United States	Bobby Isaac †	Stock car driver	1996	
Germany	Ferdinand Porsche †	Car builder	1996	
United States	Johnny Rutherford	Open-wheel driver	1996	
United Kingdom	John Surtees	Open-wheel driver/Motorcyclist	1996	
United States	Buddy Baker	Stock car driver	1997	
United States	Ralph Earnhardt †	Stock car driver	1997	
United States	Don Garlits	Dragster/Automotive engineer	1997	
United States	Jim Hall	Driver/Car owner	1997	
United States	Rick Mears	Open-wheel driver	1997	
United States	Richard Petty	Stock car driver	1997	
United States	Davey Allison †	Stock car driver	1998	
Germany	Rudolf Caracciola †	Open-wheel driver	1998	
United States	Banjo Matthews †	Stock car driver	1998	
Italy	Tazio Nuvolari †	Open-wheel driver	1998	
United States	Roger Penske	Car builder	1998	
United States	Al Unser	Open-wheel driver	1998	
United States	Harry Hyde †	Crew chief	1999	
United States	Gordon Johncock	Open-wheel driver	1999	
France	Alain Prost	Open-wheel driver	1999	
United States	Wendell Scott †	Stock car driver	1999	
United States	Louise Smith	Stock car driver	1999	
United States	Mario Andretti	Race car driver	2000	
United States	Craig Breedlove	Land speed record holder	2000	
United States	A. J. Foyt	Open-wheel driver	2000	
Brazil	Nelson Piquet	Open-wheel driver	2000	
United States	Don Prudhomme	Dragster	2000	
Brazil	Ayrton Senna †	Open-wheel driver	2000	
United States	Neil Bonnett †	Stock car driver	2001	
United States	Jimmy Bryan †	Open-wheel driver	2001	
United Kingdom	Mike Hailwood †	Driver/motorcyclist	2001	
United States	Fred Offenhauser †	Car engineer	2001	
Italy	Ettore Bugatti †	Car builder	2002	
New Zealand	Denny Hulme †	Race car driver	2002	
Belgium	Jacky Ickx	Race car driver	2002	
United States	Alan Kulwicki †	Stock car driver	2002	
United States	Tim Richmond †	Race car driver	2002	
United States	Glen Wood	Car owner	2002	
United States	Briggs Cunningham	Sports car driver	2003	
Brazil	Emerson Fittipaldi	Open-wheel driver	2003	
United States	Ray Fox	Engine builder/Car owner	2003	
United States	Mel Kenyon	Midget car driver	2003	
United States	A. J. Watson	Car builder/Vehicle mechanic	2003	
United States	Red Farmer	Stock car driver	2004	
United States	Bill France Jr.	Series executive	2004	
United States	Shirley Muldowney	Dragster	2004	
United States	Bill Muncey †	Hydroplane racer	2004	
United States	Bobby Rahal	Open-wheel driver	2004	
United States	Joe Amato	Dragster	2005	
United States	Bob Glidden	Dragster	2005	
United States	Chip Hanauer	Hydroplane racer	2005	
United Kingdom	Nigel Mansell	Open-wheel driver	2005	
United States	Darrell Waltrip	Stock car driver	2005	
United States	Dale Earnhardt †	Stock car driver	2006	
United States	Harry Gant	Stock car driver	2006	
United States	Janet Guthrie	Race car driver	2006	
United States	Jack Roush	Car owner	2006	
United States	Humpy Wheeler	Race promoter	2006	
United States	Junie Donlavey	Stock car driver	2007	
United States	Ray Hendrick †	Stock car driver	2007	
United States	Jack Ingram	Stock car driver	2007	
United States	Warren Johnson	Dragster	2007	
United States	Wayne Rainey	Motorcyclist	2007	
United States	Bruton Smith	Race promoter	2007	
United States	Art Arfons †	Land speed record holder	2008	
United States	Red Byron †	Stock car driver	2008	
United States	Bill Jenkins	Dragster/Engine builder	2008	
United States	Frank Kurtis †	Vehicle designer	2008	
United States	Cotton Owens	Stock car driver	2008	
United States	Ralph Seagraves †	Motorsports contributor	2008	
United States	J. C. Agajanian †	Promoter/Car owner	2009	
United States	Donnie Allison	Stock car driver	2009	
United States	Jerry Cook	Stock car driver	2009	
United States	Bud Moore	Car owner	2009	
United States	Raymond Parks	Car owner	2009	
United States	John Holman †	Car owner	2011	
United States	Jan Opperman †	Race car driver	2011	
United States	Maurice Petty	Crew chief/Engine builder	2011	
United Kingdom	Brian Redman	Race car driver	2011	
United States	Rex White	Stock car driver	2011	
United States	Kenny Bernstein	Dragster/Car owner	2012	
United States	Richard Childress	Car owner	2012	
United States	John Force	Dragster	2012	
United States	Rick Hendrick	Car owner	2013	
United States	Dale Inman	Crew chief	2013	
United States	Don Schumacher	Dragster builder	2013	
United States	Rusty Wallace	Stock car driver	2013	

== Statistics ==
Inductees by nationality
Nationality	Inductees
United States	118
United Kingdom	11
Italy	4
Brazil	3
Germany	2
New Zealand	2
Argentina	1
Australia	1
Austria	1
Belgium	1
France	1

== See also ==
- Sears XDH-1, on display at the museum
- Long Beach Motorsports Walk of Fame
- International Drag Racing Hall of Fame
- Motorsports Hall of Fame of America
- NASCAR Hall of Fame
