= Gore (road) =

Triangular plot of land used in traffic infrastructure

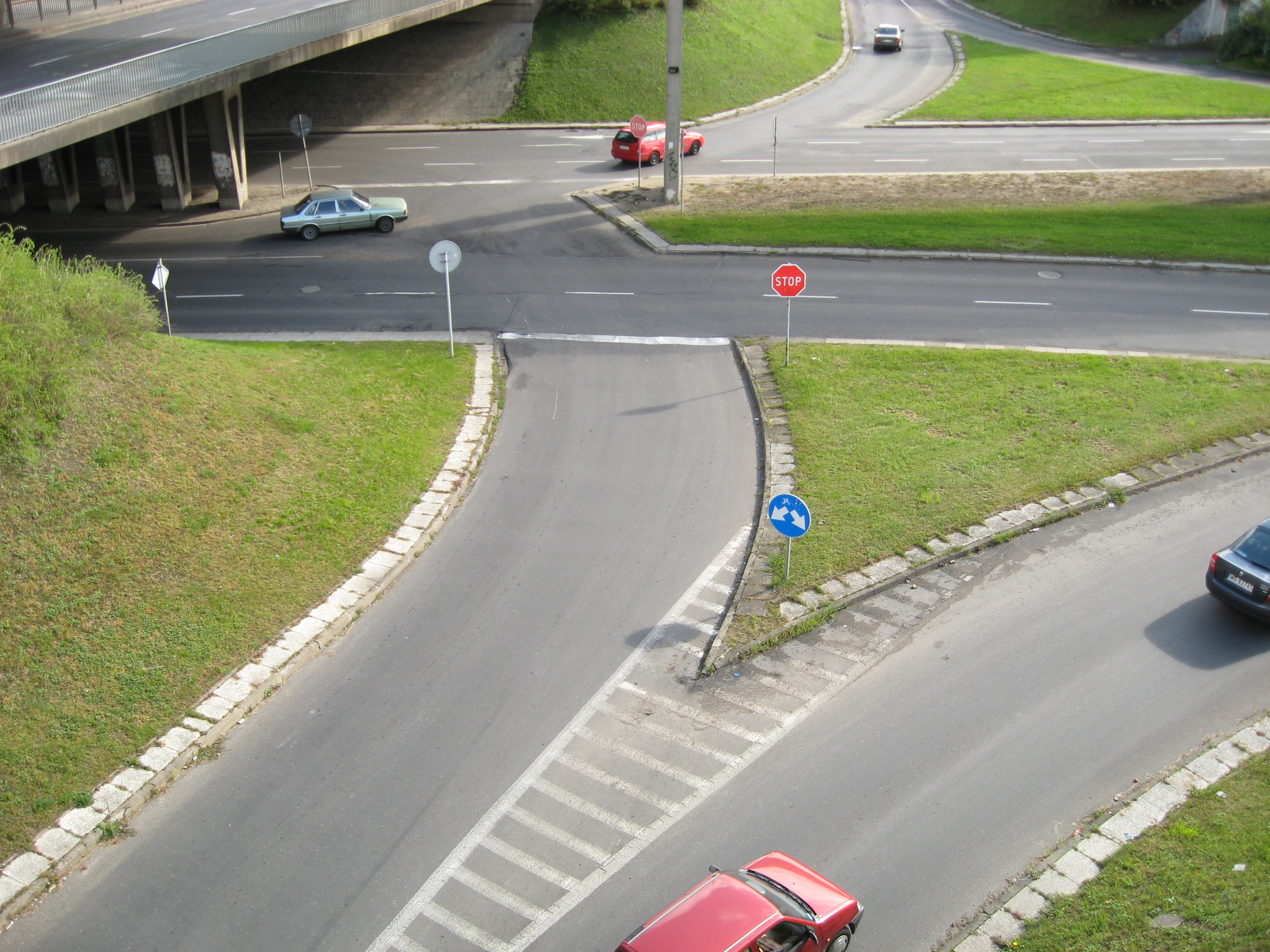
Highway exit gore in Gdańsk, Poland, with a transversely lined "theoretical gore", followed by a grass-covered physical one

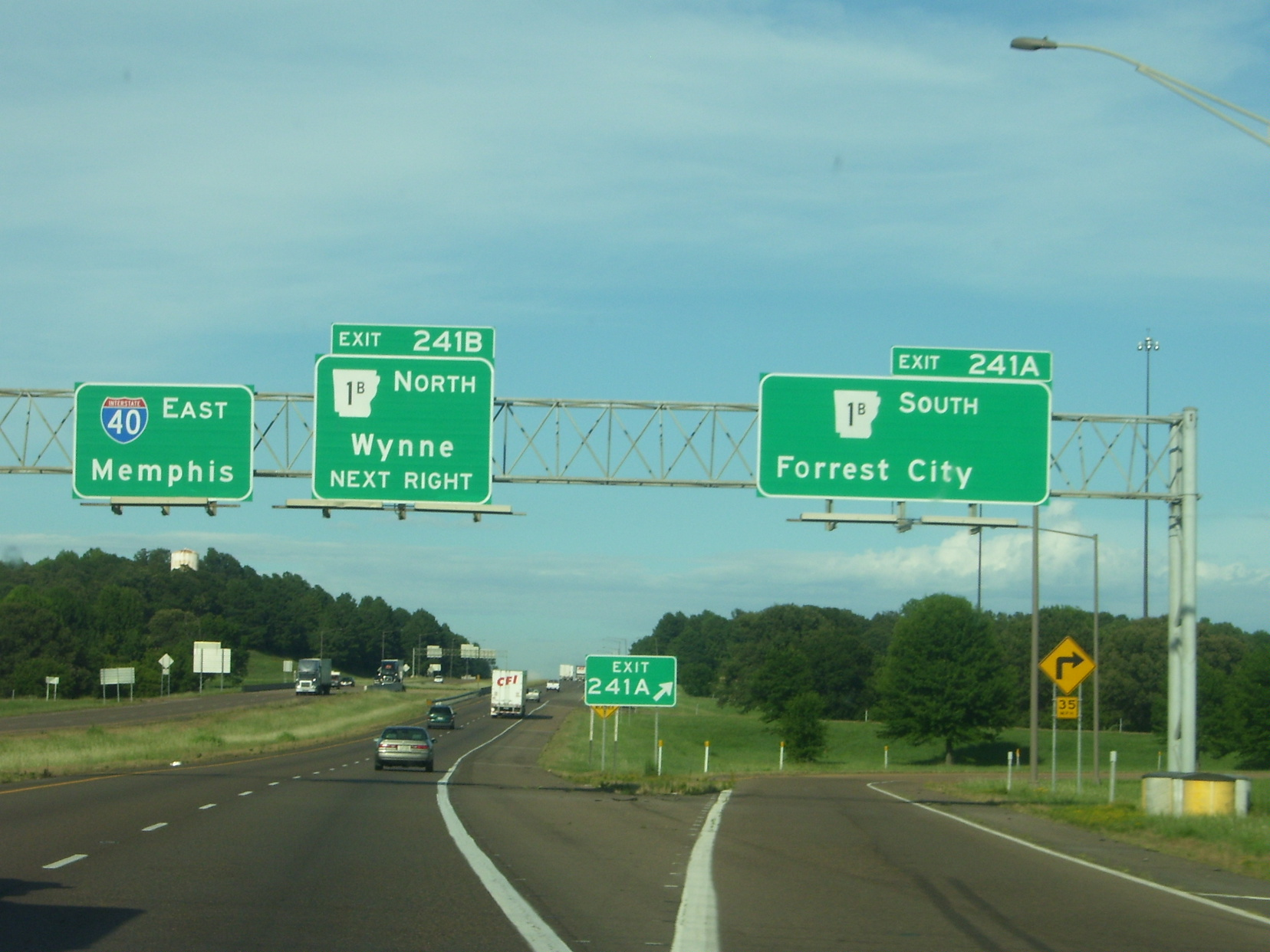
Two diverging white lines demarcate the theoretical gore of this highway exit on Interstate 40 in Arkansas, with a grass-covered physical gore following it: In this instance, the theoretical gore contains no markings.

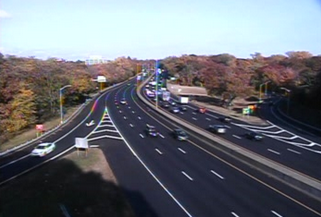
Exit gore on Interstate 95 in Connecticut: Note the theoretical gore has been marked with chevrons.

In road and highway construction, a gore (US) or nose (UK) is a triangular plot of land indicating where a road forks at an intersection or turning area, or merges with another road. Gores at exit ramps occasionally have impact attenuators, especially when an obstruction such as a bridge abutment follows the gore. A virtual gore or theoretical gore is an area marked with transverse or chevron painted lines to serve as a gore, or warn of an upcoming gore. Gores are not intended to be driven upon.

The US term "gore" (describing a space) is historical, representing a characteristically triangular piece of land, often designated incidentally when two surveys failed to meet. Etymologically, it is derived from the Old English word gār, meaning spear.

In the US, at the "theoretical gore point", a dotted white line becomes a wide, solid-white channelizing line and another wide, solid-white line angles off along the edge of the diverging road, forming an elongated white triangle in front of the gore. This as a "neutral area" with white chevron markings optionally added.

A very old example of a gore surviving as a street name in London is Kensington Gore, long completely built over and reshaped, where now stands the Albert Hall.

== See also ==
- Intersection (road)
