= Sears XDH-1 =

Concept car

Sears XDH-1 is an experimental electric car built for Sears, Roebuck and Company by their DieHard battery supplier Johnson Controls (Globe Union) in 1977 to celebrate the 10th anniversary of its DieHard brand of car batteries. The car was a Fiat 128 Coupé equipped with 20 DieHard (12-inch deep cycle marine) batteries, and an electric motor. The car has a front-wheel drive and was powered by a World War II-vintage 27-horsepower electric aircraft starter motor. The batteries are located in the trunk and former back seat area. The car has a top speed of approximately 70 miles per hour and has a range of 60–90 miles (at 50 MPH) per charge. The electric car is on display at the International Motorsports Hall of Fame and Museum in Talladega, Alabama.
