= Impact attenuator =

Safety device in traffic management used to soften the blows of car crashes

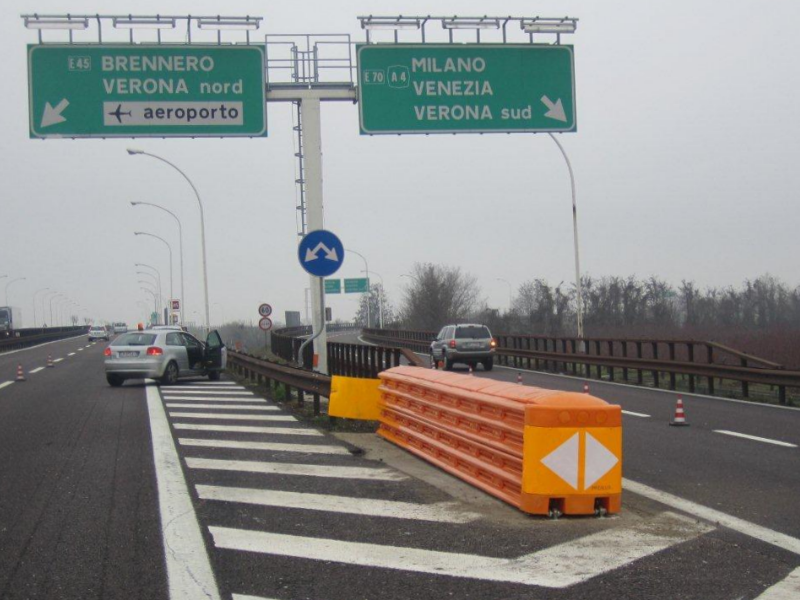
A crash cushion installed on a motorway exit in Italy

An impact attenuator, also known as a crash cushion, crash attenuator, or cowboy cushion, is a device intended to reduce the damage to structures, vehicles, and motorists resulting from a motor vehicle collision. Impact attenuators are designed to absorb the colliding vehicle's kinetic energy. They may also be designed to redirect the vehicle away from the hazard or away from roadway machinery and workers. Impact attenuators are usually placed in front of fixed structures near highways, such as gore points, crash barrier introductions, or overpass supports. Temporary versions may be used for road construction projects, including ones mounted on vehicles.

== Operation ==
Impact attenuators are designed to absorb the colliding vehicle's kinetic energy to bring it to a stop safely. If no impact attenuator is present, a vehicle which strikes a rigid roadside object will suddenly stop. A person inside will promptly collide with the interior of the vehicle, and that person's internal organs will collide with their chest wall, causing severe internal injuries and possibly death. By safely dissipating the vehicle's kinetic energy, impact attenuators help prevent such injuries.

Impact attenuators can be categorized by the method used to dissipate kinetic energy:

1. Momentum transfer. Many early models used successive rows of water-filled barrels or modules. Momentum is transferred to the water, reducing the speed of the impacting vehicle.
2. Material deformation. Many newer attenuators use crushable materials (like various kinds of foam) that create a crumple zone, absorbing energy. Others flatten a corrugated steel guard rail section, or split a steel box beam.
3. Friction. Some attenuators work by forcing a steel cable or strap through an angled slot or tube, converting kinetic energy into heat.

== Types ==
=== Gating ===
Gating impact attenuators allow vehicles impacting from the side to pass through them (akin to a gate).

Gating attenuators are more economical, but require a greater clear space surrounding them to be effective; without enough space, errant cars may pass through into another hazard, such as into lanes of opposing traffic.

==== Water-filled attenuators ====
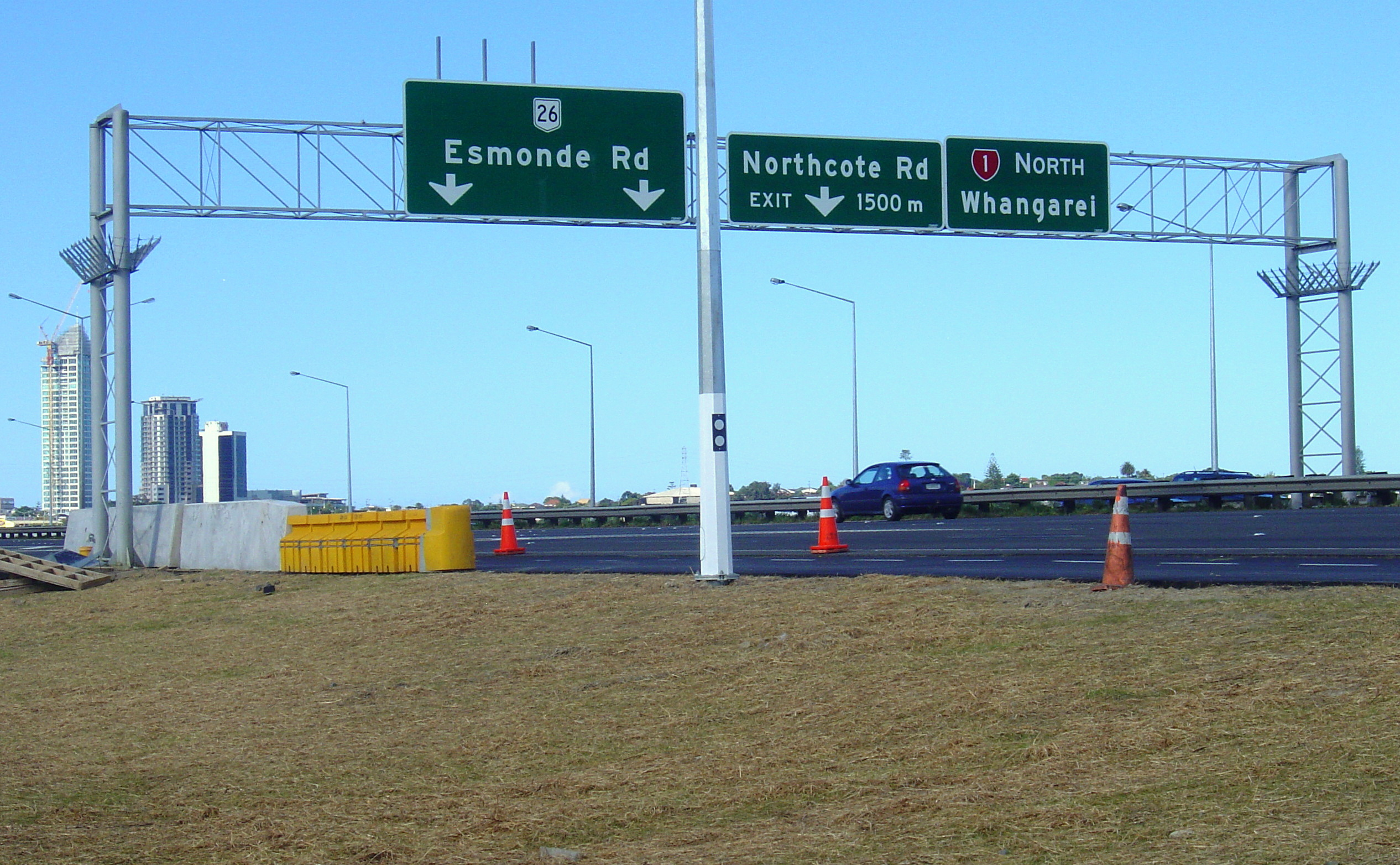
A water-filled attenuator, as seen in Auckland, New Zealand

Water-filled attenuators consist of containers filled with water to absorb impact energy. They are typically not anchored to the ground, and therefore benefit from easy deployment and relocation using barrier transfer machines and cranes. They are non-redirective, meaning they do not deflect vehicles that impact the side back into the roadway. The energy of the impacting vehicle accelerates the water in the barrels vertically and laterally consuming that energy in work done on the water. Additionally, this work is done over time which reduces the deceleration (negative acceleration) applied to the vehicle occupants. A smaller amount of energy is consumed in the work of crumpling the plastic containers. In cold climates, water-filled attenuators are either avoided, or have additives such as magnesium chloride salt added to them to prevent freezing.

==== Fitch barriers ====
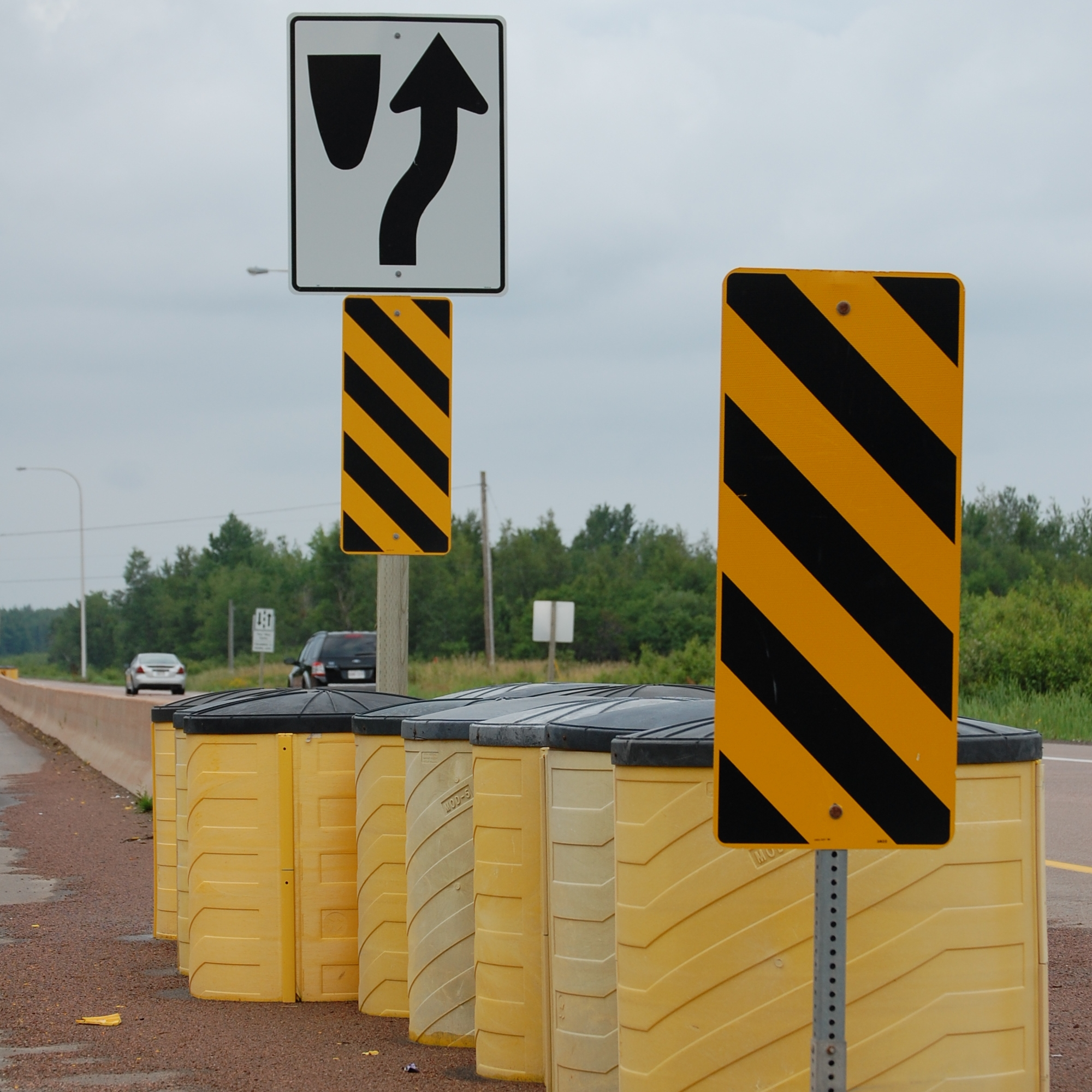
Fitch barriers in Canada

A Fitch barrier consists of sand-filled plastic barrels, usually yellow-colored with a black lid. The "Fitch Highway Barrier System" was invented by race car driver John Fitch after the 1955 24 Hours of Le Mans race when his co-driver Pierre Levegh rear-ended Austin-Healey driver Lance Macklin at high speed, launching Levegh's car through the air and into the spectator's area. The car burst into flames and took the lives of Levegh and 84 spectators in the worst accident in racing history. Fitch stated he was inspired by sand-filled fuel cans which he used to protect his tent from strafing during World War II. Early prototypes were self funded and tested due to low initial support. As a proof of concept Fitch used liquor barrels filled with sand to create the necessary impact attenuation, then personally crashed reinforced vehicles into them while recording with a high speed camera to capture the rate of deceleration.

Fitch barriers are often found in a triangular arrangement at the end of a guard rail between a highway and an exit lane (the area known as the gore), along the most probable line of impact. The barriers in front contain the least sand, with each successive barrel containing more, so that when a vehicle collides with the barrels they shatter, the kinetic energy is dissipated by scattering the sand, and the vehicle decelerates smoothly instead of violently striking a solid obstruction, reducing the risk of injury to the occupants.

Fitch barriers are widely popular due to their effectiveness, low cost, and ease of setup and repair or replacement. Since first being used in the late 1960s, it is estimated that they have saved as many as 17,000 lives and approximately $400 million per year in property damage and medical expenses.

=== Non-gating ===
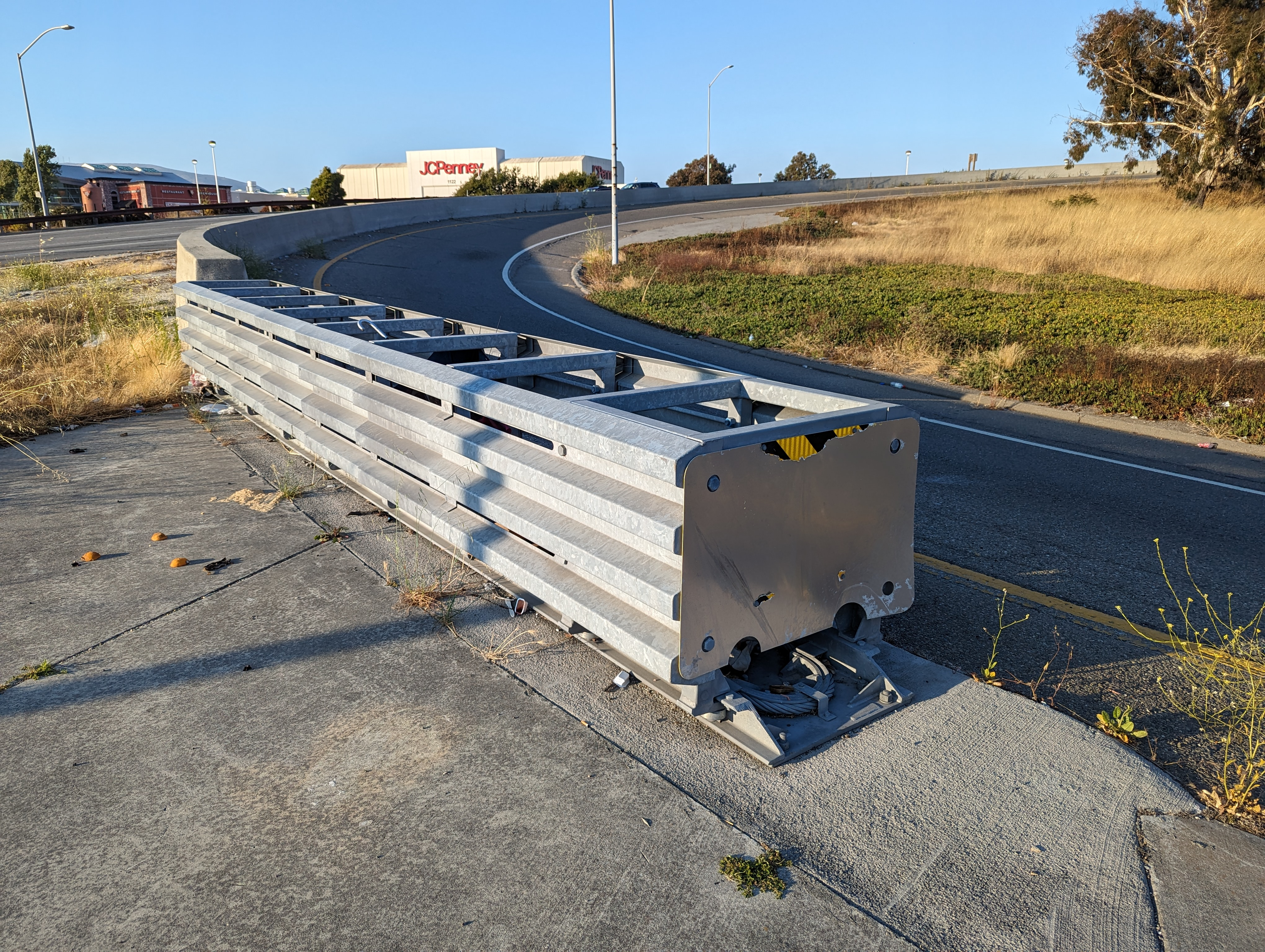
A telescoping crash cushion near Tanforan Shopping Center in San Bruno, California

Non-gating impact attenuators arrest the motion of vehicles that impact head-on, whilst deflecting vehicles that impact the side of the barrier. They are anchored and more expensive, but can be used in tighter spaces.

==== Crash cushions ====
Crash cushions are constructed of multiple segments, which crumple into each other when collided with to absorb the impact. Their main benefit is in their reusability; some attenuators can automatically return to their original position after a crash, while others require minimal repairs.

=== Truck mounted attenuators ===
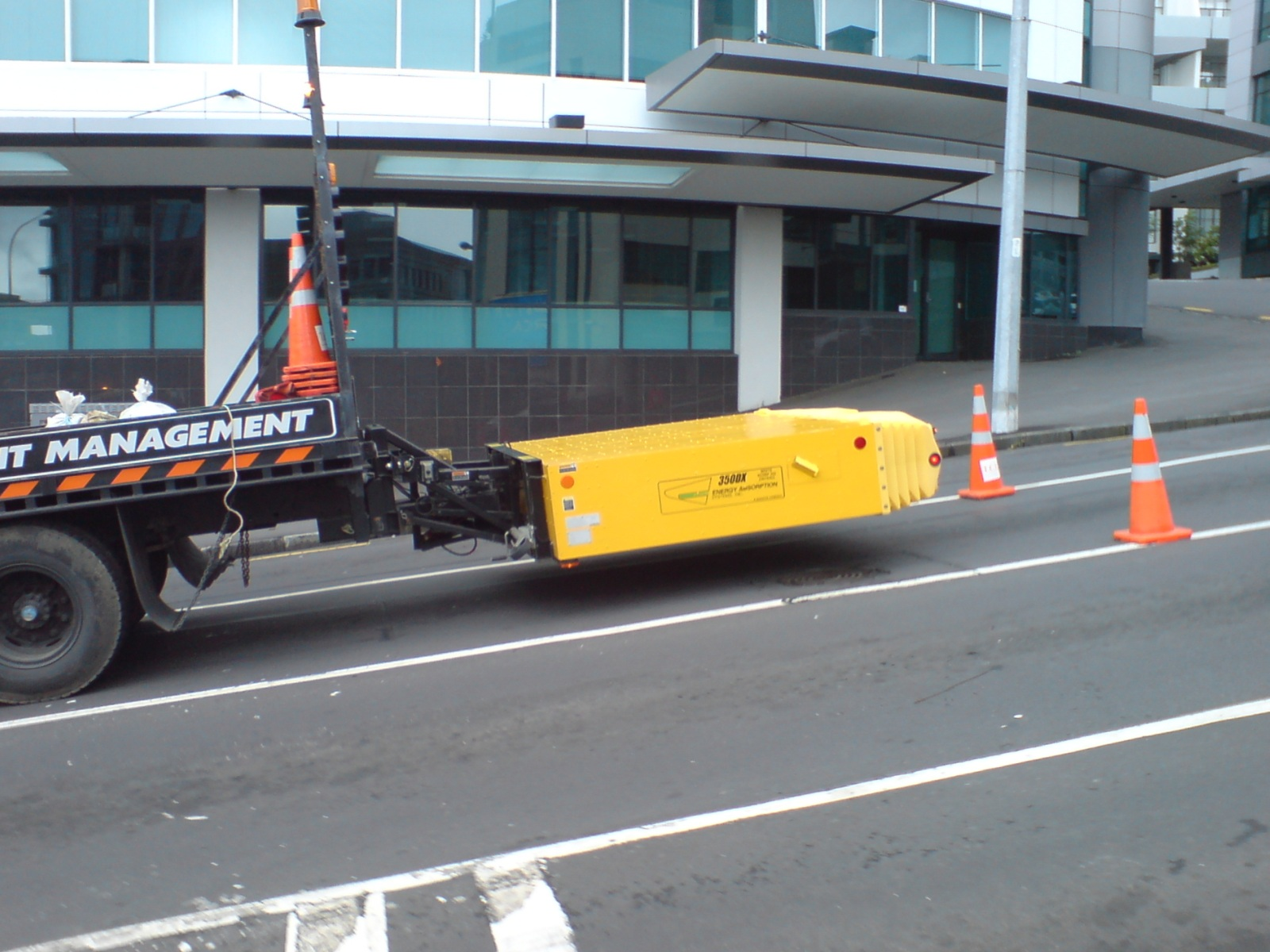
A truck-mounted attenuator (TMA) in New Zealand

Truck mounted attenuators (TMA), also known as an impact protection vehicle (IPV) are deployed on vehicles that are prone to being struck from behind, such as snow plows and road maintenance vehicles, most commonly on motorways. The TMA may be stationary or move at a slow speed. Work zone regulations often specify a minimum buffer distance between the TMA and the work area, and a minimum mass for the truck, to minimize the chances that the TMA will be pushed forward by a crash into the workers or machinery. This is especially important in mobile work zones where the TMA's parking brake may not be engaged.

In some countries, such as Sweden, road safety authorities operate dedicated TMA vehicles registered as emergency vehicles, able to be dispatched to blockages or emergencies.

TMA vehicles are better suited for protecting emergency or construction workers on roadways than non-specialized vehicles, such as firetrucks. TMA vehicles have several benefits over firetrucks, such as lower purchase and repair cost, improved firefighting capacity (because firetrucks are available for use and won't be damaged), and enhanced safety for the occupants of the impacting vehicles. This is because TMA vehicles are designed to absorb the energy of the impact, while firetrucks are too rigid and can cause severe injuries or death.

== Regulation ==
In the United States, impact attenuators are tested and classified according to AASHTO Manual for Assessing Safety Hardware (MASH), first issued in 2016 to supersede National Cooperative Highway Research Program (NCHRP) Report 350: Recommended Procedures for the Safety Performance Evaluation of Highway Features (1993). Classification is based on the maximum speed of a vehicle during a collision for which the attenuator is designed. The Federal Highway Administration reviews equipment to providing hardware eligibility letters for federal aid reimbursement.

== See also ==
- Crumple zone
- Shock absorber
- Traffic barrier
- SAFER barrier
