= Ralph Seagraves =

American businessman

William Ralph Seagraves (April 21, 1929 – September 27, 1998) was an American executive. For 13 years he was the president of R. J. Reynolds Tobacco Company’s Special Events Operations (now Sports Marketing Enterprises). His help in introducing Winston cigarette advertising into NASCAR and National Hot Rod Association (NHRA) lead him to be inducted in the International Motorsports Hall of Fame in 2008. He is the 2021 recipient of the NASCAR Hall of Fame’s Landmark Award.

== Career ==
Seagraves, born in Wilkes County, started with R. J. Reynolds (RJR) in 1955 as a salesman. By the late 1960s he was a division manager. He attended a 1969 R. J. Reynolds meeting where they discussed how to promote their tobacco with the April 1970 Public Health Cigarette Smoking Act prohibiting television and radio advertisements. NASCAR owner Junior Johnson suggested that RJR sponsor his team. Seagraves suggested that RJR should sponsor the entire league. The sponsorship resulted in NASCAR renaming their premiere series from the Grand National Series to the Winston Cup Series. RJR created the Special Events Operations division to find creative ways to promote the tobacco, and placed Seagraves in charge in 1972. After signing the deal, Reynolds had NASCAR founder Bill France Sr. change the schedule to remove most of the shortest tracks from the schedule so it could concentrate its marketing on larger crowds at larger tracks. Remaining events were over 250 miles long, and the number of races was reduced from 47 to 31. Seagraves hired apprentice T. Wayne Robertson to take a show car to local events such as shopping malls. Robertson brought along a sign with the current NASCAR points leaders and the location of the next event. Seagraves talked with RJR management and they agreed to increase to three show cars on display within 150 miles of the upcoming event to promote NASCAR and Reynolds.

Seagraves promoted the product in other sports, including golf, hydroplane racing, soccer (football), and tennis. RJR sponsored racetracks to upgrade their facilities, notably NASCAR Winston Racing Series short tracks throughout the United States. Tracks were given red and white paint and told to paint their safety walls alternating red and white to give the illusion of greater speed. Some tracks were on the verge of bankruptcy, and the sponsorship helped them and NASCAR survive. He also helped racing teams to find sponsors. In 1982, he urged Piedmont Airlines to become Richard Childress Racing's first sponsor. He retired in 1985. He was succeeded by T. Wayne Robertson.

== Death ==
Seagraves died on September 27, 1998. He was survived by his wife Ardette and son Colbert. Upon his death, NHRA president Dallas Gardner said "Ralph was certainly the patriarch of motorsports' sponsorships, but Ralph's real legacy is that he always considered R. J. Reynolds as a partner in building motorsports, not (just) a sponsor. His contribution to the success of NHRA is immeasurable. We will miss him."

== Career awards ==
Besides his International Motorsports Hall of Fame induction, he was inducted in the National Motorsports Press Association Hall of Fame in 1992 and the International Drag Racing Hall of Fame in 1993.
