= SAFER barrier =

Soft walls used in auto racing tracks

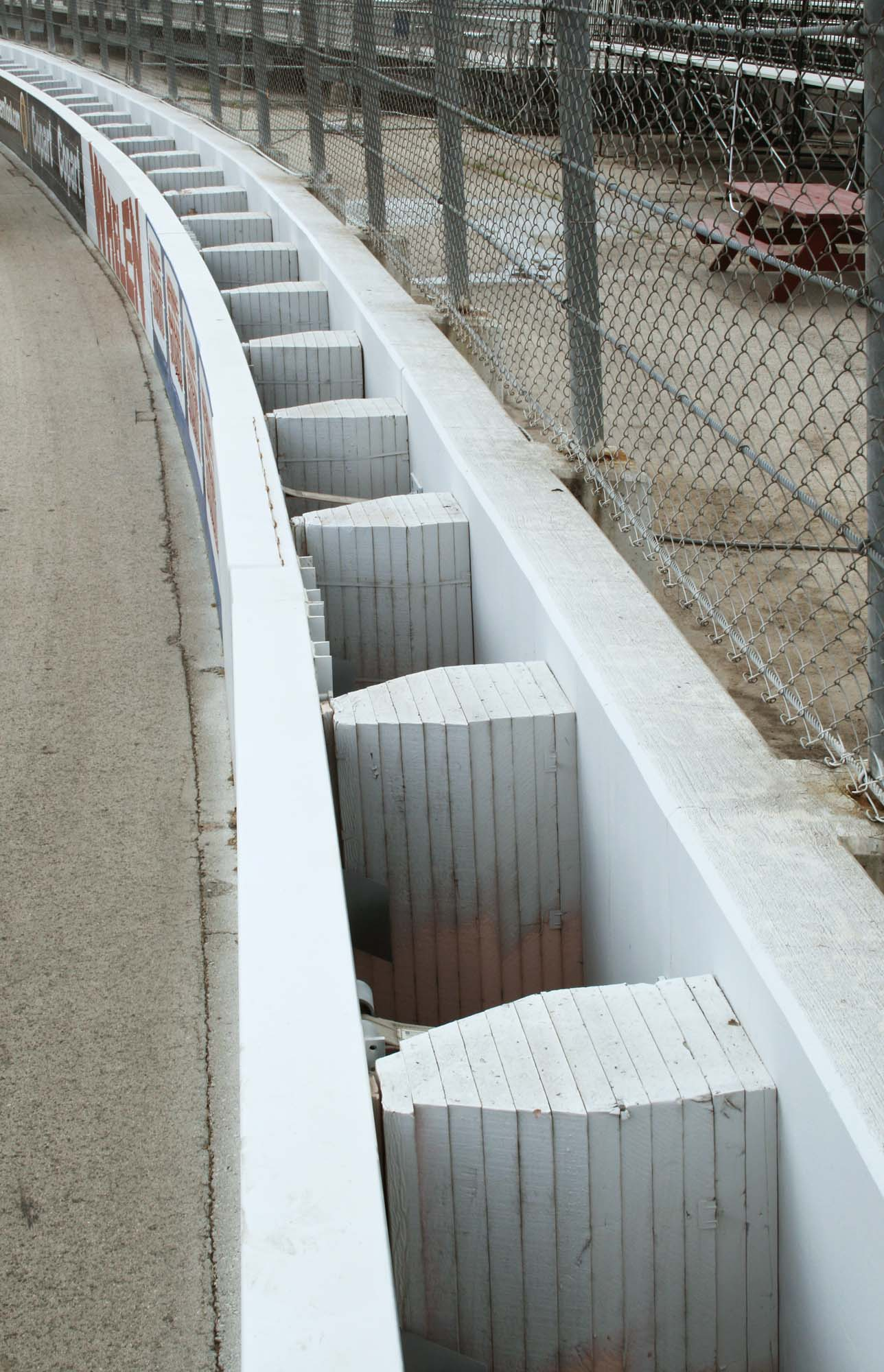
- The SAFER barrier at the Milwaukee Mile in 2009
- Inventor: Students at the Midwest Roadside Safety Facility at University of Nebraska–Lincoln
- Invention year: 1998
- First produced: 2002

The Steel And Foam Energy Reduction Barrier (SAFER Barrier), sometimes generically referred to as a soft wall, is a technology found on oval automobile race tracks and high-speed sections of road and street tracks, intended to absorb and reduce kinetic energy during the impact of a high-speed crash, and thus, lessen injuries sustained to drivers and spectators.

The SAFER barrier also lessens damage to the car itself, thereby reducing repair costs. After its introduction in 2002, nearly every oval track on the IndyCar and NASCAR circuits had the device installed by 2005. Road and street tracks apply SAFER barriers on high-speed cornering sections where space is limited.

It was designed by a team of engineers at Midwest Roadside Safety Facility at University of Nebraska–Lincoln. It was developed from 1998 to 2002, and first installed at Indianapolis Motor Speedway in May 2002. The SAFER Barrier and its developers have won several awards within the racing and engineering community, including the Louis Schwitzer Award, Pocono Raceway Bill France Sr. Award of Excellence, NASCAR Bill France Jr. Award of Excellence, R&D 100 Award, SEMA Motorsports Engineering Award, GM Racing Pioneer Award, Autosport Pioneering and Innovation Award. Dean Sicking received the National Science and Technology Medal from President George W. Bush, in part due to his work on the SAFER Barrier and on other roadside safety devices.

== History ==
=== Origins ===
Throughout the decades of organized professional automobile racing, track owners and sanctioning bodies were constantly developing and attempting to utilize various devices to protect drivers and spectators in the event of a crash. Tire barriers, water and sand barrels, Styrofoam blocks, gravel traps, guardrails, earth embankments, and other various low-cost devices were implemented, with a varying level of success and usefulness. In most cases, the devices were practical for road and street courses, but impractical, or particularly inappropriate for oval tracks.

Oval tracks typically were constructed with reinforced concrete walls around the entire perimeter of the track (and along all or parts of the inside perimeters). The high speeds of oval track racing required strong walls to prevent cars from leaving the racing surface and protect spectators alike, primarily due to centrifugal force. Early years saw metal guardrails on the outside perimeters at some oval tracks, but their limitations, maintenance needs, and sometimes troublesome results saw them completely phased out by the late 1980s. The concrete walls generally showed favorable protection for spectators, and even against large NASCAR stock cars, routinely held up nearly unscathed during crashes. They also usually required minimal maintenance. However, the hard surface and unforgiving nature of the walls were prone to cause injury to the drivers in a crash.

In the later years of the 20th century, sharply increasing speeds and several high-profile fatal accidents accelerated the need and public outcry for safety improvements at the track level. The undesirable results or outright failures of existing safety devices required the need for a full-scale research and development of a new device.

Throughout the 1970s–1990s, Indycar constructors, for instance, had attempted to address the issue of impact dissipation through car design. Pieces of the car (wheel assemblies, wings, bodywork, etc.) were designed to breakaway after impact, absorbing kinetic energy. Crumple zones were also created. While it typically yielded positive results, it also had drawbacks. The debris field created new hazards for cars approaching the crash scene, and if cars hit pieces of the debris, it could be propelled into the spectator areas. In two high-profile incidents multiple spectators were fatally injured when sheared-off wheel assemblies were punted into the grandstands.

==== PEDS Barrier ====
The precursor to the SAFER Barrier was developed in 1998. The Polyethylene Energy Dissipating System (or PEDS Barrier) was developed by the Indy Racing League and retired GM engineer John Pierce at Wayne State University. The device consisted of PE cylinders mounted upright along the concrete wall, covered with plates of the same material, overlapping each other in the direction of travel. The plates' mounting pattern resembled scales on a fish.

The PEDS barrier was installed on a trial basis at the Indianapolis Motor Speedway in time for the 1998 Indianapolis 500. It was installed along the inside wall near the entrance to the pits. However, it was not impacted during the race. About two months later, the barrier received its first full-scale test. During the 1998 IROC at Indy race, Arie Luyendyk spun and impacted the barrier broadside with his IROC stock car. The violent impact ripped many of the PEDS Barrier components from the wall, threw them high into the air, and littered the track with huge amounts of heavy debris. Luyendyk's car bounced off the wall, across the track and back into oncoming traffic. The car narrowly missed being T-boned by another car approaching the scene at high speed.

Though the barrier was credited with saving Luyendyk from serious injury, it was deemed mostly a failure due to the flaws that were exposed with the design. A slightly updated version (PEDS-2) was installed for a trial basis for the 1999 Indianapolis 500, but after driver Hideshi Matsuda impacted it, another major flaw (the tendency to "catch and pivot") was exposed. The barrier was removed soon after.

==== Other forms of "soft walls" ====
- Cellofoam – This is an encapsulated polystyrene barrier—a block of plastic foam encased in polyethylene.
- Impact Protection System (IPS) – This inner piece of the wall is then wrapped in a rubber casing. Holes are drilled in the concrete wall and cables are used to tie the segments to it.
- Compression barriers – This idea is to place cushioning materials, such as tires, water barrels, or sand barrels, against the concrete wall, and then cover those cushions with a smooth surface that would give when impacted, and then pop back out to its previous shape once the impact is over.

=== SAFER Barrier ===
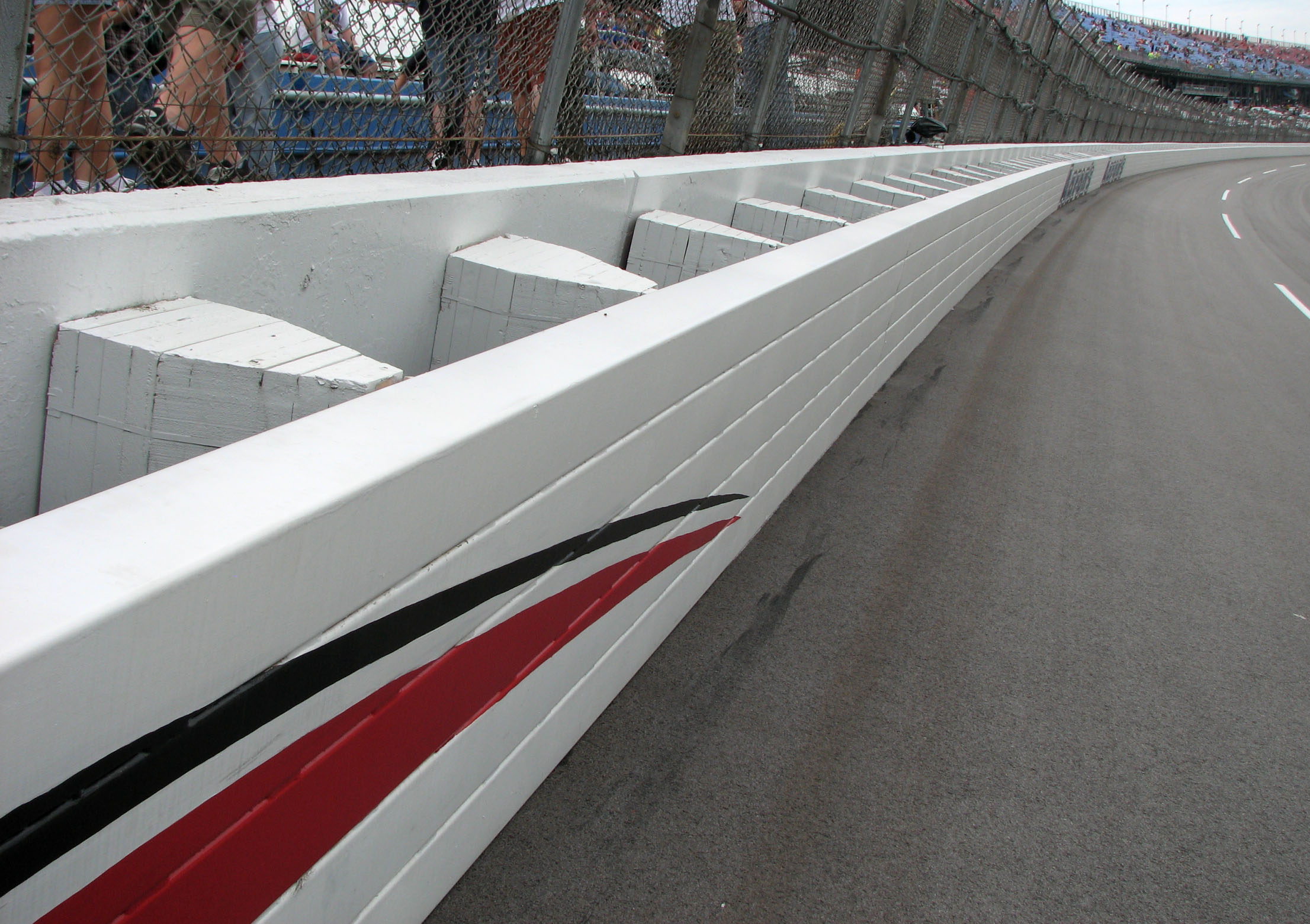
SAFER barrier at Talladega Superspeedway

After the mixed results with the PEDS Barrier, the Indianapolis Motor Speedway contacted engineers at the University of Nebraska–Lincoln starting in the fall of 1998, in order to spearhead development of a new barrier. The research effort was conducted by the Midwest Roadside Safety Facility and was sponsored and bankrolled by the Indy Racing League.

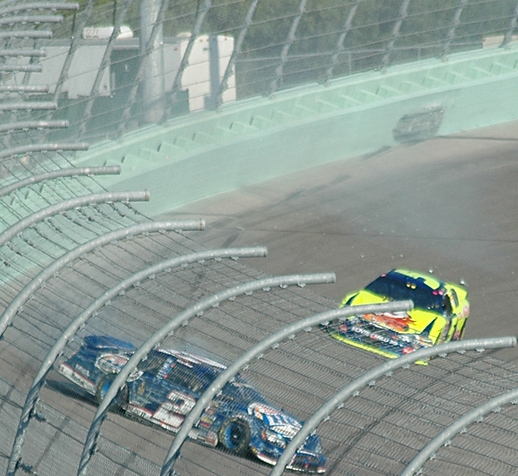
The SAFER barrier (teal) at Homestead-Miami Speedway after an impact from Kurt Busch's racecar

With the primary goal of reducing driver impact, the project also had the following objectives:

- A device that would have a flush surface – to prevent "catch and pivot" or "wrapping" scenarios.
- A device that would be able to be retro-fitted to the existing concrete walls at the multitude of speedways across the country, which each had varying existing conditions.
- Prevent the car from bouncing back to the racing surface and into oncoming traffic.
- Be able to withstand both open wheel Indy cars and heavy NASCAR stock cars (since many tracks hosted both series)
- A device that could easily be repaired after impact – preventing lengthy delays during an event.
- Cost-effectiveness

The SAFER Barrier development was completed in the spring of 2002, and was first installed at the Indianapolis Motor Speedway in May 2002, in time for the 2002 Indianapolis 500. It was first "tested" by Robby McGehee in a crash during the first day of practice.

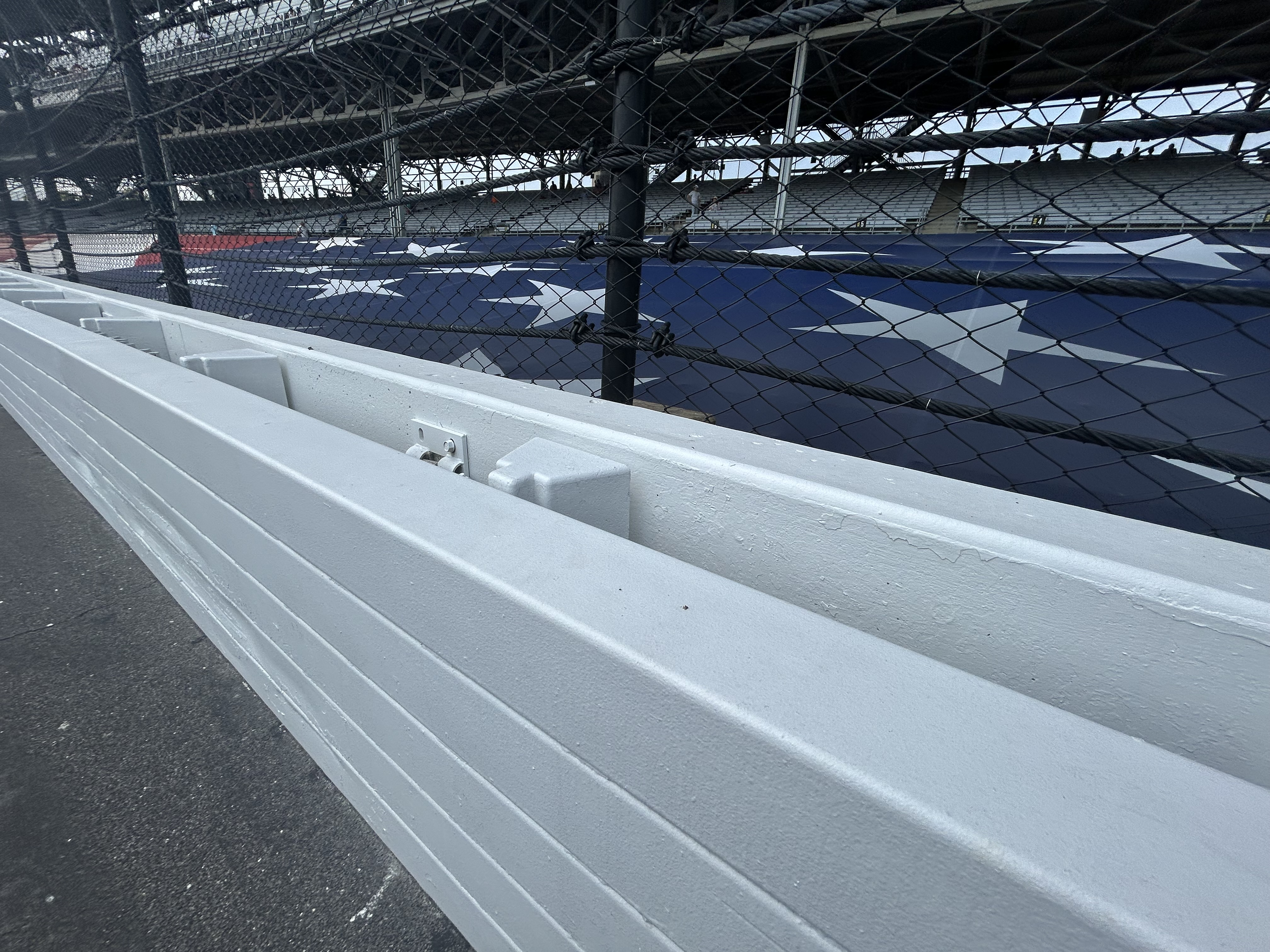
The SAFER barrier at the Indianapolis Motor Speedway in 2026

After successful usage at Indianapolis, the system began to be installed at several other tracks nationwide. By 2006, every oval facility that hosted an IRL IndyCar Series or NASCAR Sprint Cup Series event included the SAFER barrier. In 2006, Iowa Speedway became the first racetrack to install a purpose-built, self-standing SAFER barrier that extends around the entire outer circumference of the track. All previous installations had been the retrofit style to an existing concrete wall only in the turns. Most oval speedways more than a mile in length in the United States have since installed the system. Several tracks that had SAFER barriers initially installed in the turns in the early/mid-2000s have extended their barriers to more than just the turns, some to the entire perimeter. Many have added additional barriers along the inside walls.

An interesting challenge was presented with Dover International Speedway. When officials came to install the barrier, they found the wall, which was made of steel and not concrete, would not support the system. Officials were able to install the system on the inside concrete wall successfully. After a re-design and further testing, the system was installed a year and a half later.

The barrier received its first road course usage when Watkins Glen International adopted the SAFER barrier for key sections of the circuit, most notably in the bus stop chicane and Turn 11 for 2010. International road and street track adoption for the SAFER barrier has progressed gradually. Typically they are installed on high-speed cornering sections, where space for runoff areas or gravel traps is limited and side impacts are of concern. Notable uses include:

- Circuit de la Sarthe: Porsche Curves (2016)
- Autódromo José Carlos Pace: Turn 14 (2010)
- Baku City Circuit: Turns 13, 19 (2016)
- Circuit Gilles Villeneuve: Turn 5 (2017)
- Road America: Turn 11 (2019)
- Circuit Zandvoort: Turn 14 (2020)

== Materials ==
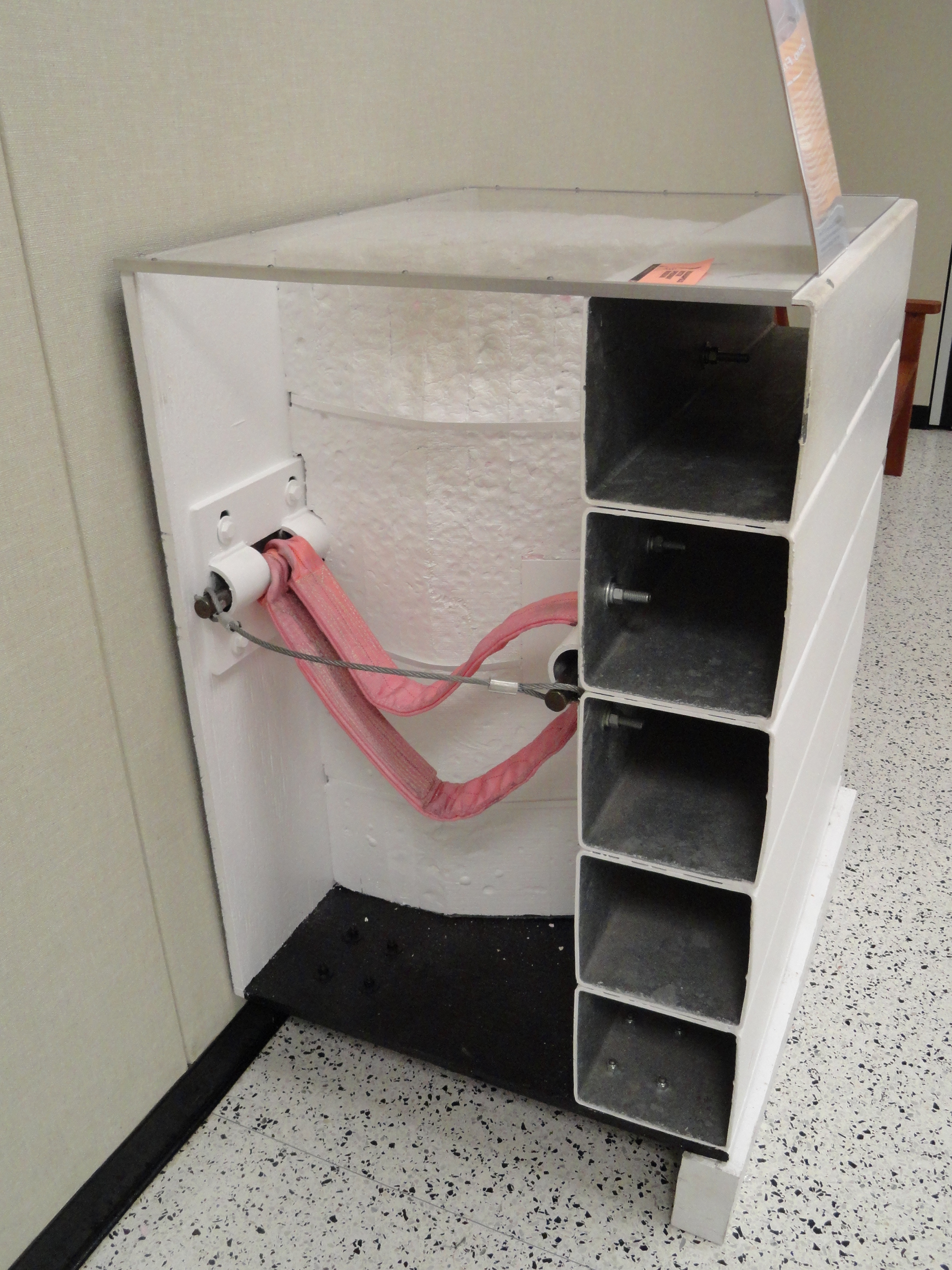
Cutaway of a SAFER barrier

The SAFER barrier consists of structural steel tubes welded together in a flush mounting, strapped in place to the existing concrete retaining wall. Behind these tubes are bundles of closed-cell polystyrene foam, placed between the barrier and wall. The theory behind the design is that the barrier absorbs a portion of the kinetic energy released when a race car makes contact with the wall. This energy is dissipated along a longer portion of the wall. The impact energy to the car and driver are reduced, and the car is likewise not propelled back into traffic on the racing surface.

Awards
Preceded by None	Autosport; Pioneering and Innovation Award; 2004	Succeeded by GP2 Series
