= Will O'Neill (politician) =

Former mayor of the City of Newport Beach

Will O’Neill
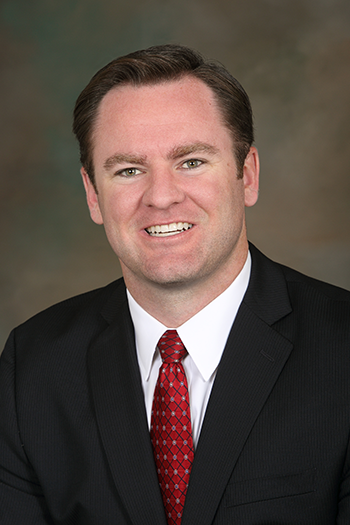

Mayor of Newport Beach
- In office 2019–2020
- Preceded by: Diane Dixon
- Succeeded by: Brad Avery
- In office 2023–2024
- Preceded by: Noah Blom
- Succeeded by: Joe Stapleton

Newport Beach City Council, District 7
- In office 2016–2024

Personal details
- Born: October 21, 1983 (age 42)
- Party: Republican

Will O'Neill (born October 21, 1983) is the current chairman of the Orange County Republican Party. He is the former Mayor of the City of Newport Beach and former chair of the San Joaquin Hills Transportation Corridor Agency.

== Life and career ==
O’Neill grew up in the Central Valley community of Fresno. At Stanford University he graduated with a bachelor's degree in history, and competed with the track and field team. O'Neill later studied for a Juris Doctor degree at the U.C. Hastings College of the Law. He has served on the U.C. Hastings Board of Governors, most recently as President during 2016-2017.

O'Neill is a partner with the law firm of Ross, Wersching & Wolcott, LLP. He previously worked for California Supreme Court Justice Marvin Baxter (Ret.), the California Court of Appeal (Fifth Appellate District), and Dallas-based firm Haynes & Boone, LLP. As chair of the Newport Beach Finance Committee, O'Neill led efforts to restructure Newport Beach's unfunded pension liability payments. O'Neill has also helped reform Newport Beach's civil asset forfeiture policy, and led efforts in Newport Beach to prohibit using public money to advocate for tax increases. As Mayor, O'Neill declared 2020 "The Year Of The Volunteer", to celebrate the volunteers and community members that give their time and talents for the betterment of the city.

On January 26, 2020, nine people (mostly from Newport Beach) died in a helicopter crash, including Kobe Bryant. O'Neill visited an impromptu candlelight vigil where he said: “There were seven lights that were burning bright this morning in Newport Beach and they got snuffed out. When we lose fathers and mothers and daughters and sons and those lights go out, we come together as a community. That’s who we are.” O'Neill was mayor during the COVID-19 pandemic, when Governor Gavin Newsom shut down Orange County's beaches. Mayor O'Neill appeared on The Tucker Carlson Show to denounce the closures as politically motivated rather than science-based. He also appeared on a Fox11 special report with Elex Michaelson and Dr. Drew Pinsky. Newport Beach's beaches were reopened shortly after. Mayor O'Neill was re-elected to Newport Beach City Council on November 3, 2020, after running unopposed.

In 2022, O'Neill was elected as chair of the San Joaquin Hills Transportation Corridor Agency (SJHTCA). The SJHTCA oversees the 73 Toll Road and includes member agencies Aliso Viejo, Costa Mesa, Dana Point, Irvine, Laguna Hills, Laguna Niguel, Laguna Woods, Mission Viejo, Newport Beach, San Juan Capistrano, Santa Ana and the County of Orange. When the SJHTCA approved an approximate $134 million budget for 2022-2023, O'Neill was quoted saying: “The agencies have a proven record of creating reliable infrastructure and ensuring our roads support the movement of people and goods through strong fiscal stewardship. The adoption of the budgets continues that stewardship and will allow us to continue providing transportation solutions in our region.”

In 2023, the council reelected O'Neill to Mayor for a second term. After Governor Newsom discussed "Trump-proofing" California following the 2024 United States presidential election, O'Neill criticized Democratic lawmakers and commented that "We here in Orange County are trying to Newsom-proof Orange County." On November 14, 2024, the Coast Guard detained 21 migrants found off the coast of Newport Beach. O'Neill again criticized state lawmakers, claiming "Every city in California now is essentially a border city thanks to SB 54." O'Neill termed out of his positions as Mayor and City Council member in December 2024.

In January 2025, O'Neill was elected as the new chairman of the Orange County Republican Party, succeeding Fred Whitaker.
