= Streatery =

Type of outdoor dining area

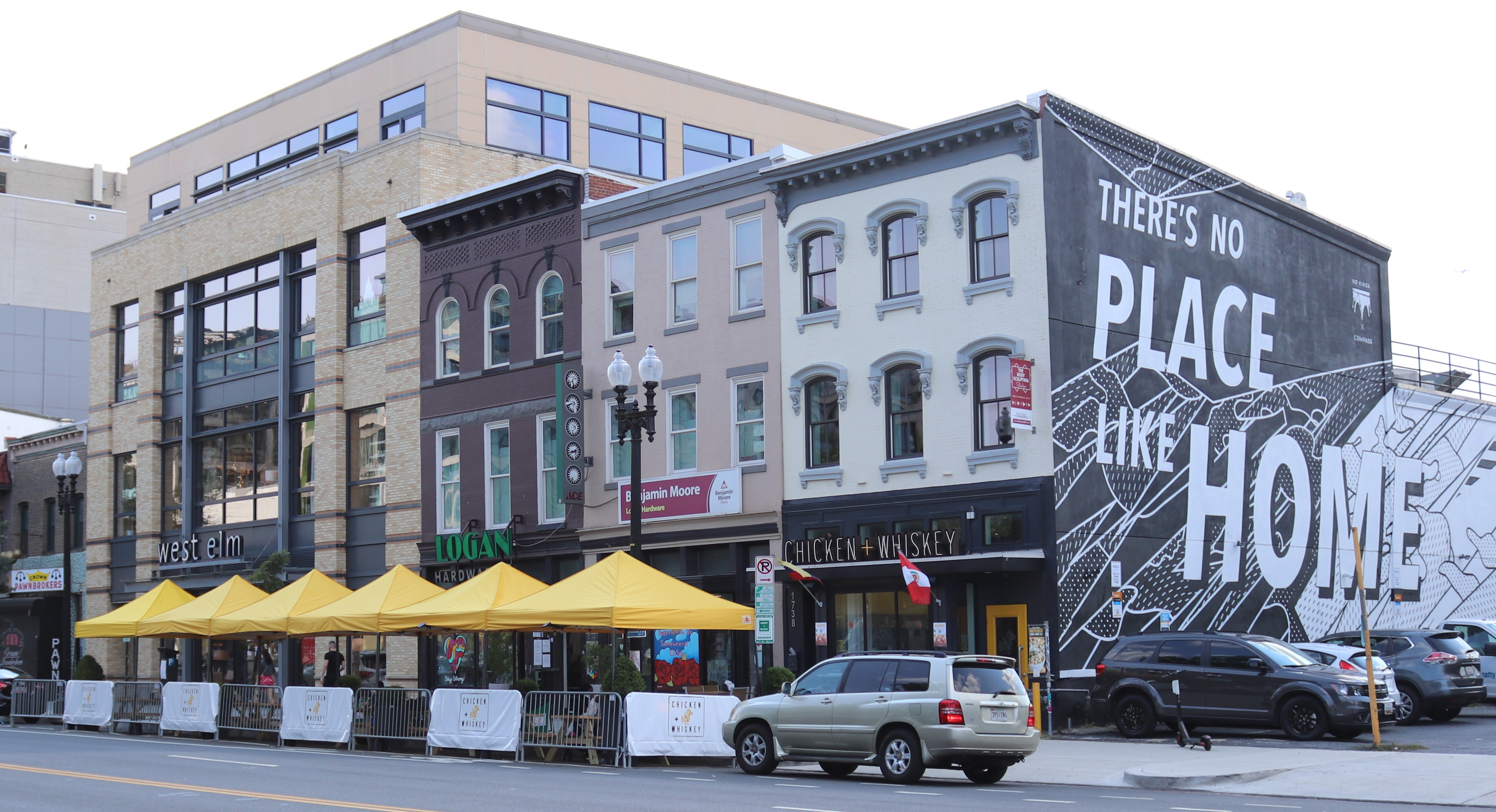
A Washington D.C. streatery

A streatery, or streetery (alternative spelling), is an outdoor dining area (or eatery), typically located on sidewalks or in on-street parking. The word streatery is a portmanteau of street and eatery. Their construction varies by business, depending on needs and local regulations; some provide cover from the elements and a decretive floor, others are simply barricaded dining areas.

== History ==
Streateries took off during the COVID-19 pandemic, when regulations favored outdoor seating options. Though most of these pandemic programs were originally temporary, many cities found success in their programs and kept them after pandemic restrictions eased, often with a more permanent facelift. While pandemic streateries were often nothing more than traffic barriers and chairs, post-pandemic streateries often are built structures which usually extend the sidewalk onto previously on-street parking spaces.

== Reception ==
Proponents of streateries say they provide much needed restaurant space and lower the barriers of entry for restaurants and small businesses. They also speak about the more lively and walkable environment streateries foster.

Opponents argue that they are unsightly and take up parking space.
