= List of mayors of Newport Beach, California =

Mayor of Newport Beach
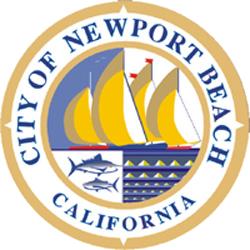
- Seal of Newport Beach

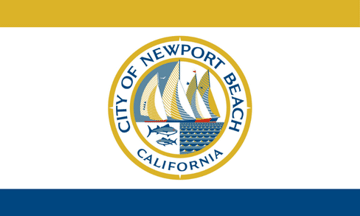
- Flag of Newport Beach
- Incumbent; Lauren Kleiman since December 9, 2025
- Term length: 1 year
- Formation: 1906
- First holder: John King

This is a list of mayors of Newport Beach, California since Newport Beach was incorporated in 1906. Until 1927, the governing body of the City was known as a Board of Trustees with a President as its head; an act of the Legislature in 1927 changed the Board to City Council with a Mayor as the head.

== List ==
=== Presidents of the Board of Trustees ===
- John King 1906–1908
- C. A. Barton 1908–1910
- A. N. Smith 1910–1912
- Albert Hermes 1912–1914
- W. K. Parkinson 1914–1916
- Stetson R. Jumper 1916–1917 (resigned mid-term)
- H. A. Robinson 1917–1918
- J. P. Greeley 1918–1922
- J. J. Schnitker 1922–1924
- George P. Wilson 1924–1926
- Dr. Conrad Richter (Note: Richter was both a President and Mayor) 1926–1928

=== Mayors of Newport Beach ===
- Marcus J. Johnson 1928–1932
- Dr. Herman Hilmer 1932–1936
- Harry H. Williamson 1936–1940
- Irvin George Gordon 1940–1942
- Clyan H. Hall 1942–1946
- O. B. Reed 1946–1948
- Dallas K. Blue 1948 (resigned mid-term)
- Dick Drake 1948–1950
- Lester L. Isbell 1950–1952
- A. W. Smith 1952 (resigned mid-term)
- Norman Miller 1952–1954
- Dora O. Hill 1954–1958
- James B. Stoddard 1958–1962
- Charles E. Hart 1962–1964
- Paul J. Gruber 1964–1968
- Doreen Marshall 1968–1970
- Edgar F. Hirth 1970–1972
- Donald A. McInnis 1972–1976
- Howard Rogers 1976 (died in office)
- Milan M. Dostal 1976–1978
- Paul Ryckoff 1978–1980
- Jacqueline E. Heather 1980–1982
- Evelyn R. Hart 1982–1984
- Philip Maurer 1984–1986
- John C. Cox, Jr. 1986–1988
- Donald A. Strauss 1988–1989
- Ruthelyn Plummer 1989–1990
- Phil Sansone 1990–1992
- Clarence J. Turner 1992–1994
- John W. Hedges 1994–1996
- Janice A. Debay 1996–1997
- Thomas Cole Edwards 1997–1998
- Dennis D. O’Neil 1998–1999
- John E. Noyes 1999–2000
- Garold B. (Gary) Adams 2000–2001
- Tod W. Ridgeway 2001–2002
- Steven Bromberg 2002–2003
- Tod W. Ridgeway 2003–2004
- Steven Bromberg 2004–2005 (resigned mid-term)
- John Heffernan 2005
- Don Webb 2005–2006
- Steven Rosansky 2006–2007
- Edward D. Selich 2007–2009
- Keith Curry 2009–2010
- Michael Henn 2010–2011
- Nancy Gardner 2011–2012
- Keith Curry 2012–2013
- Rush N. Hill, II 2013–2014
- Edward D. Selich 2014–2015
- Diane Brooks Dixon 2015–2016
- Kevin Muldoon 2016–2017
- Duffy Duffield 2017–2018
- Diane Brooks Dixon 2018–2019
- William O'Neill 2019–2020
- Brad Avery 2020–2021
- Kevin Muldoon 2021–2022
- Noah Blom 2022–2024
- William O'Neill 2023–2024
- Joe Stapleton 2024-2025
- Lauren Kleiman 2025-2026
