= ET-Plus Guardrail =

American traffic barrier system

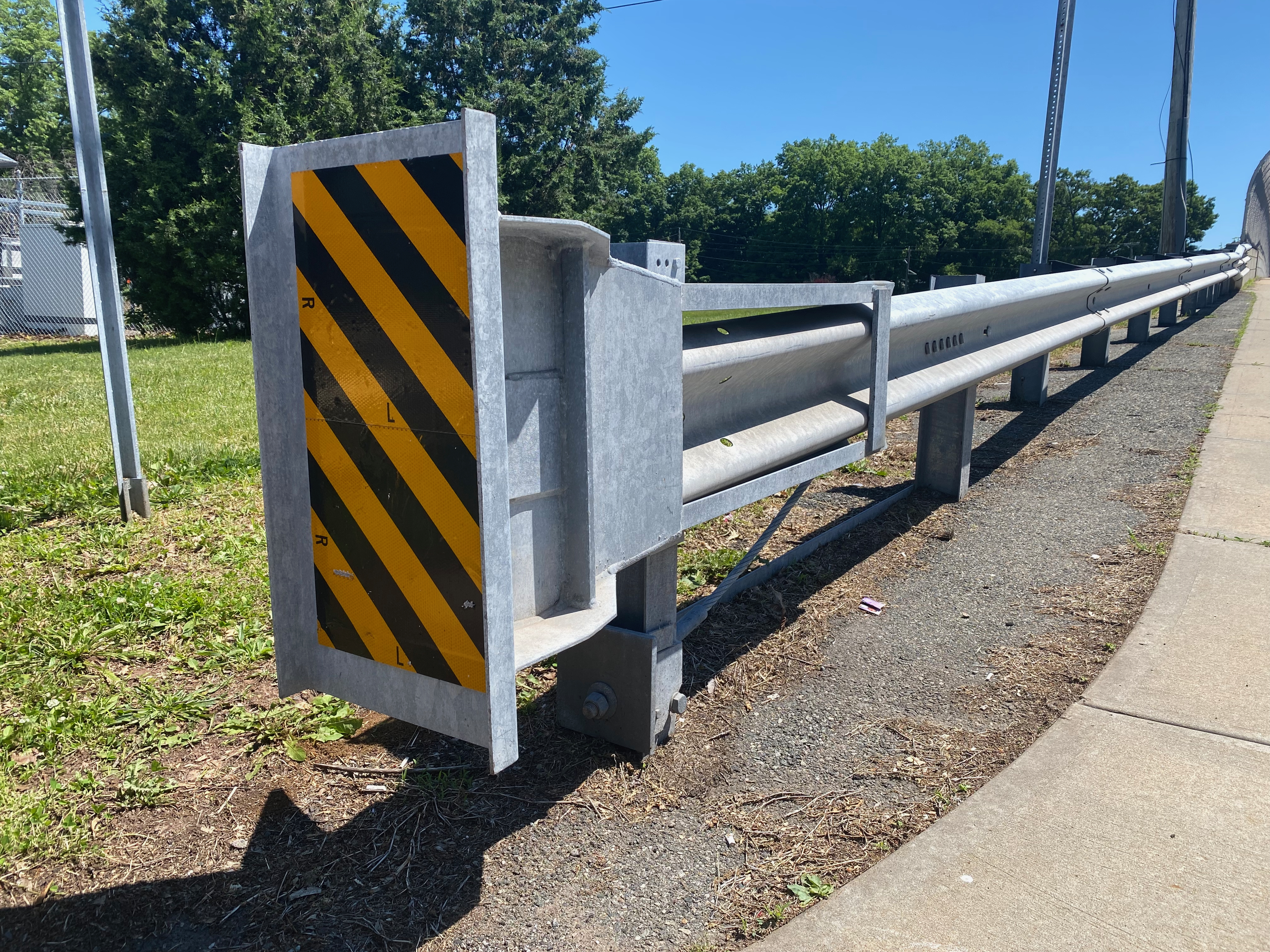
- ET-Plus guardrail terminal in New Jersey
- Inventor: Texas A&M Transportation Institute
- Inception: 1999
- Current supplier: Trinity Industries

The ET-Plus Guardrail system is a guardrail end terminal system manufactured by Trinity Highway Products, based in Dallas, Texas. The ET-Plus was designed at the Texas A&M Transportation Institute and built by Trinity. The end terminal cap absorbs the impact of a crash. The wooden posts break and the guardrail collapses. The end terminal slides along, pushing the guardrail to the side. However, in 2005, Trinity made changes to the ET-Plus without reporting the changes. It was alleged that the Trinity design change caused it to malfunction. A lawsuit under the False Claims Act filed in 2012 against Trinity stated that these changes were causing damages to cars and drivers. Tests have shown that the guardrails act the way they should.

== History ==
In the 1980s, Texas A&M Transportation Institute (TTI) had been conducting researches to improve guardrail safety for head-on collisions of guardrail ends. As a result, it developed the first model of energy-absorbing guardrail end terminals called ET-2000. The design used the "rail extrusion" process to allow the impact head with an extrusion throat to dissipate the impact energy by extruding the metal guardrail to bend it away from the vehicle to prevent it from spearing into the vehicle. ET-2000 crash testing that followed the guidelines in the United States was accepted by the Federal Highway Administration in 1989. The first recorded successful use was on Interstate 35 near Buda, Texas.

In 1993, National Cooperative Highway Research Program published a report titled NCHRP Report 350, outlining an updated crash test and evaluation requirements to reflect the higher speeds and types of larger vehicles on the United States highways. ET-2000 was tested in accordance to the NCHRP Report 350 in 1995 and was accepted by the Federal Highway Administration.

In 1999, TTI started developing ET-Plus based on the same extrusion throat design but with larger impact plate to accommodate more varieties of the vehicles and to reduce the weight of the impact head to lessen the crash severity. The design had 5-inch (13 cm) guide channels. A NCHRP Report 350 crash test of ET-Plus was conducted. Based on this specific test and an earlier full battery of tests of ET-2000 which shared the same extrusion throat design, the Federal Highway Administration approved ET-Plus to be used on highways in a letter dated January 18, 2000. TTI signed an exclusive licensing with Trinity Highway Products to be the manufacturer and seller of ET-Plus.

TTI engineers continued to conduct researches and recommended to Trinity that by narrowing ET-Plus guide channels from 5 inches (13 cm) to 4 inches (10 cm), it could improve the alignment of the head on the rail. In 2005, Trinity proposed that it would use the 4-inch channel version for a new set of tests required for the new 31-inch (79 cm) guardrail height installations per NCHRP Report 350. The prototype of the 4-inch model was reviewed and approved by TTI. Trinity then used that model for the 2005 test battery. On September 2, 2005, the Federal Highway Administration approved ET-Plus to be used for the 31-inch installations. However, it was later revealed that the Federal Highway Administration was not notified of the modification to 4-inch channel at the time of the approval.

ET-Plus continued to be eligible for federal-aid reimbursement, until December 31, 2017, when ET-Plus did not comply to the new test criteria as outlined in the Manual for Assessing Safety Hardware (MASH).

== Controversies ==
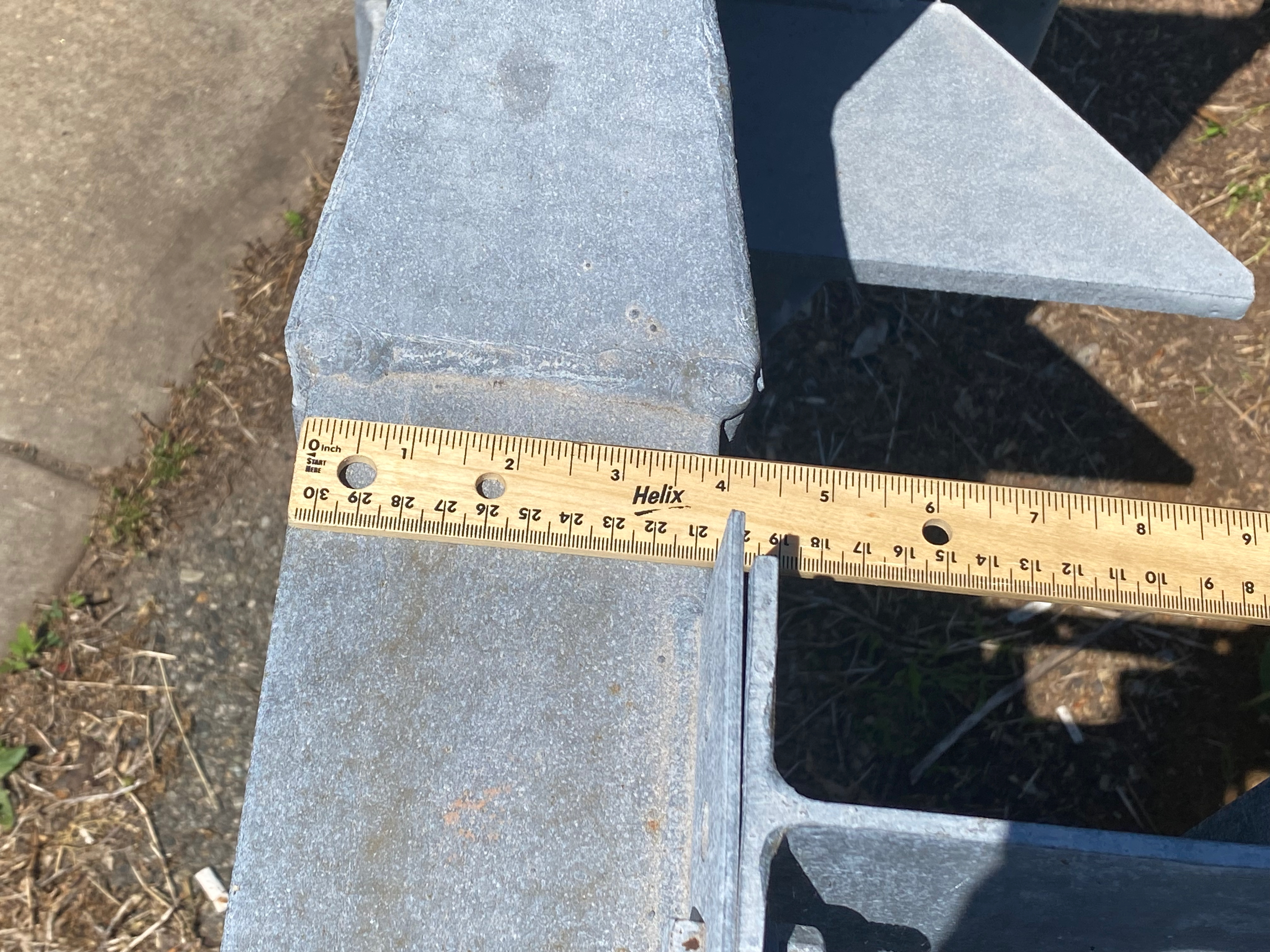
ET-Plus with 4-inch channel

On March 6, 2012, Joshua Harman, a Virginia guardrail engineer and a co-owner of a Trinity's competitor, was whistleblower in a federal suit which accused Trinity of failing to notify the Federal Highway Administration (FHWA) of a change of size of the end piece from five to four inches. The Federal Highway Administration requires that changes be reported immediately. The change from five inches to four allegedly saved the company $2 per end terminal. During a testimony, it was revealed that five crash tests were done in 2005 and 2006 showing the ET-Plus a failure by spearing a vehicle or flipping it. Trinity argued that the tests were on an experimental system, and that the guardrails on the roads are safe. A federal jury found Trinity guilty of fraud by not reporting a change of one inch made to the ET-Plus end terminal.

In October 2013, there was an allegation that Trinity produced the third version which slightly changed the 4-inch model was installed in Alabama highways in April 2013. It was alleged that the third version had some minor dimension changes including an expansion of welded-steel unit by 0.25 inches (0.64 cm), and those would be enough to prevent the 4-inch ET-Plus to malfunction.

In November 2014, Trinity announced its plan to retest the 4-inch ET-Plus model and stopped the sale of the units until testing is completed. In December 2014, an FHWA commissioned peer review of the study "Relative Comparison on NCHRT 350 Accepted W-Beam Guardrail End Terminals" was conducted by the University of Alabama at Birmingham. The reviewers found the information presented to be either questionable or invalid due to assumptions made on the report. Tests were mandated by the FHWA.

As of January 2015, 40 states had suspended new installations of ET-Plus terminals with 200,000 terminals had already been used on United States highways. States that have used the ET-Plus terminals are eligible for federal reimbursements. The company did a series of eight crash tests which were released in February 2015. done by Southwest Research Institute in Texas. The tests were conducted at the height of 31 inches to meet crash test criteria. The test results must be considered alongside data from actual crashes to come up with a comprehensive report. Additionally, the FHWA collected measurements of more than 1,000 four-inch ET-Plus devices to address an allegation that there were the third version of ET-Plus units on the roadways. This data collection was to ensure that the 4-inch ET-Plus sets used in the tests were representative of actual terminals in use in many states. The result published on March 11, 2015 concluded that there was no systematic variation in the dimensions of the 4-inch ET-Plus units on the roadways and the ones used in the Southwest Research Institute tests.

The U.S. Justice Department launched a criminal investigation into the use of the guardrail system in April 2015. The federal cases accuse Trinity of making false and misleading statements about the ET-Plus system.

In June 2015, a US district court jury verdict of $663 million was passed against Trinity Industries for defrauding the Federal Highway Administration. The original penalty of $175 million was tripled to $525 million, and an additional $8,250 was charged for each of the 16,771 false certification claims made by Trinity. Joshua Harmon, the whistleblower for the case, was awarded more than $16 million in legal fees and $2.3 million in expenses. Harmon was also awarded $199 million, thirty percent of the $663 million judgement. In September 2017, the United States Court of Appeals for the Fifth Circuit, in an opinion authored by Judge Patrick Higginbotham, reversed the finding of the district court and rendered judgement as a matter of law for Trinity.

On November 5, 2015, a class action lawsuit was filed by counties in Missouri, including the city of St. Louis, Missouri, and the state’s transportation authority, against Trinity Industries and Trinity Highway Products alleging that the ET-Plus guardrails were defective and dangerous. The lawsuit was settled for $56 million in 2022.
