= Haynes and Boone =

Multinational corporate law firm

Haynes Boone
- Headquarters: Harwood No. 14; Harwood Historic District Dallas, Texas
- No. of offices: 21
- No. of attorneys: 750
- No. of employees: 1,500(approximate)
- Major practice areas: Corporate/Securities; Banking & Finance; Energy; Real Estate; Intellectual Property; Labor & Employment; Technology; Business Litigation; Healthcare
- Revenue: $749,300,000 USD (2025)
- Date founded: 1970 (Dallas, Texas)
- Founders: Richard Haynes; Michael Boone
- Company type: LLP
- Website: www.haynesboone.com

Haynes Boone is an international corporate law firm headquartered in the Harwood Historic District of Dallas, Texas. It is among the largest law firms based in the United States and provides services for more than 40 major legal practices. More than 750 lawyers practice across 21 global offices in California, Colorado, Illinois, Massachusetts, New York, North Carolina, Texas, Virginia, Washington, D.C., London, Mexico City and Shanghai.

== History ==
Haynes Boone was founded in 1970 by partners Richard D. Haynes (1936–2001), and Michael Boone, who had been his student at Southern Methodist University. The firm offers full legal services across multiple sectors, including energy, financial services, private equity and technology. Noted attorney Nina Cortell joined the firm after graduating law school in 1976, as its 13th attorney.

Haynes and Boone built their office from a securities practice, handling IPOs in Dallas from the late the 1960s onward. In 1984, the firm opened a second office in Fort Worth, followed by a third office in Austin two years later. Haynes Boone expanded to Houston in 1990 through a merger with Watt, White & Craig.

The North American Free Trade Agreement (NAFTA) spurred the firm's next expansion. In 1994, it opened its first two offices outside of Texas: a cross-border branch in Mexico City and an out of state branch in Washington, D.C. At that time, the firm had established seven offices and had over 300 lawyers, 30 of whom were international lawyers. The firm continued to grow, adding offices in New York City in 2004, Orange County and Palo Alto in 2009, Shanghai in 2013, Chicago and Denver in 2015, London in 2016, the Woodlands in 2018, Charlotte in 2019, San Francisco in 2020 and Northern Virginia in 2023. In January 2026, Haynes Boone opened an office in Boston, led by managing partner Richard Kerr. The office focuses on investment management regulation, complex business litigation and asset securitization.

== Notable clients and cases ==
The firm advised then-incoming President George W. Bush prior to his sale of Harken Energy stock, in 1990.

In 1993, the firm won $420 million for Exxon in an insurance coverage case against Lloyd's of London over the Exxon Valdez tanker spill in Alaska.

In 1997, it negotiated a settlement for the Catholic Dioceses of Dallas involving sexual molestation charges and its priests.

In 1999, it oversaw the merger between Exxon Corp and Mobile Oil Corp.

In 2001, Haynes and Boone led a constitutional challenge to Texas' school finance system in West Orange-Cove C.I.S.D. v. Neeley, which ultimately persuaded the Texas Supreme Court to strike down the state's school finance system.

In 2011, it negotiated AT&T Corp's agreement to buy cell carrier T-Mobile USA.

In 2016, the firm defended Abbot Laboratories in a whistleblower case.

In 2017, it was among several firms that represented Trinity Industries to obtain a reversal of a $663 million verdict in federal court for an employee who claimed his company had hidden the fact that its highway guardrails did not meet federal standards.

In 2018, amid an immigration crackdown on the South Texas border, the firm represented many immigrant families pro bono.

In 2019 and 2020, the firm oversaw cases that upheld pension rule changes designed to preserve the liquidity of the Dallas Police and Fire Pension system.

In 2023, Haynes and Boone represented a coalition of news organizations seeking a release of records from the 2022 mass shooting in the City of Uvalde.

In 2025, the firm served as lead counsel for a coalition of booksellers and publishers that successfully challenged the READER Act, which a federal court in Texas permanently blocked on First Amendment grounds.

== Recognition ==
Haynes received the Justinian Award for Public Service in 1989 for ongoing service to the Dallas community. Boone received the Justinian Award in 2004.

In 2019, Michael M. Boone Elementary School in Dallas was named by the Highland Park Independent School District in honor of the firm's co-founder. In 2024, Boone was inducted into the Texas Business Hall of Fame.

== Alumni ==
- Eric Johnson, Dallas mayor
- Salman Bhojani, U.S. Representative, Texas' 92nd District
- Don Willett, U.S. Court of Appeals Judge, 5th Circuit
- Leigha Simonton, Former U.S. Attorney, Northern District of Texas
- Jeremy Kernodle, U.S. District Judge, Eastern District of Texas
- Wendy Davis, Former U.S. Senator, Texas' 10th District
- Will O’Neill, Newport Beach mayor
- Jason Villalba, Former U.S. Representative, Texas' 114th District
- David Crump, Law professor, legal scholar and writer
- David Epstein, University of Richmond School of Law professor
- Sarah Saldaña, Fourth director of U.S. Immigration and Customs Enforcement
