= Conflict of Interest (disambiguation) =

A conflict of interest is a situation in which serving one interest could involve working against another.

Conflict of Interest may also refer to:

- "Conflicts of Interest" (Babylon 5), a 1997 television episode
- "Conflicts of Interest" (Doctors), a 2005 television episode
- Conflict of Interest (album), an album by Ghetts
- Conflict of Interest (EP), an EP by Darkwell
- "A Conflict of Interest", a 1987 episode of Yes, Prime Minister
- "A Conflict of Interests", nickname of "Episode 4" (Life on Mars, series 1)
- Conflict of Interest (novel), a legal thriller by David Crump
- Conflict of Interest (film), a 1993 independent film directed by Gary Davis
- "Conflict of Interest" (South Park)
- Conflict of interest editing on Wikipedia
