= Spig =

Spig may refer to:

- Spigelia, a plant used extensively in homeopathy
- Frank Wead (1895–1947), nicknamed "Spig", a U.S. Navy aviator
- SPIG Industry LLC, a Virginia-based company founded by Joshua Harman

== See also ==
- SplG, an alternate name for spore photoproduct lyase
- SIPG — Shanghai International Port Group
