= Diane Dixon (politician) =

California State Politician

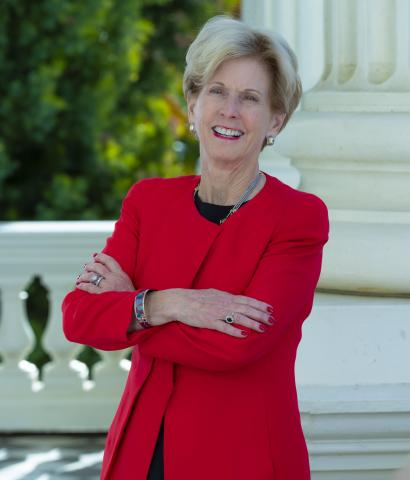
- Official portrait, c. 2022

Member of the California State Assembly from the 72nd district
- Incumbent
- Assumed office December 5, 2022
- Preceded by: Janet Nguyen

Member of the Newport Beach City Council, District 1
- In office December 9, 2014 – December 5, 2022
- Preceded by: Mike Henn
- Succeeded by: Joe Stapleton

Personal details
- Born: Diane Brooks Dixon
- Party: Republican
- Spouse: Pat Dixon
- Education: University of Southern California (BA)
- Website: https://assembly.ca.gov/dixon

Diane Brooks Dixon is an American politician serving in the California State Assembly. As a Republican, she represents the 72nd State Assembly District, which includes Huntington Beach, Newport Beach, Seal Beach, Laguna Hills, Laguna Woods, Lake Forest, Aliso Viejo, Laguna Beach, and portions of Costa Mesa. She was a former mayor and city councilwoman of Newport Beach.

Dixon has had 20 bills signed into law by the Governor through the 2023/24 and 2025/26 legislative sessions. She has had more bills signed into law than any other Republican lawmaker during that period. These bills have heavily focused on E-Bike regulation, drug and alcohol recovery facilities and human trafficking.

== Education and marriage life ==
Diane earned her Bachelor of Arts with honors in political science from the University of Southern California. She is married to Patrick Dixon, a career prosecutor who serves as a Special Counsel to the Orange County District Attorney.

== Political life ==
Diane spent 40 years in the private sector as a business executive before being elected to the Newport Beach City Council in 2014, where she served two terms as a Mayor. Her leadership helped deliver budget surpluses, pay down pension liabilities, improve public safety, and complete infrastructure projects on time and within budget and foster greater cooperation between residents, businesses and government to resolve community problems. Diane is past president of the Association of California Cities-Orange County. She served (2019-2022) on the regional council of the Southern California Association of Governments (SCAG) and as a board member of the Orange County Council of Governments (OCCOG).

In 2020, Dixon ran for the California State Assembly against first-term Democrat Cottie Petrie-Norris. Dixon lost the general election by a very narrow margin. In 2022, redistricting led Petrie-Norris to run in a neighboring district. Dixon won the election.

Diane has been an active member on several philanthropic community-based boards of directors for nearly four decades, including United Way Orange County, YMCA, USC Board of Councilors and Alumni Association, educational institutions, child service agencies and health-related organizations.

She currently represents 37 miles of Orange County’s coastline. She secured $1.5 million from the California State Budget with then-State Senator Dave Min to finalize construction of the Upper Newport Bay Trash Interceptor before creating the San Gabriel River Working Group. This working group created a Memorandum of Understanding (MOU) between Orange County and Los Angeles County and their cities, along with signing a partnership with the Netherlands-based nonprofit The Ocean Cleanup. She attributes much of this environmental work to her involvement in the bipartisan Problem Solvers Caucus

In 2026, she ran for the Orange County Board of Supervisors. She was narrowly defeated by incumbent Democratic Katrina Foley.

== Electoral history ==
=== Newport Beach City Council ===
2014 Newport Beach City Council 1st district election
Candidate	Votes	%
Diane Dixon	19,619	100.0
Total votes	19,619	100.0

2018 Newport Beach City Council 1st district election
Candidate	Votes	%
Diane Dixon (incumbent)	21,169	59.0
Mike Glenn	14,688	41.0
Total votes	35,857	100.0

=== California State Assembly ===
2022 California State Assembly 72nd district election
Primary election
Party	Candidate	Votes	%
Democratic	Judie Mancuso	59,016	43.3
Republican	Diane Dixon	58,132	42.7
Republican	Benjamin Yu	19,115	14.0
Total votes		136,263	100.0
General election
Republican	Diane Dixon	116,588	56.2
Democratic	Judie Mancuso	90,730	43.8
Total votes		207,318	100.0
Republican hold			

2024 California State Assembly 72nd district election
Primary election
Party	Candidate	Votes	%
Republican	Diane Dixon (incumbent)	87,904	60.9
Democratic	Dom Jones	56,374	39.1
Total votes		144,278	100.0
General election
Republican	Diane Dixon (incumbent)	157,278	59.5
Democratic	Dom Jones	107,251	40.5
Total votes		264,529	100.0
Republican hold			

=== Orange County Board of Supervisors - District 5 ===
==== 2026 ====
Primary election
Party	Candidate	Votes	%
	Katrina Foley (incumbent)	85,231	47.0
	Diane Dixon	84,932	46.8
	Lucy Vellema	11,264	6.2
Total votes		181,427	100.0

General election November 3, 2026
Party	Candidate	Votes	%
	Katrina Foley (incumbent)		
	Diane Dixon		
Total votes			
