= David Crump =

American legal scholar and writer

David Crump is the John B. Neibel Professor of Law at the University of Houston Law Center, where he teaches property law, civil procedure, evidence, legal practice strategies, criminal laws. Previously, he was the law school's Newell H. Blakely Professor of Law.

He attended Harvard College and received his Juris Doctor degree from the University of Texas School of Law in 1969. Crump then became affiliated with the law firms of Johnson & Gibbs and Haynes and Boone, among others.

He is also a ventriloquist, a rocket scientist, a guitarist in a country rock band, a poet, co-inventor of computer dating, with Douglas Ginsburg, and others, as well as an avid seniors amateur baseball player. In addition to numerous books dealing with property law, evidence, and practice strategies, he is the author of two works of legal fiction: Conflict of Interest and The Holding Company.

== References and notes ==
- University of Houston Profile

Specific
