= Jeremy Kernodle =

American federal judge (born 1976)

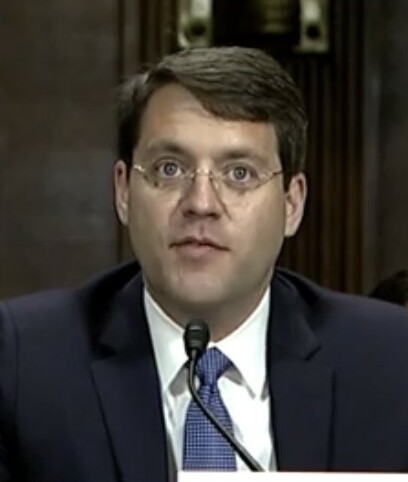

Judge of the United States District Court for the Eastern District of Texas
- Incumbent
- Assumed office November 2, 2018
- Appointed by: Donald Trump
- Preceded by: Michael H. Schneider Sr.

Personal details
- Born: Jeremy Daniel Kernodle; 1976 (age 49–50) Memphis, Tennessee, U.S.
- Party: Republican
- Education: Harding University (BA, BBA); Vanderbilt University (JD)

Jeremy Daniel Kernodle (born 1976) is an American lawyer and jurist serving since 2018 as a United States district judge of the United States District Court for the Eastern District of Texas.

== Early life and education ==
Kernodle was born in 1976 in Memphis, Tennessee. He graduated from Harding University in 1998 with joint Bachelor of Arts and Bachelor of Business Administration degrees, summa cum laude. He then attended the Vanderbilt University Law School, where he was an articles editor of the Vanderbilt Law Review. He graduated in 2001 ranked first in his class with a Juris Doctor with highest honors.

== Legal career ==
Upon graduation from law school, Kernodle served as a law clerk to Judge Gerald Bard Tjoflat of the U.S. Court of Appeals for the Eleventh Circuit from 2001 to 2002. He then practiced appellate and commercial litigation at Covington & Burling in Washington, D.C., as an associate. In 2005, he joined the Office of Legal Counsel in the United States Department of Justice as an attorney-advisor.

In 2006, he joined Haynes and Boone at the Dallas office as an associate from 2006 to 2012 and as a partner from 2012 to 2018, where he founded the False Claims Act practice group and worked on healthcare litigation. Kernodle was also a former president of the Dallas Chapters of the Federal Bar Association and the Federalist Society.

== Federal judicial service ==
On January 23, 2018, President Donald Trump nominated Kernodle to the seat on the United States District Court for the Eastern District of Texas vacated by Judge Michael H. Schneider Sr., who assumed senior status on January 7, 2016. On May 9, 2018, a hearing on his nomination was held before the Senate Judiciary Committee. On June 7, 2018, his nomination was reported out of committee by a 14–7 vote. On October 11, 2018, his nomination was confirmed by voice vote. He received his judicial commission on November 2, 2018.

=== Notable rulings ===
In December 2020, Texas Republican congressman Louis Gohmert filed a suit in Kernodle's federal district, naming vice president Mike Pence as a defendant, arguing that he has constitutional "sole discretion in determining which electoral votes to count for a given State" and violated his duty when counting electoral votes against incumbent Donald Trump. Pence and the Justice Department asked that the suit be dismissed, with the DOJ arguing that the suit "does not properly lie against the Vice President." Kernodle dismissed the suit, ruling that Gohmert and the other plaintiffs lacked standing.

In 2022, Consumers' Research, a non-profit educational organization, filed a lawsuit in Kernodle's court against the U.S. Consumer Product Safety Commission, an agency under the executive branch of the United States government. The plaintiffs argued that the president's inability to remove the agency's commissioners violated the principle of separation of powers and left the agency as an independent executive power without accountability. Kernodle ruled in favor of the plaintiffs on the basis of Article Two of the United States Constitution, which states that the "executive power shall be vested in a president of the United States of America." In March of 2022, the editorial board of The Wall Street Journal wrote that Kernodle's decision was an "assist to the Supreme Court in[...] reasserting the separation of powers as properly understood in the U.S. Constitution." The defendants appealed to the Fifth Circuit, which reversed Kernodle's ruling on the basis of the 1935 Supreme Court precedent known as Humphrey's Executor. The Circuit emphasized that any changes to such a precedent must be made by the Supreme Court. Plaintiffs appealed to the Supreme Court, which declined to consider the case.

In September 2024, the state of Texas filed a case against the United States Department of Health and Human Services, alleging that the department's recent rule requiring states to provide LGBTQ+ affirming placement for foster care youth was both financially impractical and a violation of prior Texas law. Plaintiffs sought to halt the application of the department's rule in Texas. Kernodle ruled in favor of the plaintiffs, writing that the new rule of gender-affirming care was not consistent with the original understanding of the federally-required "safe and proper care." Kernodle wrote that, if applied, the new rule would require "experimental and controversial treatment on our nation's most vulnerable: children in foster care. The problem for HHS here is that the agency lacks any statutory authority to do so."

In May 2025, the state of Texas filed a case alleging that three asset-management firms, BlackRock, Vanguard, and State Street, engaged in anti-competitive behavior against companies in the coal industry. If allowed to continue, the case would be among the highest-profile cases targeting environmental and other social-issue efforts. The defendants filed to dismiss the case in Kernodle's court, but Kernodle ruled that Texas had successfully found "enough circumstantial evidence to suggest that defendants agreed to collectively pressure coal companies to reduce the output of coal in the relevant markets and disclose future output information" and allowed the case to move forward.

Legal offices
Preceded by Michael H. Schneider Sr.	Judge of the United States District Court for the Eastern District of Texas; 2018–present	Incumbent
