= Erin Nealy Cox =

American attorney (born 1970)

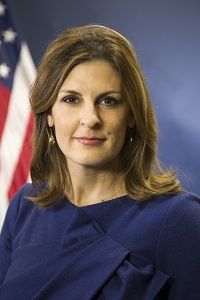

United States Attorney for the Northern District of Texas
- In office November 17, 2017 – January 8, 2021
- President: Donald Trump
- Preceded by: John Parker
- Succeeded by: Leigha Simonton

Personal details
- Born: Erin Angela Nealy; 1970 (age 55–56) Pascagoula, Mississippi
- Education: University of Texas at Austin (BBA); Southern Methodist University (JD)

Erin Nealy Cox (born 1970) is an American attorney who served as the United States Attorney for the United States District Court for the Northern District of Texas from 2017 to 2021. She was nominated to the position by President Donald Trump and confirmed by the U.S. Senate in 2017. After the 2020 election, she resigned effective January 9, 2021, and joined Kirkland & Ellis as a partner on June 23, 2021. Erin joined Walmart as their Chief Legal Officer in April 2026.

== Career ==
Nealy Cox graduated from the Southern Methodist University Dedman School of Law after receiving her business degree from the University of Texas. She clerked for Henry Anthony Politz when he was serving as Chief Judge of the United States Court of Appeals for the Fifth Circuit and for Barefoot Sanders when he was serving as a United States District Judge in the Northern District of Texas. From 1999 to 2008, Nealy Cox was an Assistant United States Attorney in the Northern District of Texas. In 2004 and 2005, she was chief of staff and senior counsel to the Assistant Attorney General in the Office of Legal Policy. Nealy Cox left the Department of Justice in 2008 and joined Stroz Friedberg, a cybersecurity and investigations consulting firm, where she established and led the company's Dallas office. Prior to assuming the role of United States Attorney, she was a senior advisor at McKinsey & Company in the cybersecurity and risk practice. She is on the board of directors of Sally Beauty Holdings. While at Kirkland & Ellis, Nealy Cox received endorsements from both Texas senators -- John Cornyn and Ted Cruz -- to fill the U.S. District Judge seat that was previously held by Barbara Lynn. She withdrew from consideration for that judicial post in March 2026 when she announced that she was taking a position as Walmart general counsel.

=== U.S. Attorney ===
As U.S. Attorney in the Northern District of Texas, Nealy Cox directed resources to crack down on sex trafficking, domestic violence, public corruption, gun crimes, and healthcare fraud. She advocated for bail reform and was instrumental in creating a DOJ-wide initiative aimed at prosecuting domestic abusers. She was co-chair of the Attorney General's Task Force on Violent Anti-Government Extremism, and she served on the Justice Department's Religious Liberty Task Force. She was one of five U.S. Attorneys who advised the China Initiative, a group of senior Justice Department officials tasked with fighting state-sponsored economic espionage. She served as chair of the Attorney General's Advisory Committee (AGAC), a body of 15 U.S. Attorneys selected by the Attorney General to advise on national priorities, including policy and operational issues. She also led the AGAC task force on domestic violence and firearms crimes.

=== Notable Prosecutions ===
==== Public Corruption ====
During Nealy Cox’s tenure as U.S. Attorney for the Northern District, public corruption was a priority. The office obtained notable indictments, including charges against Dallas City Council Member Carolyn Davis for accepting bribes from a land developer and against Dallas Mayor Pro Tem Dwaine Caraway in a bribery case involving a school bus agency. Davis pleaded guilty in 2019 before she died in a car accident caused by a drunk driver. Caraway was sentenced to four years and eight months in federal prison after pleading guilty to charges of conspiracy to commit honest services wire fraud and tax evasion.

==== Healthcare Fraud ====
During Nealy Cox’s tenure as U.S. Attorney for the Northern District of Texas, the office secured bribery and kickback convictions against a group of physicians and healthcare workers affiliated with Forest Park Medical Center in Dallas in a $40 million scheme involving patient referrals for surgery in exchange for monetary payments described as payments for marketing their practices. A total of 21 people were charged in the bribery scheme, which ran from 2009 to 2012. Ten pleaded guilty prior to trial. One, a lawyer, received a separate trial. Charges were dismissed against another, a doctor. Seven defendants, including four doctors, were convicted and one was acquitted in a jury trial.

==== Boeing 737 Disaster ====
While U.S. Attorney for the Northern District of Texas, the Justice Department's Criminal Division in Washington, D.C., oversaw the investigation and prosecution against Boeing for the 737 MAX disaster, which was filed in the U.S. District Court for the Northern District of Texas. The investigation resulted in a Delayed Prosecution Agreement (DPA) that included a total criminal monetary penalty and compensation of over $2.5 billion, including a criminal monetary penalty of $243.6 million and compensation to Boeing customers and the families of crash victims. In a lawsuit stemming from the DPA, some relatives of crash victims and their lawyers were critical of the agreement because it did not result in prosecution of Boeing executives. In addition, they were also initially critical that Nealy Cox later became a partner at Kirkland & Ellis, Boeing's lead corporate criminal defense law firm. However, on January 20, 2022, attorneys for 737 crash victims voluntarily requested removal of all claims about Nealy Cox from the court record, writing that they “acknowledge there is no basis upon which to allege any impropriety, ethical or otherwise, on [Cox's] part.” That motion was granted on January 21, 2022.

==== Opioids and Fentanyl ====
Under Nealy Cox's leadership, the office worked with local, state and federal law enforcement to interdict and respond to the opioid crisis. In 2019, an interagency Health Care Strikeforce that included Northern District prosecutors charged 58 people — including physicians, pharmacists and medical professionals — in a crackdown on illegal opioid distribution and insurance fraud. The fraud scheme totaled more than $66 million. According to the charges, doctors and pharmacists billed the government for millions of pills using fake IDs or purchased medical equipment that wasn't needed or used.

In Operation Wasted Days in 2019, Northern District prosecutors under Nealy Cox's direction obtained convictions against 49 defendants — including two doctors and five pharmacists — for conspiracy to possess with intent to distribute controlled substances as part of an $18 million pill mill scheme. According to the scheme, a network of recruiters enlisted and paid individuals from homeless shelters and other sources to obtain prescriptions from the doctors, who wrote the prescriptions knowing that they were being diverted from complicit pharmacies and sold for illicit use.

In 2019, Nealy Cox's office obtained restraining orders that enjoined Garland, Texas, doctors Leovares Mendez and Pena Rodriguez from practicing. An investigation found that the two profited from making fraudulent opioid prescriptions without any medical purpose. According to the complaint, the two doctors repeatedly issued prescriptions for controlled substances, including hydrocodone, alprazolam, and tramadol, to undercover agents posing as prospective new patients in exchange for $250 cash payments. The complaint alleges that the defendants issued prescriptions despite performing only minimal or perfunctory medical evaluations, at best, during the visits.

==== Domestic Terrorism and White Supremacy ====
In 2018, Northern District prosecutors obtained indictments and convictions of more than 150 individuals as part of a multi-agency crackdown on white supremacist organizations including the Aryan Circle, Aryan Brotherhood of Texas, Aryan Brotherhood, Peckerwoods, Soldiers of Aryan Culture and the Dirty White Boys. The investigation was handled by numerous law enforcement agencies coordinated by the Texas Anti-Gang Center, and the indictments included conspiracy to distribute methamphetamine and other illegal narcotics. It was the nation's largest prosecution of white supremacist gang affiliates.

==== Human Trafficking ====
Nealy Cox led efforts with the Department of Homeland Security to form a North Texas Trafficking Task Force to focus on human trafficking. In 2020, Northern District prosecutors shut down the CityxGuide website and arrested its owner, Wilhan Martono, on more than two dozen federal charges, including reckless disregard of sex trafficking, facilitating prostitution and money laundering. Martono was sentenced to 97 months in federal prison for promoting sex trafficking.
