= Leigha Simonton =

American lawyer

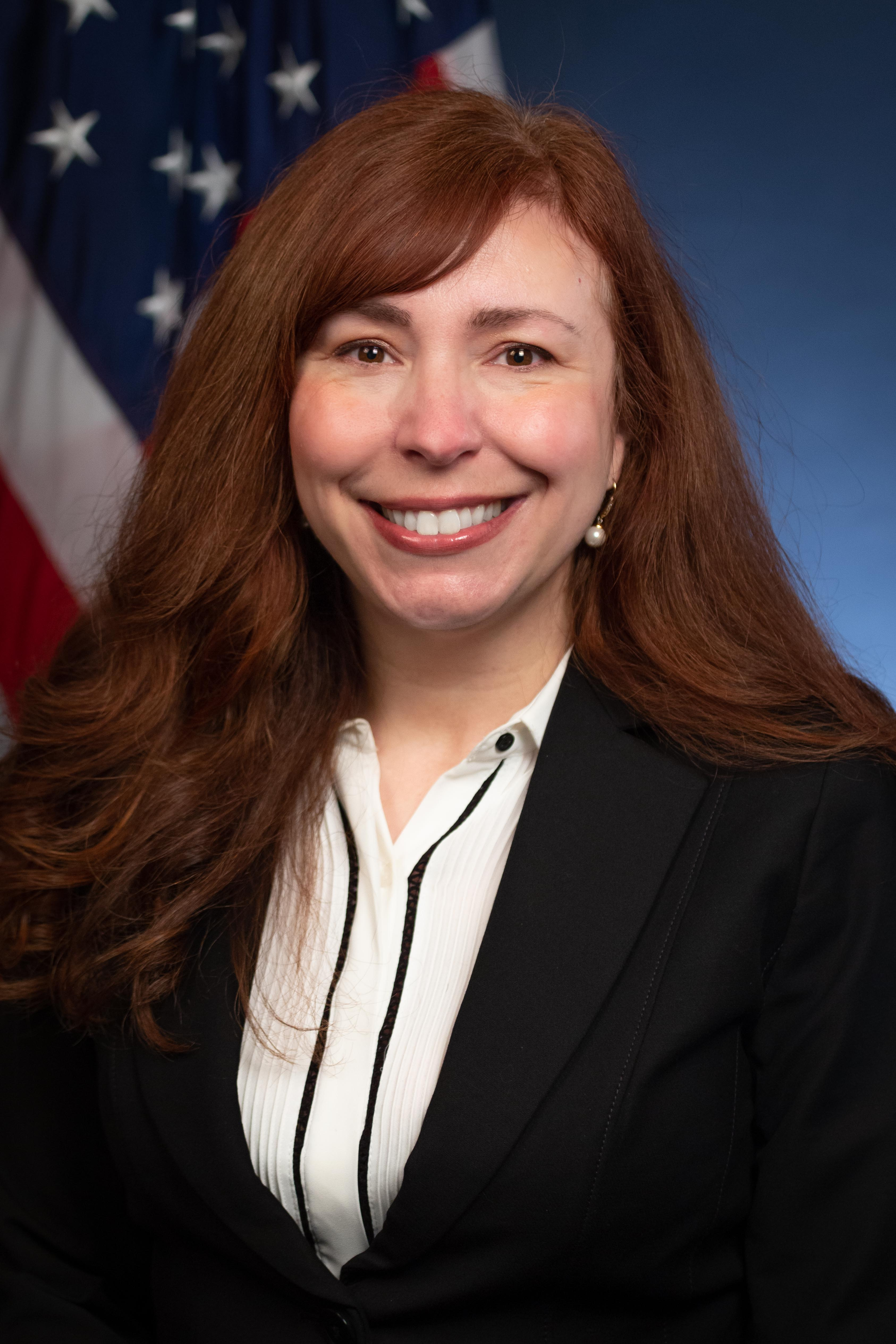

United States Attorney for the Northern District of Texas
- In office December 10, 2022 – January 19, 2025
- President: Joe Biden
- Preceded by: Erin Nealy Cox
- Succeeded by: TBD

Personal details
- Education: University of Texas at Austin (BA); Yale University (JD)

Leigha Amy Simonton is an American lawyer and former career federal prosecutor who served as United States Attorney for the Northern District of Texas from 2022 to 2025.

== Education ==
Simonton is originally from Louisiana and moved to the Dallas area as a teenager, where she attended L.V. Berkner High School in Richardson, Texas. She later earned a Bachelor of Arts with highest honors in history from the University of Texas at Austin in 1997, graduating early.

After working in the Chicago Public Schools system, she attended Yale Law School, graduating with a Juris Doctor in 2001. While there, she served as managing editor of the school's flagship law review, the Yale Law Journal, and won the John Fletcher Caskey Prize for Best Presentation of the Case at the school's annual Mock Trial Tournament finals. Her first summer in law school, she interned for the United States Attorney's Office for the Northern District of Texas.

== Career ==
After graduating from Yale, Simonton returned to Dallas to serve as a law clerk for Judge Barbara M.G. Lynn of the United States District Court for the Northern District of Texas from 2001 to 2002 and for Judge Patrick Higginbotham of the United States Court of Appeals for the Fifth Circuit from 2002 to 2003. From 2003 to 2005, she was an associate at Haynes and Boone in their Dallas office.

From 2005 to 2022, she served as an Assistant United States Attorney in the United States Attorney's Office for the Northern District of Texas. During her almost 18 years in this role, she served in several leadership roles within the office, including Appellate Chief and Deputy Appellate Chief. As an appellate prosecutor, she primarily defended convictions and sentences against defendants' appeals in the U.S. Court of Appeals for the Fifth Circuit. She presented oral argument more than 20 times and acted as sole counsel in almost 400 criminal appeals. She also prosecuted cases at the trial-court level and provided extensive appellate advisory support to numerous trial teams throughout the district.

In 2014, Simonton won the Director's Award from the Department of Justice's Executive Office for U.S. Attorneys for her multi-year trial and appellate work on the Dallas City Hall corruption case involving former Mayor Pro Tem Don Hill, his wife Sheila Farrington, former City Plan & Zoning Commissioner D'Angelo Lee, and several other defendants. Later, she led her office in overturning a three-judge panel decision in the Fifth Circuit Court of Appeals that had suppressed key evidence in a child exploitation case. After successfully petitioning for the full Court of Appeals to review the three-judge decision, the full Court disagreed with the three-judge ruling and allowed the government use of that evidence.

=== U.S. Attorney for the Northern District of Texas ===
On October 14, 2022, President Joe Biden announced his intent to nominate Simonton to be the United States Attorney for the Northern District of Texas. On November 14, 2022, her nomination was sent to the United States Senate. Simonton was recommended to the post by Senators John Cornyn and Ted Cruz. On November 17, 2022, her nomination was reported out of committee by a voice vote. On December 6, 2022, her nomination was confirmed in the Senate by voice vote. She was sworn in by District Judge Barbara M.G. Lynn on December 10, 2022.

=== Accomplishments while U.S. Attorney ===
Under Simonton's leadership, the U.S. Attorney's Office tried its highest number of cases in over a decade. Simonton actively supervised several high-profile jury trials, including the trial of Dr. Raynaldo Ortiz, an anesthesiologist convicted of injecting heart-stopping drugs into patient IV bags; Christopher Kirchner, the founder of the company Slync, whom a jury convicted of defrauding investors out of more than $25 million; and Holly Elkins, a woman convicted of helping her fiancé cyberstalk and ultimately murder his former girlfriend and mother of his child.

She also oversaw the charging of a Russian national for using the BitPaymer ransomware variant to attack numerous victims throughout the United States and the sentencing of a Ukrainian national for demanding over $700 million in ransom payments using the REvil ransomware variant. Other notable cases included charges against 14 individuals in the largest case investigated by the Pandemic Response Accountability Committee Fraud Task Force at the time of its indictment for allegedly bilking the Paycheck Protection Program and numerous financial institutions out of more than $53 million, charges against a Texas Christian University divinity professor for possessing child pornography, the sentencing of a retired Cook Children's Hospital Chaplain for producing child pornography, the sentencing of a would-be bomber who idolized the Columbine High school shooters, and the sentencing of another man who set off a bomb in his backyard and plotted to blow up a high school.

During her tenure, Simonton also oversaw the prosecution of 11 drug traffickers charged in the wake of the juvenile fentanyl overdose scandal, which claimed the lives of four Carrollton-area middle and high schoolers and injured 10 more. In the wake of these tragedies, Simonton launched the "Protect Our Children Project," aimed at bringing federal resources to bear on issues affecting schools, including fentanyl use. She hosted a series of webinars for hundreds of North Texas school administrators that covered the dangers of fentanyl, how to respond to an overdose, and how to discourage teens from using the drug. She also visited several area colleges to share the dangers of fentanyl with young adults. And, last summer, along with the other Texas U.S. Attorneys, she met in Austin with the heads of all Texas regional education service centers to provide important information and resources on fentanyl that they could use in Texas public schools.

Simonton also focused on curbing violent crime in North Texas, and the violent crime rate fell in major North Texas cities during that time. She prioritized prosecution of violent recidivists and launched Operation Take Aim in the summer of 2023 to further target such offenders. And she partnered with the other Texas U.S. Attorneys and the ATF in the summer of 2024 to launch "Operation Texas Kill Switch," a statewide initiative to combat the illegal use of machine gun conversion devices, also known as "switches." The operation, which included a partnership with CrimeStoppers, raised public awareness of the dangers of switches, generated multiple tips, and resulted in numerous ongoing prosecutions.

The Civil and Appellate Divisions also logged notable successes under Simonton's stewardship. Simonton oversaw the creation and implementation of the district's new Voluntary Self-Disclosure policy, incentivizing companies to quickly detect, disclose, and remediate suspected misconduct, and negotiated settlements in several self-disclosure cases. For instance, the Civil Division negotiated a $14.2 million settlement with Horizon Medical Center of Denton for potential violations of Medicare regulations and the physician self-referral law and an $18.4 million settlement with Consolidated Nuclear Security LLC (CNS) after CNS self-disclosed that it submitted false claims for payment to the National Nuclear Security Administration related to the Pantex Plant—the nation's primary facility for the assembly, disassembly, and retrofitting of nuclear weapons. Further, the Civil Division negotiated a $4.5 million settlement with a 3D printing company that allegedly transmitted technical data to China in violation of export control laws and obtained $1.2 million in judgments against two doctors who prescribed hydrocodone to drug-seekers without legitimate medical purpose.

Meanwhile, under her leadership, the Appellate Division persuaded the Fifth Circuit to affirm the life sentence of a Michigan man who stalked, transported, and sexually assaulted a 14-year-old girl, convinced the Fifth Circuit that a retrial in a city-council bribery case would not violate double jeopardy, and successfully defended against 19 issues on appeal arising from the Forest Park Medical Center kickback case. The Appellate Division also successfully defended the conviction of four UDF executives who misled investors and the SEC about their investment fund's performance; the Fifth Circuit upheld the conviction, citing the government's "avalanche of evidence" proving its case, and the Supreme Court later denied cert, allowing the Fifth Circuit decision to stand.

Simonton also oversaw the progress of the U.S. v. Rahimi case—charged in the Northern District of Texas—through the Fifth Circuit to the U.S. Supreme Court. She supported the Solicitor General's efforts seeking certiorari of the Fifth Circuit's decision invalidating Rahimi's conviction for using a firearm while under a domestic violence protection order. After the Supreme Court granted cert, she attended the oral argument as a guest of the Solicitor General, and the Supreme Court later decided 8-1 that Rahimi's statute of conviction was constitutional under the Second Amendment. The Rahimi case originated from the Northern District of Texas's Domestic Violence Initiative, which targets domestic abusers for federal prosecution and resulted, during Simonton's tenure, in cases such as the sentencing of a San Diego man to life in prison for traveling to Texas and killing his boyfriend, and the sentencing of a felon domestic abuser to 10 years in prison for violating his supervised release by attacking his partner. As U.S. Attorney, Simonton was an outspoken advocate for domestic violence awareness, partnering with regional and national domestic violence organizations, holding press conferences with the other Texas U.S. Attorneys to honor Texas domestic violence victims, and sharing resources with other U.S. Attorney's Offices so they could create their own domestic abuser prosecution programs.

Throughout her time in office, Simonton and her staff actively supported other especially vulnerable communities, including religious communities. She held hate-crime seminars for Jewish and Muslim community leaders and oversaw hate-crimes prosecutions that resulted in the sentencing of a Dallas man to 37 years after he shot five individuals, killing one, at a tire shop because it was a Muslim-owned business, and the sentencing of an Amarillo man for threatening to execute three Jewish rabbis.

Simonton further attempted to stem the tide of defendants who make their way into the federal system, revitalizing and expanding the district's Project Safe Neighborhood Re-Entry Night program, which educates individuals on state parole and probation about avoiding behaviors, like drug trafficking and gun possession, that could end up in federal prosecution, and connects them with community resources—like therapy, addiction, and job placement programs—to live productive lives. During her tenure, thousands of such individuals across the district attended these programs, and the vast majority have not reoffended. Further, Simonton and her staff created events to foster positive relationships between residents of high-crime communities and the law enforcement officers who serve them, such as adopting neighborhood schools, holding book fairs staffed by U.S. Attorney's Office personnel and law enforcement officers, and having officers read books to preschoolers via the office's "Pre-K Reading Program."

=== Post-U.S. Attorney work ===
On February 5, 2025, Simonton announced that, in April, she would enter private practice as a Member of the law firm Dykema Gossett, PLLC, where she would launch a Texas-based branch of its white collar, government investigations, and compliance practice and would also continue her appellate work with a particular focus on the U.S. Court of Appeals for the Fifth Circuit.

Legal offices
Preceded by Erin Nealy Cox	United States Attorney for the Northern District of Texas; 2022–2025	Incumbent
