= Trinity Industries =

American company

Trinity Industries, Inc.
- Type: Public company
- Traded as: NYSE: TRN; S&P 600 component
- Industry: Conglomerate
- Founded: 1933; 93 years ago
- Headquarters: Dallas, Texas, U.S.
- Key people: E. Jean Savage (CEO, and president); James E. Perry (CFO and vice president); D. Stephen Menzies (senior vice president; group president of Trinity Rail); William A. McWhirter (senior vice president; group president)
- Revenue: ▼US$2.16 billion (2025)
- Net income: ▲US$253 million (2025)
- Number of employees: 15,605 (2017)
- Website: www.trin.net

Trinity Industries Inc. is an American industrial corporation that owns a variety of businesses which provide products and services to the industrial, energy, transportation and construction sectors.

Now, the company has five business groups, which are Rail Group, Construction Products Group, Inland Barge Group, Energy Equipment Group, and Railcar Leasing & Management Services Group.

== History ==
=== Founding ===
The company, first known as Trinity Steel, was founded by C. J. Bender in Dallas in 1933. W. Ray Wallace, an engineering graduate of Louisiana Tech, worked for Dallas's Austin Bridge Company in 1944 before joining the company in 1946 as its seventeenth employee. At the time Trinity Steel manufactured butane tanks in a Dallas County mule barn. In 1958 Trinity Steel merged with Dallas Tank Company, which was also founded in 1933, and Ray Wallace became the new firm's president and first chief executive officer. At the time Trinity had revenues reaching $2.5 million and employed 200 workers. While some employees of the firm in other states eventually unionized, Texas workers never formed a union. For a time the company profited by producing larger tanks that enabled it to enter the petroleum business and do steel fabrication for refineries. In addition, to free up capital, it established an investment company to buy trucks and lease them back to the firm. Nonetheless, by 1957 Trinity faced competition and declines in the petroleum industry. Dallas Tank, Trinity Steel, and Bender-Wallace Development Company merged in 1958 to form Trinity Industries, Incorporated, and went public.

=== 1970s ===
In 1970 Trinity diversified with the acquisition of 153 acres (0.62 km^{2}) of land adjacent to the Dallas-Fort Worth International Airport and in 1971 established its first real estate subsidiary. Acquisition of Mosher Steel in 1973, after initially contracting work out to them, enhanced the company's structural business. Among projects completed by the firm's structural division were the Texas Stadium, New York's World Trade Center, the Balboa Bridge in Panama, the Pennzoil Building, and two buildings in Moscow. Although Trinity began fabricating railway tank car bodies as a subcontractor to Richmond Tank Car and Union Tank Car as early as 1966, in 1978 Trinity began producing complete tank and covered hopper rail cars in association with Quick Car of Fort Worth, Texas, which Trinity later absorbed.

=== 1980s ===
By the 1980s two subsidiaries, Gamble's Incorporated of Alabama and Mosher Steel of Texas, manufactured structural products including materials for drilling platforms, highway bridge components, commercial-high-rise buildings, and other girders and beams. The firm's marine subsidiary, Equitable Shipyards, produced LASH or Lighter Aboard Ship barges, riverboats for use by Hilton Hotels, and other craft for industrial uses. Hackney, Incorporated, its metal components subsidiary, produced materials for piping systems. Trinity produced completed railcars, including tank cars, covered and open hoppers, and gondolas to transport chemicals, coal, structural steel and other commodities, at locations in Oklahoma City, Oklahoma, and Longview, Texas, and held two railcar leasing subsidiaries. The company also produced containers for fertilizer, liquified petroleum gas, and nuclear fuel and waste. In 1981 Trinity acquired a metal fabrication firm at Channelview, Texas, and Babcock & Wilcox plants in Elkhart, Indiana, and Koppel, Pennsylvania, and in 1983 it acquired Halter Marine. In 1984 Trinity absorbed Quick Car and acquired the railcar designs and production facilities of the Pullman-Standard Car Manufacturing Company, once the largest railcar manufacturer in North America. That same year Trinity also acquired the railcar designs of General American Transportation Corporation. In 1986 the rail car designs and production facilities of Greenville Steel Car Company were purchased, including the auto rack designs of Portec-Paragon. Also acquired in 1986 were the railcar designs of North American Car Corporation, and in 1987 Ortner Freight Car was acquired. These combined acquisitions made Trinity the largest rail car manufacturer in North America.

=== 1990s ===
"In the 1990s expansion continued with the acquisition of the Transit Mix Concrete and Materials Company of Beaumont, Texas, Beiard Industries, Syro Steel and Stearns Airport Equipment of Fort Worth, Texas. By 1993 revenues exceeded $1.5 billion, and the firm employed 13,000 people." In 1998 Trinity acquired the Differential Steel Car Company (DIFCO), which designed and built specialty rail cars. That same year Trinity also opened a rail car production plant in Monclova, Mexico.

=== 2000s ===
In 2001 Trinity Industries acquired the designs and production facilities of Thrall Car Manufacturing Company.

In 2002-2003, Trinity consolidated its rail car building operations under the name Trinity Rail Group (TRG), and then shortened the name to TrinityRail.

In June 2006, the company completed the sale of its weld pipe fittings business. In August the same year, the company sold its European Rail business to International Railway Systems S.A. At the end of the year, on December 31, the company made two acquisitions in the Construction Products Group.

In April 2007, the company's subsidiary, Transit Mix Concrete & Materials Company, acquired a combined group of East Texas asphalt, ready mix concrete and aggregates businesses operating under the name Armor Materials.

In November 2018, the company’s Energy Equipment Group, Trinity Containers, spun off and formed Arcosa Inc. (NYSE - ACA).

In 2020, Jean Savage became the first woman and non family member to run the company as CEO and president.

Trinity sold off Trinity Highway Products, LLC in November 2021 to private equity firm Monomoy Capital in a $375 million cash deal.

The company purchased Montreal, Quebec-based Holden America in December 2022.

In March 2023, the company acquired RSI Logistics for a reported $70 million deal.

== Products ==
=== Rail Group - TrinityRail ===
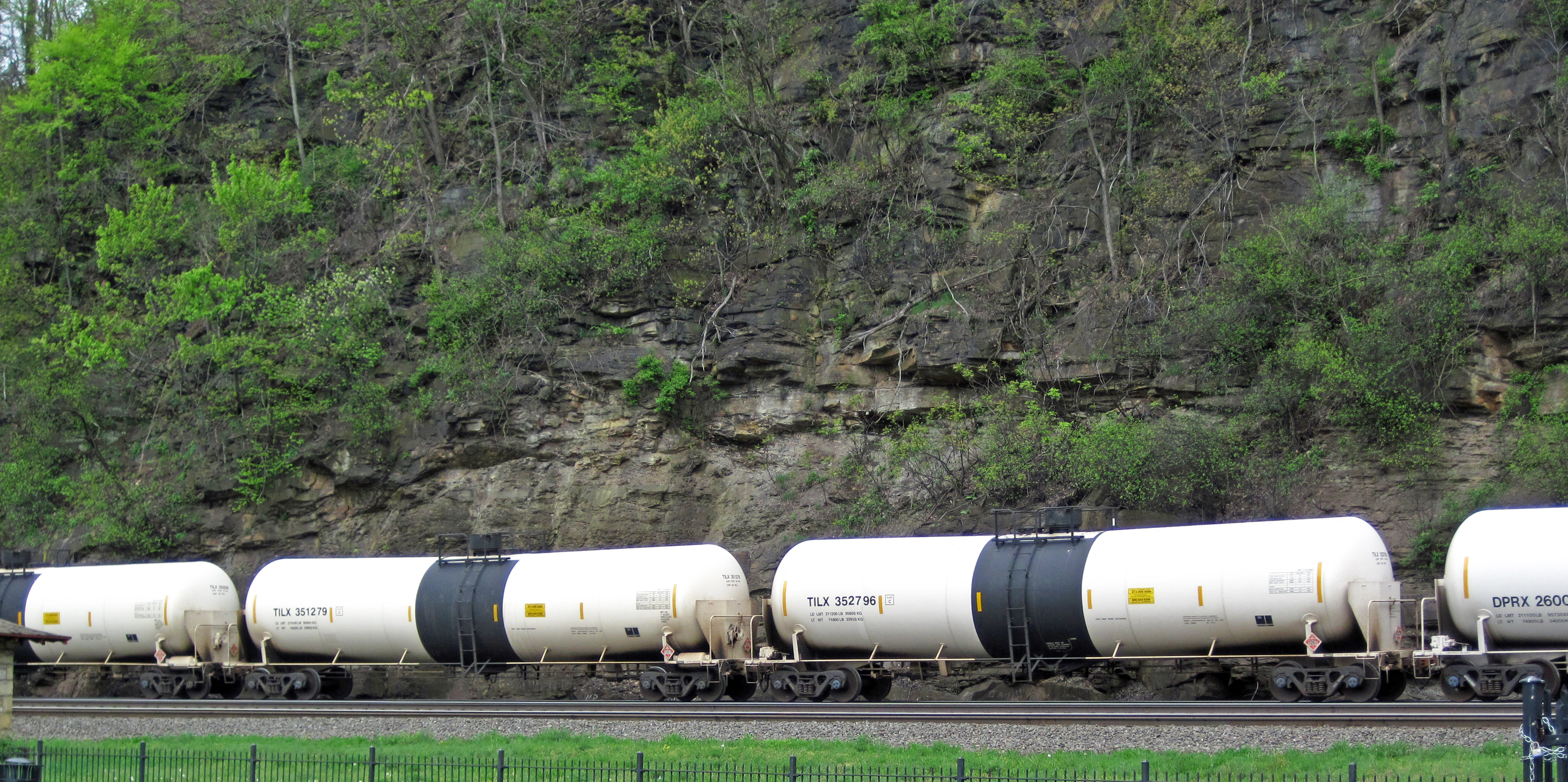
Trinity Industries Leasing tank cars on the Norfolk Southern Railway

TrinityRail manufactures and sells railroad cars (hopper cars, gondolas, flat cars, autoracks, intermodal cars, tank cars, and boxcars) and component parts. Its customers include railroads, leasing companies and shippers of products.

=== Construction Products Group ===
The group produces concrete, aggregates, highway products, beams and girders used in highway bridge construction. Its customers include contractors and subcontractors in the construction and foundation industry.

=== Inland Barge Group ===
The group manufactures dry-cargo barges and hopper barges.

=== Energy Equipment Group - Trinity Containers spin-off ===
In 2018, the group was spun off forming Arcosa, Inc., d/b/a ARCOSA Tank, that manufactures containers including pressure vessels, storage tanks, as well as gas cylinders for propane and anhydrous ammonia storage.

=== Railcar Leasing and Management Services Group ===
The group provides fleet management, maintenance and leasing services.

Trinity Industries Leasing operates DOT-111 tank cars for lease in North America.

== Guardrail controversies ==
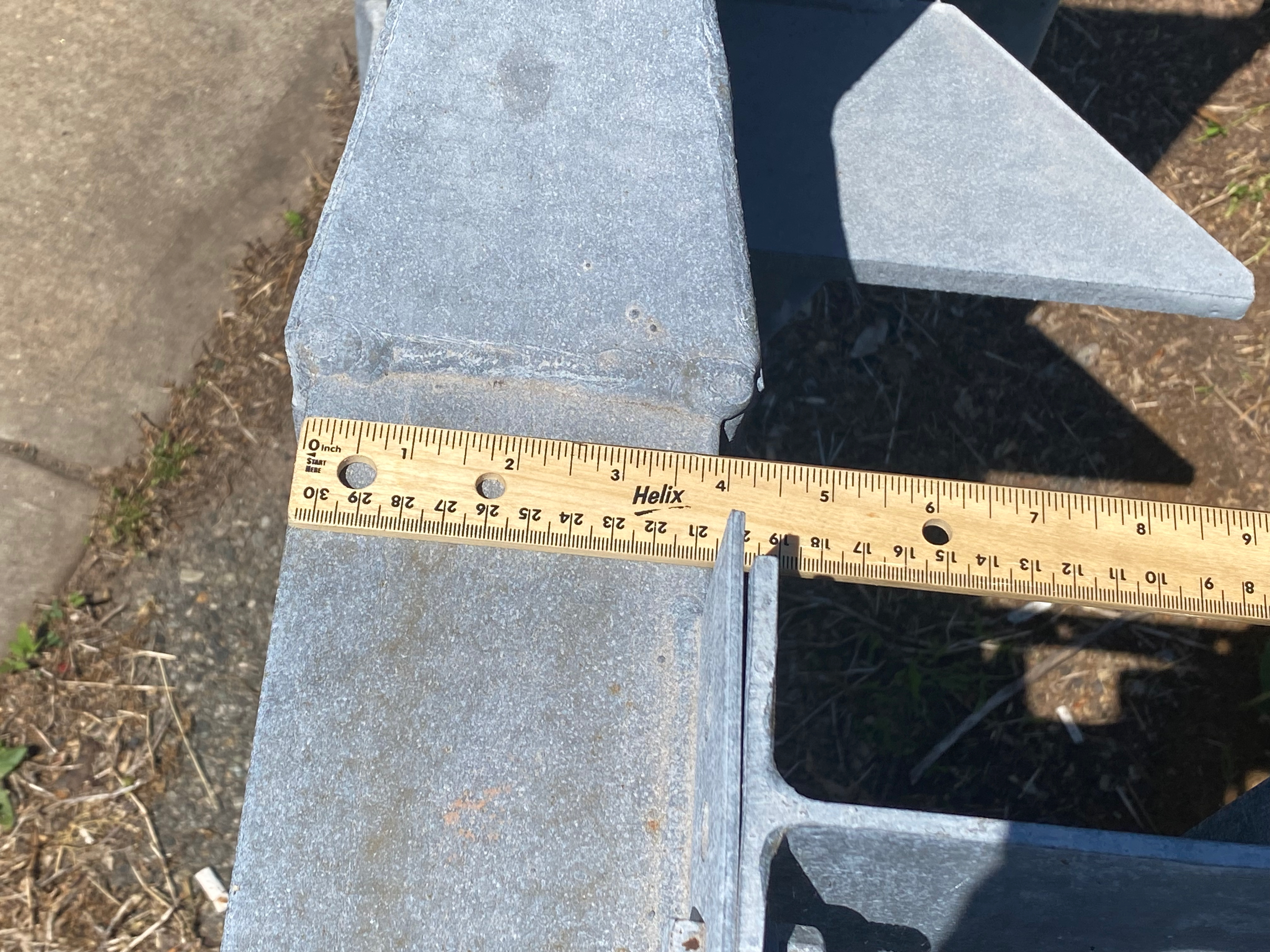
ET-Plus with 4-inch channel

In March 2012, Joshua Harman, co-owner of guardrail manufacturing and installation companies SPIG Industry and Selco Construction Services, filed a federal False Claims Act (FCA) suit against Trinity Highway Products, LLC. Trinity manufactures under license the ET Plus System—a guardrail end terminal system designed by the Texas A&M Transportation Institute (TTI). Mr. Harman alleged that Trinity did not properly notify the Federal Highway Administration (FHWA) in 2005 when Trinity changed the ET Plus guide channel from five inches to four. Trinity made the modification upon the recommendation of TTI which had successfully crash-tested the product, it was revealed in a series of investigative articles published by television station WPRI-TV in May 2014. Prior to May 18, 2015, FHWA did not expect product submitters to notify FHWA of “non-significant” modifications if the modification was thought to have no effect on how the device would slow, stop or redirect a vehicle. Harman further alleged that these were cost-cutting changes that resulted in unsafe products being deployed on U.S. highways. Automobile accidents involving the ET Plus System have involved guardrails penetrating vehicles and causing injury to occupants although subsequent testing resulted in findings that no unique performance limitations could be attributed to the ET-Plus as manufactured, that there are real-world conditions that exceed the performance expectation of all end terminal systems, and that installation, maintenance and repair were factors affecting the product’s performance. Lawsuits regarding the guardrails causing injury to motorists were pending in U.S. courts in 2014.

In October, 2014, the federal lawsuit resulted in a fraud jury verdict of $175 million which under FCA was tripled to $525 million. In June 2015, the U.S. District Court in the Eastern District of Texas certified the verdict and assessed the final penalty at $663 million. By 2016, Trinity had appealed the case to the Fifth Circuit Court of Appeals, which reversed the trial court and entered judgment in favor of Trinity in 2017.

In January 2014, Nevada suspended the use of the Trinity guardrails due to its then belief that Trinity was required to disclosure the ITT recommended guide channel change. By October 2014, 14 states had suspended new installations of the Trinity guardrail end terminal. A report by the University of Alabama at Birmingham which examined data from almost a decade of crash reports concluded the ET Plus guardrail end terminal to be nearly three times more likely to result in fatality than the previous version of the end terminal. In January 2015, the FHWA commissioned a peer review of the University of Alabama at Birmingham report. All four reviewers raised concerns about limitations or flaws in the study’s methodology, which led all of the reviewers to question the validity of the study’s findings and conclusions. In October 2014, the FHWA issued a memorandum requesting information from state transportation departments regarding the ET Plus performance. In addition, the FHWA requested the guardrail be retested. Trinity voluntarily stopped shipping the ET Plus until the additional crash testing requested by the FHWA could be completed. Up to that point, 42 states had stopped installation of new ET Plus guardrails pending further testing.

Trinity conducted a series of eight crash tests at 27-inch and 31-inch heights to conform to the prevailing standard for guardrails of this type per the National Cooperative Highway Research Program (NCHRP) Report 350. After a review by the FHWA and an independent expert, in March 2015 the FHWA announced that the ET Plus as sold by Trinity passed all eight crash tests, and that the product remained eligible for federal reimbursement.

In March 2015, the Virginia Department of Transportation announced plans to replace ET Plus guardrails.

In March 2015, federal officials said the TTI modified design manufactured by Trinity Highway Products met safety standards during crash tests.

In September 2015, The FHWA and the American Association of State Highway and Transportation Officials published a joint task force report titled, “Safety Analysis of Extruding W-Beam Guardrail End Terminal Crashes.” The report concluded that there are no unique performance limitations that can be attributed to the ET-Plus as manufactured, that there are real-world conditions that exceed the performance expectation of all end terminal systems, and that additional crash testing of all existing NCHRP Report 350-compliant end terminals would be irrelevant and uninformative. The report also cited installation, maintenance and repair as factors affecting product performance.

On October 23, 2015, Trinity Highway Products announced that it would resume shipping the ET-Plus "after meeting safety standards in crash tests" to fill orders as they come in.

On November 5, 2015, a class action lawsuit was filed by counties in Missouri, including the city of St. Louis, Missouri, and the state’s transportation authority, against Trinity Industries and Trinity Highway Products alleging that the ET-Plus guardrails were defective and dangerous.

On September 29, 2017 the US Court of Appeals for the Fifth Circuit reversed the District Court and entered judgment in favor of Trinity in United States ex rel. Harman v. Trinity Indus. Inc., 872 F.3d 645 (5th Cir., 2017).

In November 2021, Trinity Industries sold off Trinity Highway Products to the private equity firm Monomoy Capital in a $375 million cash deal.

In 2022, Trinity Industries and Trinity Highway Products agreed to a $56 million settlement of the class action lawsuit that had been filed on November 5, 2015, involving counties in Missouri and the state’s transportation authority.

== See also ==
- List of rolling stock manufacturers
- List of Texas companies (T)
