= Conflict of Interest (novel) =

1997 novel by David Crump

- Author: David Crump
- Language: English
- Genre: Legal thriller
- Publisher: Strawberry Hill Press
- Publication date: 1997
- Publication place: United States
- Media type: Print (paperback)
- Pages: 228 pages (mass-market paperback)
- ISBN: 0-89407-122-X
- OCLC: 36824704
- Dewey Decimal: 813/.54 21
- LC Class: PS3553.R783 C66 1997

Conflict of Interest is a legal/suspense thriller written by David Crump in 1997. A paperback edition was published by Strawberry Hill Press in that year.
