= Joshua Harman =

- Occupations: Entrepreneur, highway safety advocate
- Years active: 1988-present
- Known for: Trinity Industries whistleblower lawsuit; co-founder of SPIG Industry

Joshua Harman is an American entrepreneur, highway safety advocate, and whistleblower based in Bristol, Virginia. He is the co-founder of Selco Construction Services and SPIG Industry LLC, a highway guardrail manufacturing company. Harman is best known for filing a False Claims Act qui tam lawsuit against Trinity Industries over its ET-Plus guardrail end terminal, alleging the company had made undisclosed design changes that compromised the safety of the device. A federal jury awarded a $663 million judgment in 2015, the largest whistleblower verdict obtained without the assistance of the United States Department of Justice. The judgment was overturned on appeal, with Trinity arguing that even if the design changes were not disclosed, the omissions were not material to the government's payment decisions. The ET-Plus end terminal was subsequently discontinued and lost its eligibility for federal-aid reimbursement on December 31, 2017, after failing to meet the safety criteria set forth in the AASHTO Manual for Assessing Safety Hardware (MASH).

== Early life and career ==
In 1988, Harman and his brother Chris co-founded Selco Construction Services as teenagers in Bristol, Virginia. The company initially planted vegetation along roads and highways before expanding into fencing and guardrail installation.

== SPIG Industry ==
In 2007, Harman and his brother Chris co-founded SPIG Industry LLC (Safety Products & Innovations in Guardrail) as a manufacturer of highway guardrail safety products. The company operates out of a 40,000-square-foot manufacturing facility in Bristol, Virginia.

SPIG manufactures the SGET End Terminal, a crash cushion device designed to absorb and dissipate the energy created during head-on vehicle impacts. The SGET was awarded federal-aid reimbursement eligibility by the Federal Highway Administration in July 2025, receiving control number CC-184. The device underwent crash testing in accordance with AASHTO MASH standards at Test Level 3, and has been approved for use in 14 states.

== Trinity Industries Whistleblower Lawsuit ==
=== Origins ===
In 2011, Trinity Industries filed a patent infringement lawsuit against Harman's companies, alleging that they sold guardrail terminals similar to Trinity's ET-Plus system. During the course of the patent dispute, Harman became concerned about the safety of the ET-Plus system and began conducting his own investigation of guardrail accident sites across multiple states. His research documented over 40 deaths and more than 100 injuries involving the redesigned ET-Plus terminals, which had been modified and put into production beginning in 2005.

Harman discovered that Trinity had made five undisclosed modifications to the ET-Plus system, including narrowing the guide channel from five inches to four inches, without notifying the Federal Highway Administration. He alleged that these changes caused the terminal to lock up during crashes rather than allowing the guardrail to safely slide through, resulting in the metal rail being driven into vehicles upon impact. To raise public awareness, Harman created the website failingheads.com to compile photographic evidence from accident scenes.

=== False Claims Act Lawsuit ===
In 2012, Harman filed a qui tam lawsuit against Trinity Industries under the False Claims Act, alleging that Trinity had defrauded the federal government by seeking reimbursement eligibility for a safety device that had been materially altered without disclosure. The case proceeded without the involvement of the United States Department of Justice, with Harman and his legal team pursuing the action independently.

In October 2014, a federal jury in the U.S. District Court in Marshall, Texas found that Trinity had defrauded the government of $175 million through the undisclosed changes to the ET-Plus. The Commonwealth of Virginia subsequently joined the litigation in December 2014.

In June 2015, the presiding judge trebled the damages and assessed a total judgment of $663 million against Trinity Industries. Harman was awarded approximately $199 million, representing 30 percent of the judgment, plus $19 million in court fees — making it the largest whistleblower verdict in U.S. history obtained without DOJ backing.

=== Appeal and Reversal ===
Trinity Industries appealed the verdict. In October 2017, the United States Court of Appeals for the Fifth Circuit reversed the trial court judgment and rendered judgment as a matter of law in favor of Trinity. The appellate court held that because the FHWA had maintained that the ET-Plus remained eligible for federal reimbursement throughout the controversy, Trinity's failure to disclose the design changes was not material to the government's payment decisions under the False Claims Act's materiality standard.

Despite the reversal, the case drew significant public attention to guardrail safety standards and the regulatory oversight of highway safety devices. The ET-Plus end terminal subsequently lost its federal-aid reimbursement eligibility on December 31, 2017, after failing to meet updated MASH safety criteria. In 2021, Trinity divested its highway products business.
