= Newport Beach City Council =

Governing body of Newport Beach, California

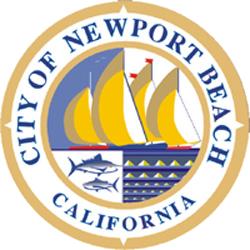

Type
- Type: Unicameral
- Term limits: 2 Terms (Consecutively)

Leadership
- Mayor: Lauren Kleiman, R
- Mayor Pro Tem: Noah Blom, R

Structure
- Seats: 7
- Political groups: Officially Nonpartisan: Republican (7)
- Length of term: 4 Years

Elections
- Voting system: At-large
- Last election: November 5, 2024
- Next election: November 3, 2026

Meeting place
- City Council Chambers 100 Civic Center Drive, Newport Beach, CA, 92660

Website
- Official Website

The Newport Beach City Council is the governing body of Newport Beach, California. The city operates under council-manager government, where the members of the city council appoint the Mayor and Mayor Pro Tempore. City council members may only serve two consecutive four-year terms.

== Elections ==
Either three or four Councilmembers are elected at-large during each presidential election to represent their districts. The remaining seats have an election during the midterms.

== Composition ==
The Newport Beach City Council entirely consists of 7 Republicans, though per state law, the council is officially non-partisan.

| District (At-Large) | Councilmember | Party (Nonpartisan) |
|---|---|---|
| 1 | Joe Stapleton | Republican |
| 2 | Michelle Barto | Republican |
| 3 | Erik Weigand | Republican |
| 4 | Robyn Grant | Republican |
| 5 | Noah Blom (Mayor Pro Tem) | Republican |
| 6 | Lauren Kleiman (Mayor) | Republican |
| 7 | Sara J. Weber | Republican |
