= Trex Company, Inc. =

American building materials company

- Type: Public company
- Traded as: NYSE: TREX; S&P 400 component
- Industry: Industrials
- Founded: August 1996; 30 years ago
- Headquarters: Winchester, Virginia, U.S.
- Area served: United States, International
- Key people: Bryan H. Fairbanks (president and CEO); James E. Cline (Chairman of the Board)
- Products: decking, railing, fascia, cladding, fencing, fasteners, outdoor lighting
- Revenue: ▲US$1.2 billion (2024)
- Operating income: ▲US$305 million (2024)
- Net income: ▲US$226 million (2024)
- Total assets: ▲US$1.3 million (2024)
- Number of employees: 1,838 (December 31, 2024)
- Website: trex.com

Trex Company, Inc. is a manufacturer of wood-alternative composite decking, residential railing, and other outdoor items made from recycled materials. Its headquarters is in Winchester, Virginia. The company distributes its products through a network of more than 6,700 retail outlets across six continents.

Trex composite decking products are made of up to 95% recycled materials. In redirecting more than 300 million pounds of plastic and scrap wood from landfills each year, Trex is one of the largest plastic film recyclers in North America. Since its founding in 1996, the company has diverted more than 5 billion pounds of polyethylene plastic from landfills and waterways.

== Company history ==
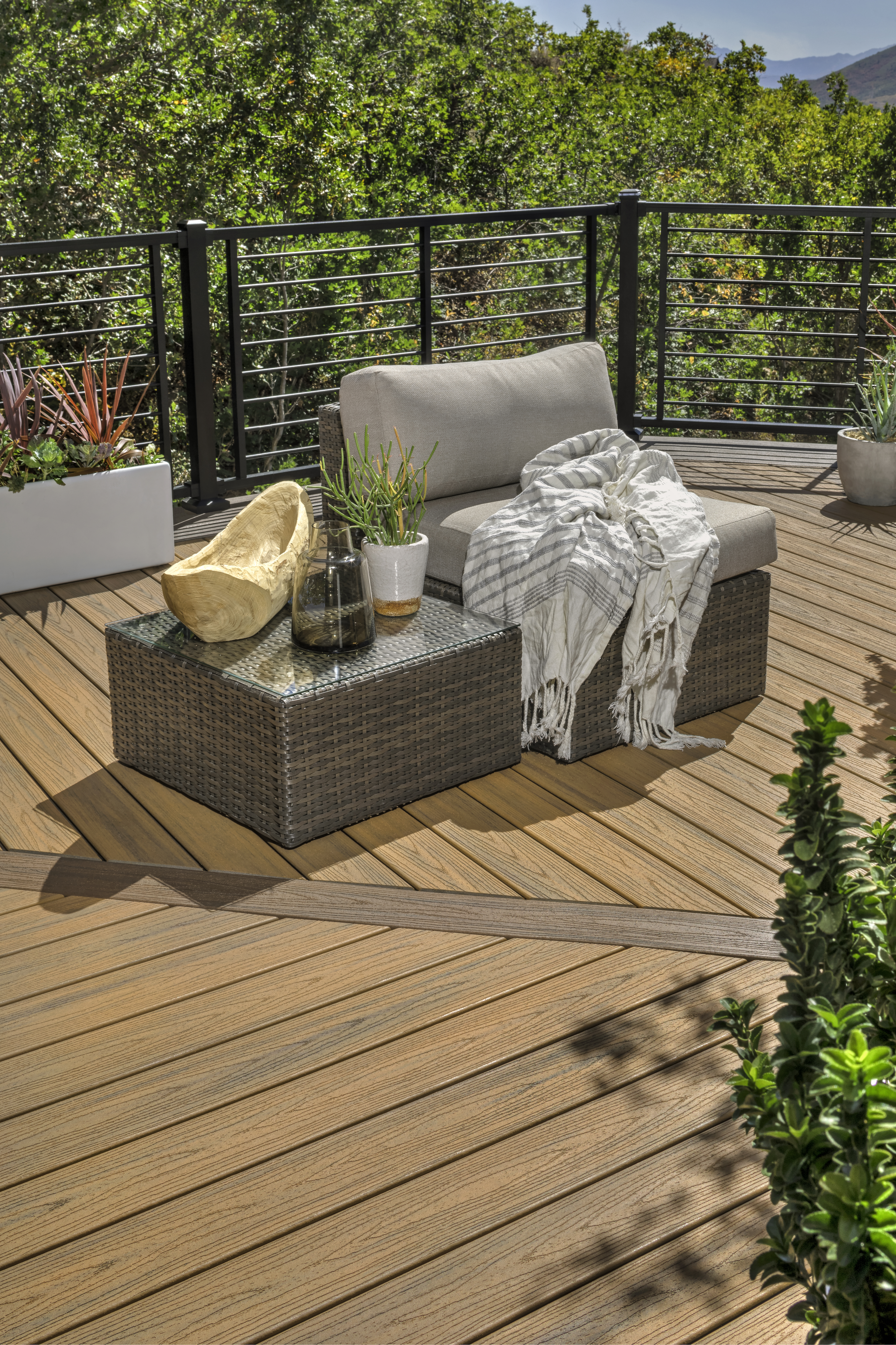
Trex composite decking

In 1988, Roger Wittenberg combined sawdust and plastic bags, a material known as Revenite, to create a park bench. In 1996, Mobil Chemical Co. acquired Wittenberg's technology for $10 million and formed Trex, LLC. Trex is widely considered to be one of the inventors of composite decking made from recyclable materials. The idea for a process and product created to maximize the use of materials that would otherwise wind up in landfills is credited to inventors Kjell-Ake Gustafsson, of Binghamton, New York; John J. Muller, of Winchester, Virginia; and Roger A. Wittenberg of Newton, Pennsylvania. The first patent for a "Method of Producing a Wood-Thermoplastic Composite Material" was filed as U.S. Patent number 5746958 in March 1995 and granted in May 1998.

=== 1992 ===
- Wittenberg’s technology is acquired by Mobil Chemical Company for $10 million to create Mobil’s Composite Products Division with Wittenberg at the helm.
- Rivenite is renamed Timbrex.

=== 1994 ===
- Timbrex is renamed Trex.

=== 1996 ===
- Four Mobil executives, including Wittenberg, complete a leveraged buyout of the decking assets to form Trex Company, LLC.

=== 1999 ===
- Trex Company acquires Trex Company, LLC on April 7 and one week later completes its IPO trading under the symbol TWP on the New York Stock Exchange (NYSE).

=== 2004 ===
- Trex forges an unprecedented agreement to sell products through The Home Depot.

=== 2009 ===
- Trex joins the U.S. Green Building Council.

=== 2012 ===
- Trex begins shipping products internationally to distributors across Europe, Australia, Asia and the Middle East.

=== 2015 ===
- Trex begins producing recycled polyethylene pellets for the commercial plastics market.

=== 2017 ===
- Trex recycled pellets achieve ICC certification.
- Trex acquires Minneapolis-based SC Company, including Staging Concepts and SC Railing, to form Trex Commercial Products.

=== 2020 ===
- Trex publishes first Sustainability Report.

=== 2021 ===
- Trex revenue exceeds $1 billion.

=== 2022 ===
- Trex sells Trex Commercial Products, Inc., to Minnesota-based Sightline Commercial Solutions, LLC.

== Leadership and employees ==
Bryan H. Fairbanks was named president and CEO of Trex effective April 29, 2020. Former president and CEO (2015–2020), James E. Cline, has assumed the position of chairman of the board and Ronald W. Kaplan is vice chairman effective April 29, 2020.

Trex Company employs more than 1,800 people worldwide. In June 2023, they took occupancy of its new global headquarters in Winchester, Virginia that accommodates approximately 200 employees. The 64,000-square-foot (5,900 m^{2}) office facility features Trex cladding, a large Trex outdoor living space and eco-friendly elements such as electric vehicle charging stations and rooftop solar panels.

== Manufacturing ==
Trex is America's largest manufacturer of composite decking. Its manufacturing process combines recycled plastic film, like grocery bags and dry cleaning wrap, with reclaimed wood, some of which is swept from the floors of furniture factories. To procure the amount of plastic film necessary for production, Trex works with grocery store chains like Albertsons, which has contributed more than 200 million pounds of recycled plastic film to the NexTrex recycling program. Trex uses approximately 300 million pounds of recycled plastic film annually to make its composite decking.

Trex operates three manufacturing facilities in the United States in Winchester, Virginia, Fernley, Nevada, and Little Rock, Arkansas. The Virginia facility opened in 1993, followed by the Nevada plant in 1999. In 2021, Trex announced plans to develop a multi-faceted production site in Little Rock. A topping out ceremony was held in 2024. In March 2025, lines began running at the polyethylene film recycling and pellet processing plant. Decking production is expected to begin in 2027.

== International growth ==
Trex products are sold in 40+ countries outside of the U.S. Key growth markets include Australia, Caribbean, France, Germany, South/Central America and the United Kingdom. In 2019, the company made significant capital allocations to existing facility in order to meet growing domestic and global demand and leads the industry on a global scale.

=== Notable international projects ===
- Australia: Curtin University, Perth
- Australia: Convoy Lookout at the National Anzac Centre, Albany
- Australia: Monkey Mia boardwalk along the West Australian coastline
- Cayman Islands: The Ritz Carlton, Grand Cayman
- Costa Rica: Avenida Excazu office and mall development
- Germany: Lisa Blumen & Pflanzen Mainau garden
- United Arab Emirates: Dubai JW Marriott Marquis
- United Arab Emirates: Jumeirah Corniche (boardwalk) in Dubai
- United Kingdom: BBC Gardener's World offices

== Products ==
The company offers five tiers of composite decking products and provides a variety of residential railing profiles, colors, and materials. Through licensing agreements, Trex-branded complementary items are available for purchase.

== Environmental considerations ==
Trex promotes an environmental stance as part of its commercial appeal in the marketplace.

=== Recycled components ===
Trex composite decking contains up to 95% recycled and reclaimed content and offers verification by ICC-ES. In July 2010 Trex received a Verification of Attributes Report (VAR-1011) from the International Code Council Evaluation Service under the Sustainable Attributes Verification and Evaluation Program. The verification validates that Trex's wood-alternative decking products are manufactured with a minimum of 95.4% recycled content. Trex claims it is the first composite decking manufacturer to obtain this certification. VAR-1011 was renewed and reissued by ICC-ES in June 2025.

=== Recycled initiatives ===
In 2024, Trex launched the NexTrex Plastic Recycling Drop-Off Directory, an online searchable platform dedicated to connecting eco-minded Americans with local recycling partners. The directory includes approximately 10,000 drop-off locations across all 50 states.

=== Environmental recognition ===
- Barron's 100 Most Sustainable U.S. Companies 2025, Barron's.
- Winner, "Green Products: Decking," 2024, Green Builder Magazine.
- Eco Leader Award, 2019, Green Builder Magazine.
- Readers' Choice Award, 2015 & 2016, Green Builder Magazine.
- Winner, 2016 GAIA award.

== Industry recognition ==
- Best of Houzz Design Award, 2024, Houzz.
- America's Most Responsible Companies 2024, Newsweek.
- IBD's 100 Best ESG Companies for 2023, Investor's Business Daily.
- America's Most Trusted Outdoor Decking 2023, Lifestory Research.
- America's Best Mid-Sized Companies, 2021, Forbes.
- Top Brand, 2017 & 2019 Builder Brand Use Study.
- Top Brand: all four composite/PVC subcategories, 2016, Builder Brand Use Study.
- Gold Award, Social Media Communications, 2016, Publicity Club of Chicago.
- Platinum (×3), Gold (×3) Awards for Design Excellence, 2015, ADEX.
- Best Decking (Platinum List), 2015, Ocean Home Magazine.
- Eight awards, 2015, Remodeling Magazine's Brand Use Study.

== Product issues ==
A manufacturing problem at the Trex manufacturing facility in Fernley, Nevada, from 2002 to 2007 led to production of decking boards that were prone to surface flaking. These boards were sold throughout 16 Western states in the U.S. and resulted in a class-action suit against the company. In a settlement approved in 2010, Trex agreed to replace any decking boards, including some resulting labor costs, for decking affected by surface flaking.
