= Deck railing =

Guard rail on ledges

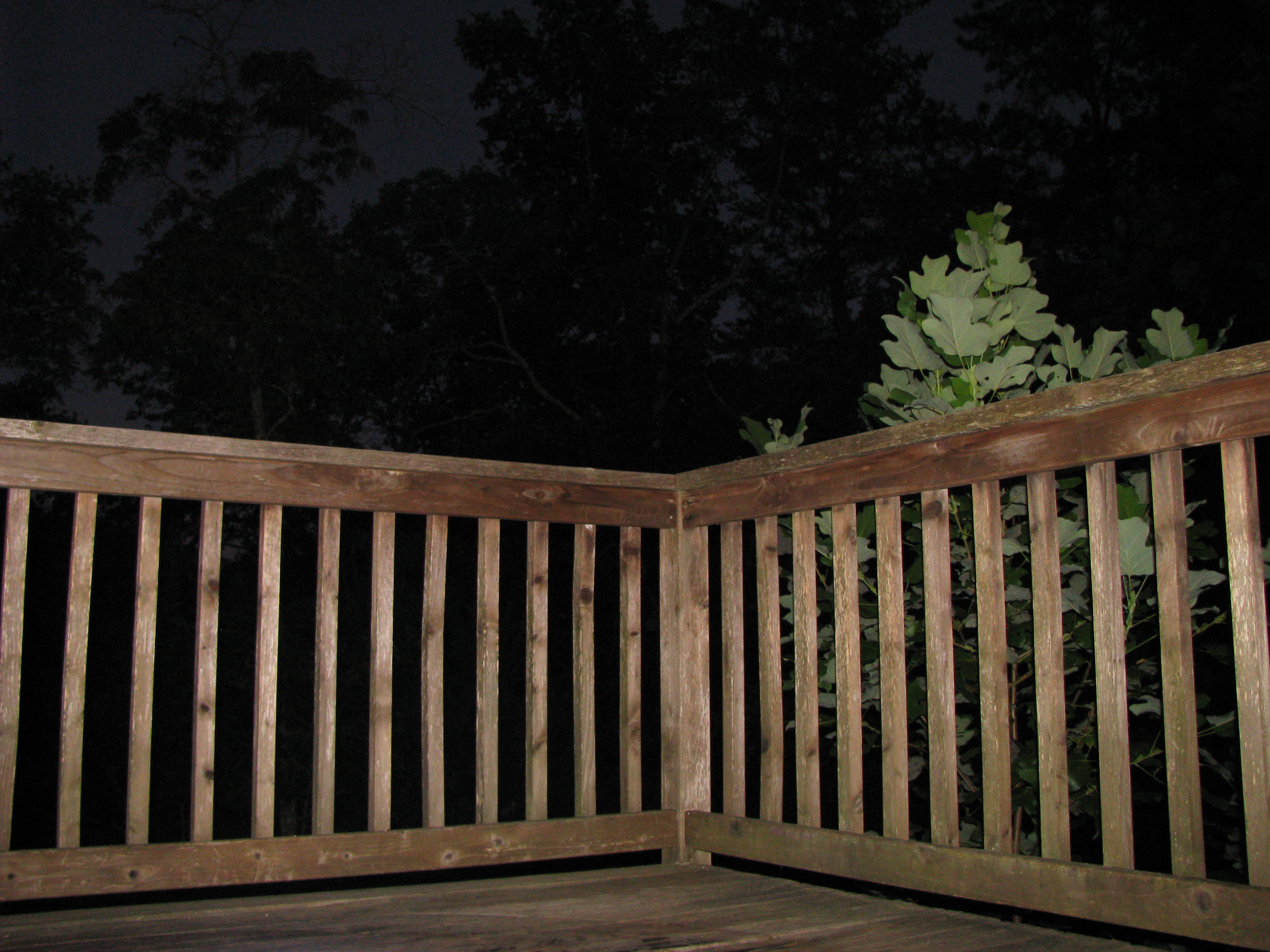
Pressure-treated wood deck railing

Deck railing is a guard rail to prevent people falling from decks, stairs and balconies of buildings. Over time, many different styles of deck railing have been developed.

== Deck railing designs ==
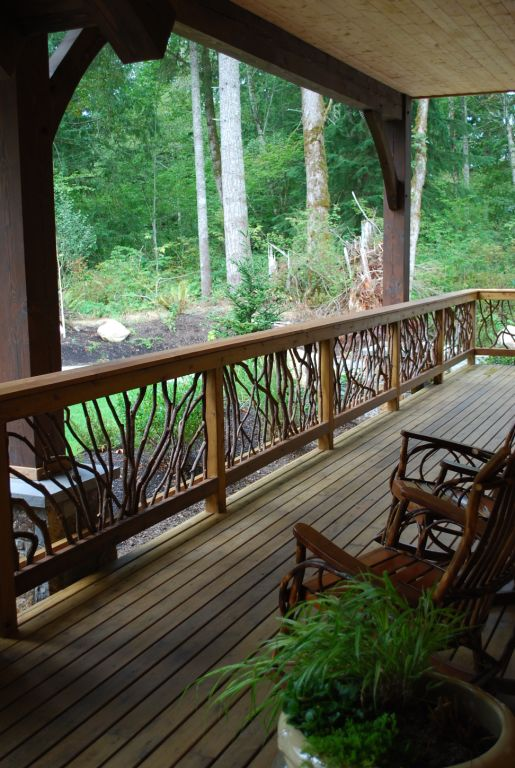
Mountain laurel railings on a timber frame porch

The most common residential deck railing design is built on site using pressure-treated lumber, with the vertical balusters regularly spaced to meet building code. Wood railing could be in different styles such as Victorian, Chippendale and others. A popular alternative to wood railing is composite lumber and PVC railing.

Cable railings typically use stainless steel cables strung horizontally. Stainless-steel cable and fasteners are strong and do not obscure the view. Contemporary frame systems use plastic-coated steel cables.

Glass balusters and glass panels are often used for contemporary architectural projects where unobstructed view is important. All-glass railing without a top rail can be used to maximize the effect. There are, however, cleaning, security, and wildlife protection issues.

Other options include wrought iron and sheet steel, into which custom designs can be cut. Ornamental cast-iron railing was popular in the latter half of the 19th century and it is often associated with the Victorian style and with the traditional architecture of American coastal southern cities like Savannah and New Orleans.

== Deck railing and building code ==
Building code varies on the national, state, county and municipal level. Most areas in the world that use a variation of the International Building Code require a guard rail if there is a difference of 30" or more between platforms. Other common requirements are that no space on the railing be greater than that through which a 4" sphere could pass and that the railing assembly be able to withstand a load of 50 pounds per square foot.

== Deck railing construction ==
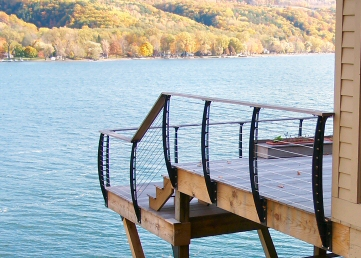
Cable railing on residential deck overlooking a lake

The typical deck railing is generally built from pressure-treated lumber. Posts on a deck are also typically pressure-treated wood and standard sizes are 4x4, 6x6, and 8x8. These posts give structural support to the railing assembly and are the most critical part for the safety of the guard rail assembly. In between the posts, two 2x4s are attached to the posts with screws for the best connection. The lower board is placed 3.5" from the top of the finish deck to the bottom of the board. The top board is placed with the top at 35" from the deck. Then the vertical 2x2 pressure-treated wood balusters are installed spaced regularly every 3.5". Then a 2x6 is installed horizontally across the top of the posts and to 2x4. The 2x6 should be fastened with screws to the posts and 2x4 boards for the most rigidity.

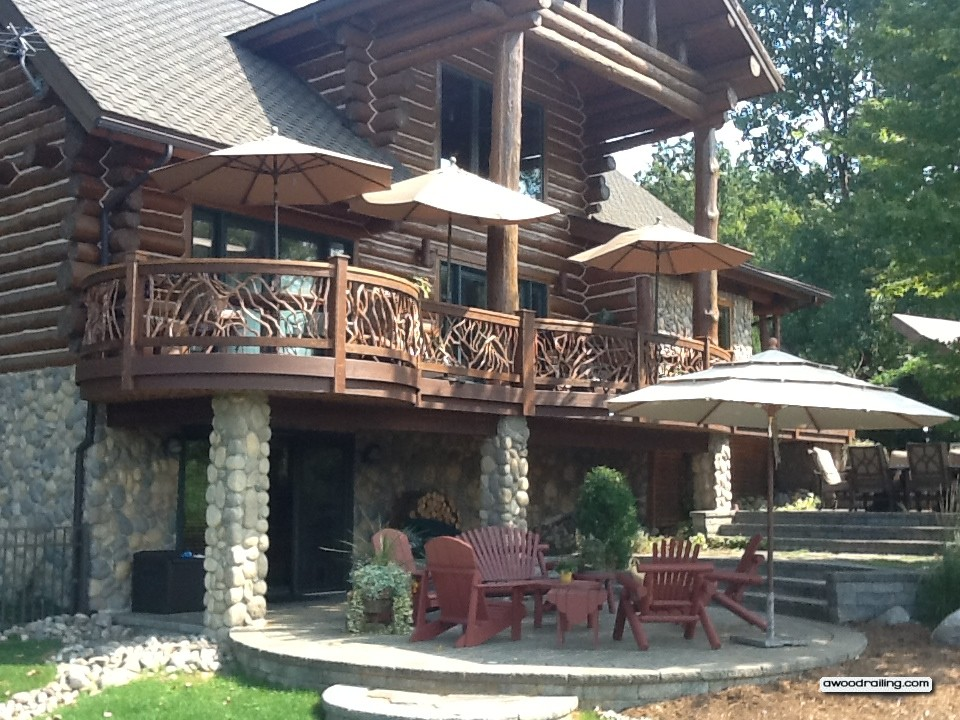
Mountain laurel railings are curved to match a circular deck on a log house.

Mountain laurel handrails, glass baluster systems, metal baluster systems, and composite railing systems are all installed in a similar manner. The differences are in the type of baluster installed. All four of these deck railings can be built using pressure-treated lumber, another wood like cedar, or composite lumber to provide the structure.

Wrought iron and other metal railing systems that do not come in ready-to-install kits will usually require a skilled blacksmith, as much welding will be required. These sections are typically built off-site in a workshop under controlled conditions, so that installation on the job site can be as speedy as possible.

== Materials ==
- Aluminium
- Wood
- Wood-plastic composite
- Vinyl
- Glass (panels)
- Galvanized steel
- Wrought iron
- Cable railings
- Metal

== See also ==
- Dimensional lumber
