= Hand rail (disambiguation) =

A hand rail may refer to:

- A banister on a stairway
- A handrail on a stairway
- A guard rail for safety or security
