= Airbike =

Airbike may refer to

- EADS Airbike, nylon bicycle
- ISON Airbike, ultralight aircraft
- Volonaut Airbike, a compact sized and light weighted (30 kg) manned propulsion aircraft with redundant jet turbines by Volonaut Inc. Developed by Polish inventor and entrepreneur Tomasz Patan.
