= Grigoriou Lampraki 4-6 =

Residential building in Greece

Tower in Glyfada
- Interactive map of the Tower in Glyfada area

General information
- Status: Completed
- Type: Residential
- Location: Glyfada, Greece
- Coordinates: 37.860867°N 23.751477°E

Height
- Height: 44.88 m (147 ft)

Technical details
- Floor count: 12

The building located at Grigoriou Lampraki 4–6, Glyfada (also called Tower in Glyfada) is an approximately 44,9 m (~147,3 ft) residential building in Glyfada. It consists of 12 floors. It is the 46th tallest building in Athens.

== Description ==
The building was built using concrete in a modernist architectural style. There are balconies on each floor in the front and back side of the building. The balconies are white with, in some places, glass panels and in others concrete as deck railing.
