= Plastic bicycle =

Bicycle constructed from plastic or a plastic composite

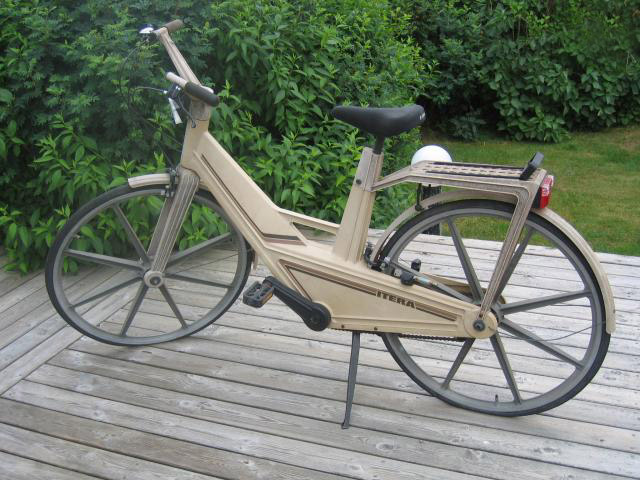
The Itera plastic bicycle.

A plastic bicycle is a bicycle constructed from plastic or a plastic composite material, rather than from metal.

In the 1970s and early 1980s, experimental plastic bicycles were developed and the Itera was produced in significant numbers, but they failed commercially. In the 21st century, developments in the technology have made reinforced plastic composites, especially carbon fibre, widely used for high-end racing bicycles.

== History ==
=== Early moulded bicycles ===
Popular Science featured ads in 1973 from "The Original Plastic Bike Inc", with plans to make the bicycle - including the chain and hubs, possibly excluding the spokes - entirely from injection-molded Lexan. The company was founded on December 15, 1971 by John P. Marzullo, Roger Stark, and William Thompson, based on ideas by Joseph Dorrity and Charles Cadorette. It is unknown whether the company sold a single bicycle, but some prototypes were made. The claim was that it would weigh less than 17 pounds, but would be stronger than steel.

=== Itera ===
In December 1977, Volvo in Gothenburg wanted to produce minicars and investigated conditions and designs. In January 1978, it proposed plastic composite materials in many parts of the car. Other products were considered, the bicycle one of them.

In October 1978, a grant of SEK 54,000 from the Swedish National Board for Technical Development financed a prototype plastic bicycle. In February 1980, a rideable bicycle was demonstrated to the state-owned bank and a loan of SEK 6 million granted. In March 1980, Itera Development Center AB was born to design, produce and market the Swedish Itera Plastic Bicycle, made from injection moulded plastic composite materials. But production ended in technical and commercial failure after three years.

In September 1981, the first Itera bicycles were shown to retailers and the press. Nationwide advertising was scheduled for spring 1982. The bikes were delivered unassembled with tools provided in the box. In autumn 1981, more than 100,000 Swedes indicated they were interested. In February 1982, production started in Vilhelmina. Sales were slow and the news media lost interest. The fact that not every box contained every part to assemble a bicycle frustrated many customers.

The following year was worse. Boxes of bicycles piled up in shops. Among them were returns, mostly with broken parts. Where metal bends, plastic breaks. Getting replacements was not simple as the parts were incompatible with other bikes. Attempts to save the project were unsuccessful.

In 1983, 1,000 Itera bicycles were purchased for a national five-day orienteering contest. They were rented to participants who were invited to buy them after the contest. All were sold. It showed there was a market but it was too late. Campaigns such as lower prices failed. Production ended in 1985. Approximately 30,000 Itera bicycles were produced. The stock was sold to the Caribbean region where they became popular as rust is a problem with metal bicycles.

=== Injection Moulded plastic bikes ===
The FRII Injection molding recycled plastic bicycles is a rather new design, from 2011. It is to be made entirely from injection-molded recycled plastic. The chair set can be pulled out and replaced to adjust to the height of the rider. It is to be produced by local industries for economy and ecological reasons, as its manufacture process is simple and low cost in large quantities. Designer: Dror Peleg, a graduate of Bezalel Academy of Art and Design in Jerusalem.

=== 3D printed bicycles ===
The EADS Airbike is a bicycle constructed from laser-formed nylon powder. Made in 2011, it was the first 3D printed bicycle.

== Fibre Reinforced Plastic Bicycles ==
In the 21st century, with advances in carbon and kevlar fibre reinforced plastic composites, the challenges around making successful plastic bicycles were met, and it is now they are materials of choice for high-end bicycle frames and wheels, especially for racing bicycles.

== See also ==
- Plastic composite (disambiguation)
