= Cable railing =

Safety rails

Cable railings, or wire rope railings, are safety rails that use horizontal or vertical cables in place of spindles, rods, glass, or mesh for infill.

Cable railings are one of several infill options used in guard systems; other common alternatives include glass panels, metal balusters, and mesh systems depending on design, visibility requirements, and code considerations.

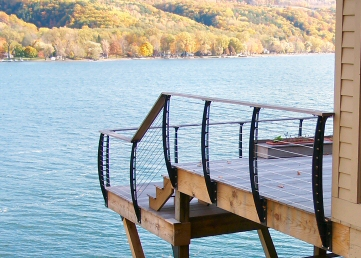
Cable railing on residential deck overlooking a lake

== Uses ==
Cable railings are often desired in place of traditional pickets to achieve nearly unobstructed views as the cable is much thinner than traditional pickets. It is also a more modern aesthetic and is often chosen for that reason.

Cable assemblies can be installed into an existing railing system (called cable infill) for easier maintenance.

== Post construction ==
Due to the excessive load requirements of this type of railing system, post construction is critical to the success of cable railings.

Cable railing requires very rigid frames compared to many other types of railings due to the forces applied to the end posts by tensioning the cables. Cables must be tensioned to provide minimum cable deflection using a 4-inch sphere, to satisfy building code requirements. Manufacturers use different methods to achieve the same result; one manufacturer uses a thicker wall and a webbed post in their aluminum systems, while using only thicker side walls in their stainless steel systems. Common frame types are constructed of steel, stainless steel, extruded aluminum or wood.

== Post height ==
The total minimum height required varies per building codes depending on the area and target use of either residential or commercial. Local city codes supersede state, national and international code. In most U.S. states, the residential code is 36 inches high. There are some exceptions; for example, in California the required height for residential railing is 42 inches. On the other hand, the commercial International Building Code requires the railing to be at a minimum height of 42 inches. Posts can be floor-mounted or fascia/side-mounted, but the height of the railing is measured from the floor to the top of the railing.

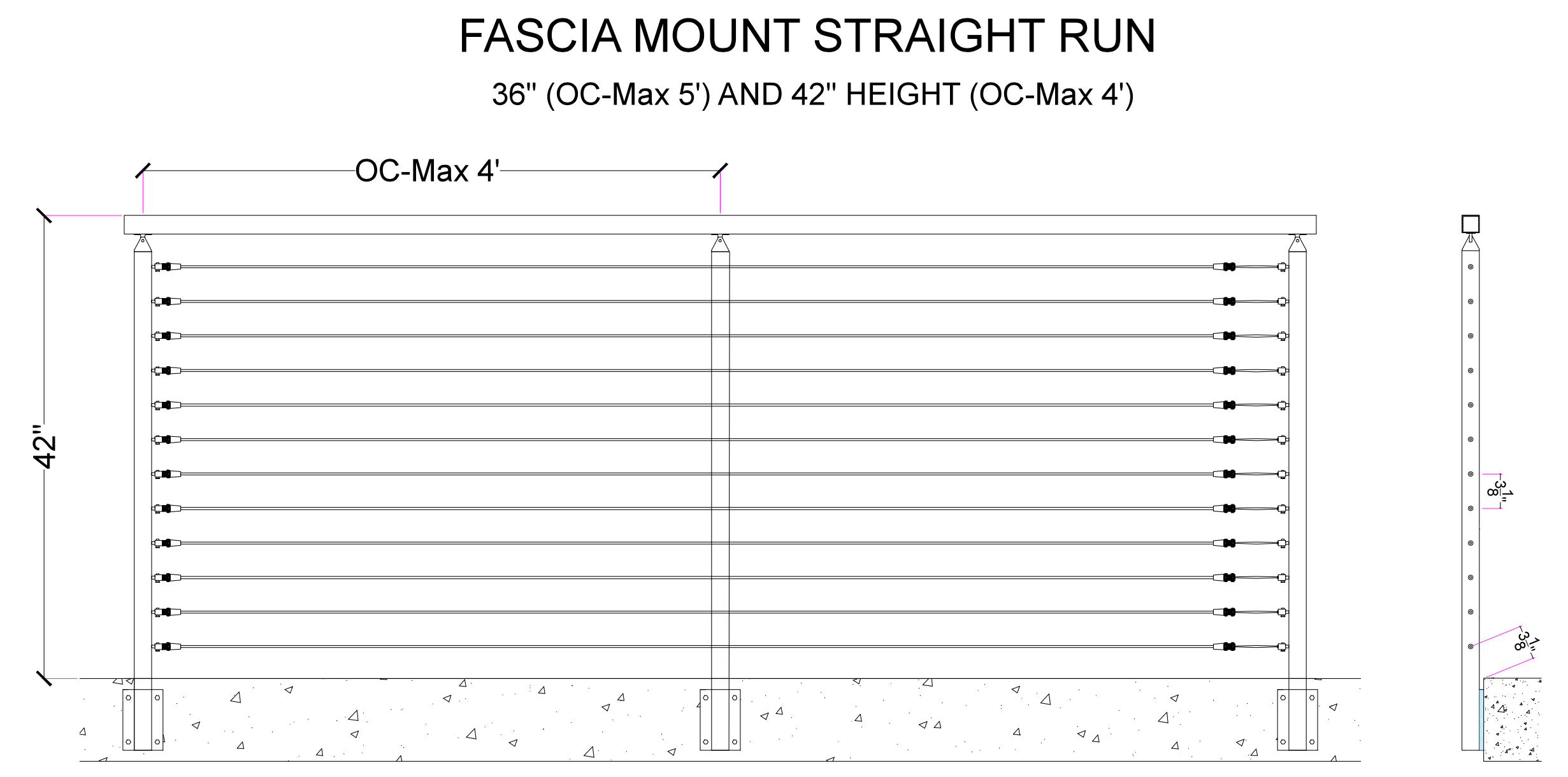
Fascia-mounted cable railings at 42-inch height

== Spacing between cables ==
Guidelines for spacing between cable components are simple. According to international building codes ICC, openings between cables should not exceed 4". Moreover, a 4" sphere should not be able to pass through the openings. Spacing between posts should be kept consistent (when possible) along the assembly. For 36” posts or 42" posts, 4 feet of spacing (center to center) is recommended to minimize deflection between the cables when pushing a 4" ball between two cables. To accommodate such standards, railing projects may incorporate 3 ½" or less of spacing between cables, taking into account the cable deflection caused by the posts spacing. This configuration would streamline compliance with the 4" sphere requirement.

== Cables and tensioning ==
Cable is very strong in tensile strength, with a breaking strength in excess of 1000 lbs for these types of uses, and is a suitable in-fill material for a railing ("guard" in ICC codes). Typical diameters are 1/8", 3/16" for residential and 3/16" and 1/4" for commercial applications. There are many different types cable and strand (also referred to as wire rope). Cable and strand is available in galvanized carbon steel, type 304 stainless steel, or the highly corrosion resistant, type 316 stainless steel (best for coastal areas). The most common cable construction is 1x19 type construction strand, which is 19 cables twisted in a single bundle, whereas for example, 7x7 would be 7 cable bundles of 7 cables twisted. This type of stainless strand is designed to have limited stretch, as compared to galvanized, making it a good long term cable railing solution. It has long been used for yacht stays and guy wires, proving its outdoor durability and strength.

== Cable flexibility ==
Cable flexibility is an important consideration in designing a cable railing. The old UBC (Uniform Building Code) and newer ICC (IBC and IRC) codes state that a 4” sphere shall not pass through any portion of a barrier on a guardrail. In a horizontal or vertical cable rail, the cables, once tensioned must be rigid enough to prevent a 4-inch sphere passing through it. Factors influencing this rigidity are: the tension of the cable, intermediate posts (or cable spacers) spacing, the diameter of the cable, top rail cap material and the cable to cable spacing. The application of the 4" sphere test is usually at the discretion of a code enforcement official who will interpret the force behind the 4" sphere so it is advised that cable spacing not be more than 3" over a 48" space between post.

Cable tension: An incredible amount of tension is generated on the end posts when ten or more cables, each tensioned at 200-400 lbs. over a height of 36" to 42” exists. Underestimating the tension of cables applied to end poles can cause a safety hazard. Cable can have too much deflection allowing body parts to slip through, or cables can merely "pull out" of the end fittings, causing the cable rail to fail. Poorly designed end posts will result in a railing where the cables cannot be properly tensioned without an unacceptable amount of cable deflection. End posts to which the tensioning hardware attaches must be constructed so that they will not deflect perceptibly.

Post spacing: Intermediate posts are posts which provide mounting for the top rail and have a vertical row of holes to support the cable as it passes through them. Since the post to post spacing is a primary driver of cable rigidity, the post to post spacing is very important. It is generally recommended that post spacing be no more than 5 ft on center Some manufacturers require as little as no more than 3 ft on center. The reason for post spacing is more about the cable end fittings' machine thread loading capacity (how much tension can be put on the threads before they fail), than anything else. The more cable drop in the middle, the more weight on the tensioning device, ergo the more load on the threads. Proof strength must be greater than load.

Cable diameter and properties: The next variable is the diameter of the cable. Cables can be any wire rope, which meets load strength requirements by the ICC. The most available types are 1x19 1/8", 1 x 19 5/32", 1x19 3/16", 7x7 3/16" and 1x19 1/4". 1 x 19 cable is the most rigid cable available and per the first paragraph above will have greater resistance to the 4" sphere test and likewise have a lesser chance of allowing objects 4" and over to slip through the cable. 316 Stainless Steel is preferred, due to its inherent nature against stretching, keeping long term maintenance down, as well as having anti-corrosive properties.

Top rail: Top rail material must be strong as it is being compressed by the combined cable forces. Common top cap materials are the stronger species of wood or metal. Composite lumber can be used if a support rail is used along with it. The support rail is used between the posts to lend strength to the system, both between the posts, and to the Top Rail.

Cable to cable spacing: Spacing of the cables vertically is critical to minimize deflection of the cables. Most manufacturers recommended maximum vertical spacing of no more than 3-inch free opening between cables when they are installed to meet cable deflection requirements as stated above.

All of the above factors work together to minimize the deflection of the cable to prevent a 4” sphere from passing between the cables when they are properly tensioned in a well-designed frame. This is a requirement according to a number of building codes. Among the more stringent, including that of California, this requirement may be used in conjunction with a weight being hung from the cable.

== Cable end fittings ==
Cable end fittings are the pieces that tie the system together. The cable attaches into one side of the fitting, while the other side attaches to the post (frame structure). Cable ends may tension, or just attach to the frame, depending on the individual needs of the project. The requirements needed to decide whether to use tensioning or non-tensioning fittings are generally dependent upon the manufacturer's system requirements, your local building codes, and ICC requirements. To determine the type of cable end fittings needed, you'll need to know the distance you expect a single piece of cable to run without stopping, and the amount of tensioning ability of the fitting you expect to use. Individual manufacturers will help you to determine the rest. Most cable end fittings are made by type 316 stainless steel to avoid rust.

== See also ==
- Handrail
- Guard rail
- Baluster
