= Plastic composite =

Plastic composite may refer to:

- Wood-plastic composite
- Composite lumber

== See also ==
- Composite armour
- Composite material
- Fiber-reinforced composite
- Plastic recycling
