= Deck (building) =

Flat outdoor surface connected to a building

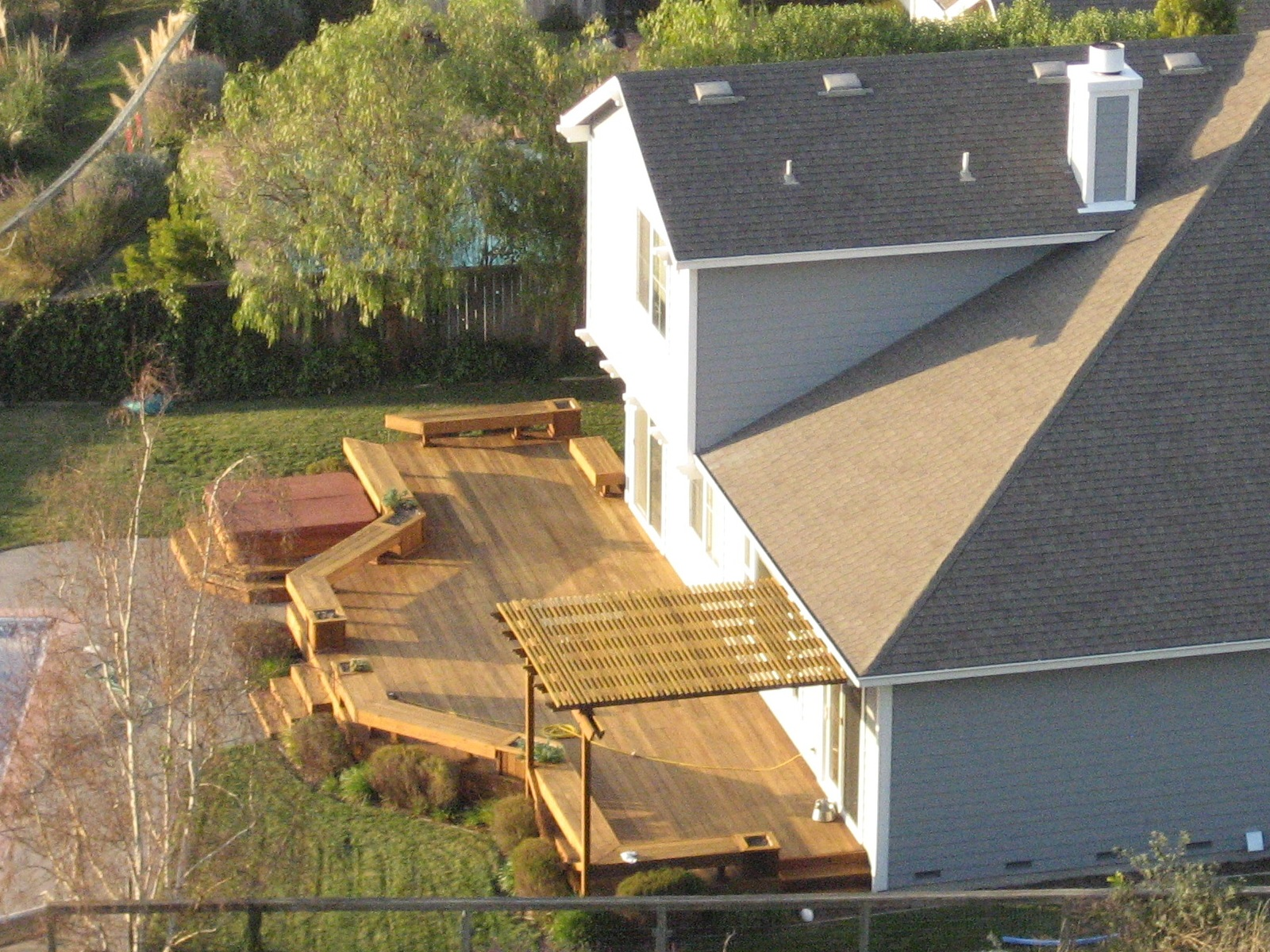
A deck in the backyard of a suburban house

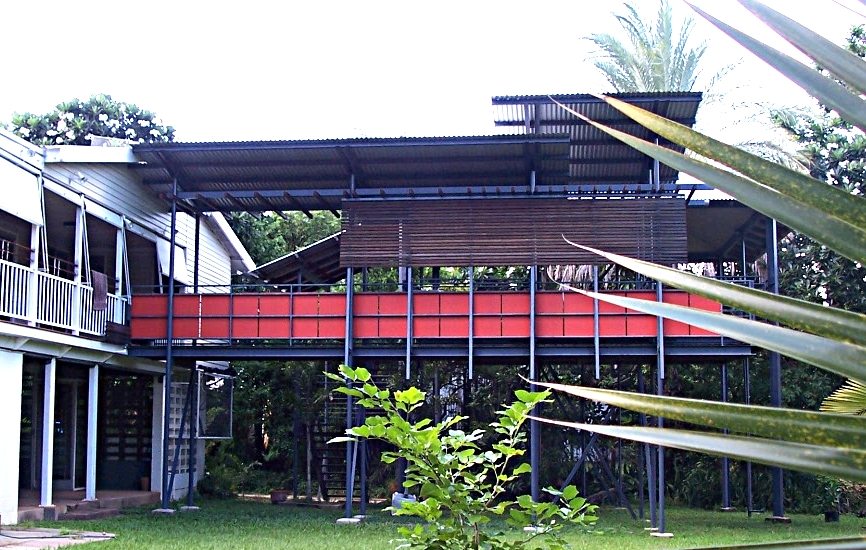
A high level corridor deck in the backyard of a suburban house in Australia

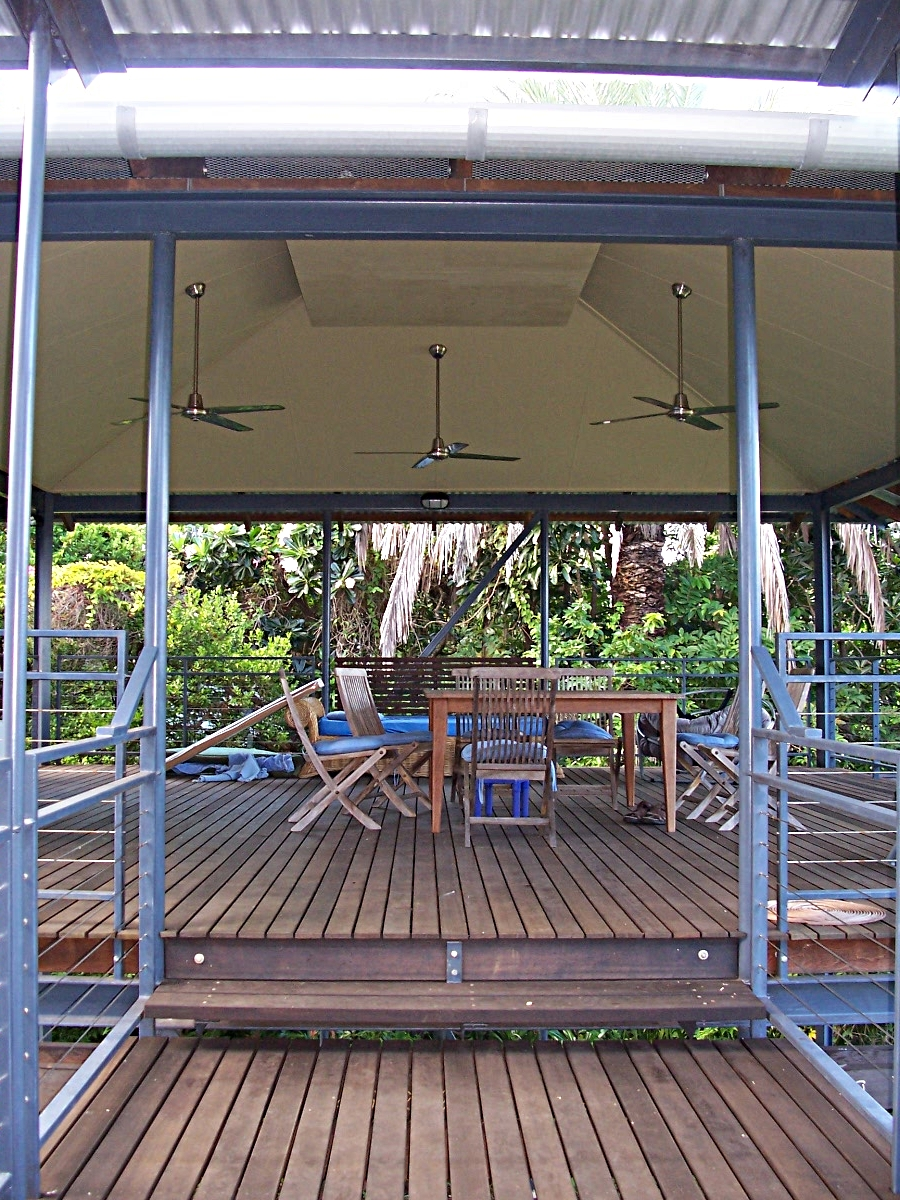
A high level deck in the backyard of a suburban house in Australia. The decking is selangan batu, a Malaysian timber.

In architecture, a deck is a flat surface capable of supporting weight, similar to a floor, but typically constructed outdoors, often elevated from the ground, and usually connected to a building. The term is a generalization from the deck of a ship. A level architectural deck may be intended for use by people, e.g., what in the UK is usually called a decked patio. "Roof deck" refers to the flat layer of construction materials to which the weather impervious layers are attached to form a roof, and they may be either level (for a "flat" rooftop) or sloped.

== Functions and materials ==
Wood or timber decking can be used in a number of ways: as part of garden landscaping, to extend the living area of a house, and as an alternative to stone-based features such as patios. Decks are made from treated lumber, composite lumber, composite material, and aluminum. Lumber may be western red cedar, teak, mahogany, ipê, reclaimed and recycled ulin and other hardwoods. Recycled planks may be high-density polyethylene (HDPE), polystyrene (PS) and PET plastic as well as mixed plastics and wood fiber (often called "composite" lumber). Artificial decking products are often called "wood-plastic composites" (WPC). WPCs have different brands like NewTechWood, Azek, Ecornboard etc.

Historically, the softwoods used for decking were logged from old growth forests. These include Atlantic white cedar, redwood, and western red cedar (redcedar). Atlantic City built the first coastal boardwalk in the United States, originally constructed of the Atlantic white cedar. Soon, the commercial logging of this tree and clearing of cedar swamps in New Jersey caused a decline in the availability of decking. Atlantic City and New York City both switched to Western red cedar. By the 1960s, western red cedar from the US was declining due to over-logging. More expensive western red cedar was available from western Canada (British Columbia) but by then, pressure-treated pine had become available.

But even with chemical treatments (such as chromated copper arsenate or CCA), pine decking is not as durable as cedars in an outdoor environment. Thus, many municipalities and homeowners are turning to hardwoods. Decks are often built from pressure-treated wood. Pressure-treated wood is long lasting and holds up to wet and icy conditions. Pressure-treating chemicals are known to be toxic. Both softwood and hardwood decks need to be finished after installation using either an oil or varnish to prevent weathering, wear, mold, algae and wood-boring insects.

Due to environmental and durability concerns, composite decking (a mixture of two materials, typically wood pulp and recycled material such as plastic bottles or plastic bags) have appeared on the market. Proponents of composite decking tout it as a much-needed development, as it helps to curb logging of trees for new decks. However, composite decking contains harmful chemicals, cannot be refurbished, and despite claims from decking companies, some composite decking still attracts mold. However, newer more modern composites feature a cap or shell that prevents mold and staining. In multi-story commercial construction, the dominant form of deck (including roof deck) construction is composite steel deck.

Generally, hardwoods used for decking come from tropical forests. Much of the logging of these woods, especially teak, mahogany and ipê, is illegal, as outlined in numerous reports by environmental organizations such as Greenpeace, Friends of the Earth and Rainforest Relief. US tropical wood imports are rising, partly due to the demand for decking.

== Construction ==
The deck of a house is generally a wooden platform built above the ground and connected to the main building. It is generally enclosed by a railing for safety. Access may be from the house through doors and from the ground via a stairway. Residential decks can be constructed over steep areas or rough ground that is otherwise unusable. Decks can also be covered by a canopy or pergola to control sunlight. Deck designs can be found in numerous books, do-it-yourself magazines, and websites, and from the USDA.

Typical construction is either of a post and beam architecture, or a cantilever construction. The post-and-beam construction relies on posts anchored to piers in the ground. Typically, these types of structural decks are engineered and require an experienced construction company that specializes in structural decks. Cantilever decks rely on floor joists that protrude out further than the wall of the house. While this type of construction is common, it raises significant safety issues if the decks are not properly waterproofed and flashed. There have been a growing number of deck failures resulting in death and critical injuries. Another key component of decks are code compliant railings. Railings on decks above 760 mm (30 in) are considered guard rails. Guard rails have a specific building code requirement for both height and structural strength. Most US commercial building codes require a 1,100 mm (42 in) guardrail on decks, and 910 or 1,070 mm (36 or 42 in) for a residential code depending on the state. Typical railing assemblies must meet structural strength requirements of 9.6 kPa (200 lbf/ft^{2}). In short, decks are complex load-bearing structures that most often require structural engineering, plans, and permits. In modern residential architecture, decks are increasingly integrated into comprehensive outdoor living areas. Often combined with adjacent patios, covered structures, and outdoor kitchens, these integrated zones effectively extend the functional living space of a home and are noted for potentially enhancing overall property resale value.

Residential decks may contain spaces for cooking and seating. Cooking areas ideally should be situated near the patio door while out of the way from general foot traffic. Dining spaces will include patio tables. For a typical six-person outdoor patio table building, an area of 3.7 m × 4.9 m (12 ft × 16 ft) is ideal. If deck space is available, homeowners may choose to include for the seating, outdoor couches and benches.

Larger buildings may also have decks on the upper floors of the building which can be open to the public as observation decks or greeneries. A deck is also the surface used to construct a boardwalk over sand on barrier islands.

Laying deck or throwing deck refers to the act of placing and bolting down cold-formed steel beneath roofing and concrete floors. This is usually done by an ironworker, sometimes in conjunction with a cement mason or carpenter. It regarded as one of the most physically demanding jobs in the iron working industry.

In the United Kingdom the various bans on smoking in public buildings were expected to lead to an increase in the use of timber decking for outdoor spaces where smokers can gather.

== See also ==
- Balcony
- Deck (bridge)
- Porch
- Terrace (building)
- Veranda
