= Composite lumber =

Wood-plastic composite building material

Composite lumber is a material that is a mixture of wood fiber, plastic, and some type of binding agent. These ingredients are put together to form a material that is denser, stronger, and heavier than wood alone, a wood-plastic composite.

== History ==
Until the 1990s, wood was the material of choice for deck construction. However, new products, composites, began to emerge at this time. These new products offered the look and workability of wood, but they were more water resistant and required less maintenance. Over time, these lower maintenance decking options increased in popularity. Although the majority of decks are still built of pressure treated pine, redwood, cedar or mahogany, use of composite woods has increased as outdoor decks and living areas have become popular as home features.

== Features ==
Working with composite lumber is similar to working with wood. However, composite lumber has the added benefit of being less likely to split or delaminate. Some composite lumber is also engineered to be lighter weight for easier handling. Composite lumber is also more stain, scratch, and mold resistant, and is therefore supposed to have a longer life than wood lumber.

== Advantages ==
Composite lumber comes from the manufacturer as a finished product. There is no need to stain, sand, or paint the material. Composite materials usually cost more than lumber, but their long life and low-maintenance requirements could make them more economical in the long run. Most composites also come with a warranty ranging from several years to the lifetime of the deck. The warranties cover the fade resistance, structural integrity and stain resistance. Many composites are often made partially out of recycled plastics and waste wood, which makes them an environmentally friendly, efficient use of resources.

== Disadvantages ==
Composite lumber is usually more costly than normal or treated lumber, but prices have come down over the years. Composites may last longer, but the initial investment is likely to be higher. Many composites are formulated to be fade, scratch, and stain resistant, but no lumber is immune to the elements. Although composite lumber may resist these marring effects better than other materials, it will still show signs of wear over time. Composite lumber often has a plastic-like or synthetic appearance. Although manufacturers do mold the product with a wood grain or brush stroke pattern, some consumers simply do not like the artificial sheen.

=== Environmental impact ===
The growth of wood-alternative products continues to fuel a debate about their environmental value when compared to wood, treated wood, metal and other alternatives. Many suggest that wood decking is made from a more sustainable ingredient and that it carries a smaller manufacturing carbon footprint. Others have claimed that the sawing of wood-alternative products during construction creates dust that will not biodegrade and that the wood-alternative deck boards, when they have outlived their useful lives, will not biodegrade in landfills. Even though some manufacturers claim they can purchase back this material and re-introduce it to the production of new composite product.

== Capped composite decking ==
Capped composite decking is composite decking, with a thin, approximately 1/16 inch (1.6 mm), PVC-like veneer, or cap. This cap provides protection for the composite underneath. The cap is also formulated differently, in order to provide increased fade, stain, and scratch resistance. Capped composite decking is more expensive than both normal composite decking and wood decking because of the more involved manufacturing process in adding the second, co-extruded layer to the board. Capped composites also lack the feel of real wood. Although manufacturers form the product with a realistic wood grain or brush stroke, some contractors and deck owners will not accept the artificial sheen. Capped composites, although formulated to resist fading, stains, and scratches, will show some wear over time, even if it is less than a normal composite or real wood product.

Composite deck boards are sold in either grooved or solid sided versions. The grooved composite board is fastened with hidden deck fasteners or clips, while the solid board is typically face-screwed. Most composite deck board manufacturers produce lengths of 12, 16, or 20 feet (3.7, 4.9, or 6.1 m), 5 1/2 by 3/4 inch (140 mm × 19 mm).

Manufacturers of capped composite boards will often leave one side uncapped to prevent the material from expanding and mushrooming out of the corners of the boards. This is usually the bottom side and allows the material within to expand and contract naturally during varying weather conditions, without causing lasting damage. A minority of manufacturers use four-sided capping processes providing a reversible decking board, completely sealed for protection against the elements. Emulated wood grain patterns differ on either side to provide more versatile design options.

== See also ==
- Composite construction
- Glued laminated timber
- Plastic composite (disambiguation)
- Wood–plastic composite

== Additional sources ==
- Verespej, Mike (March 26, 2012). "Composite deck maker Fiberon calls class action claims 'completely false'". Plastics News Magazine.
- https://web.archive.org/web/20120624055442/http://beautiful-backyard-blog.com/category/composite-materials/timbertech/-discusses composite decking
