= IMAC =

iMac is a line of Apple computers.

IMAC or Imac may also refer to:

== People ==
- Necmettin Imac (born 1987), Netherlands footballer
- Nedim Imaç (1966–2007), Turkish-Dutch businessman and sports executive

== Other uses ==
- Immobilized metal ion affinity chromatography (IMAC)
- Independent Monitoring Association for Child Labor (IMAC), under the Atlanta Agreement
- International Miniature Aerobatic Club, a non-profit organization
- I Marine Amphibious Corps (I MAC), a Second World War formation of the United States Marine Corps
