= Necmettin =

Necmettin is the Turkish version of the Arabic name Najm al-Din. Notable people with the name are as follows:

- Necmettin Cevheri (1930–2023), Turkish lawyer and politician
- Necmettin Erbakan (1926–2011), Turkish politician
- Necmettin Imac (born 1987), Dutch footballer
- Necmettin Karaduman (1927–2017), Turkish politician and former parliament speaker
- Necmettin Sadak (1890–1953), Turkish politician
