= F5b =

Type of model aircraft competition

F5b is a type of radio control electric model aircraft contest that consists of doing as many laps as possible between 2 poles 150 meters apart in 200 seconds followed by 10 minutes of thermalling, and then landing on a 30-meter landing circle. The laps must be made while gliding only, no motor allowed, so the motor is used to rapidly climb and power into the course. There is a limit of 10 climbs, so to get more than 20 laps (a complete circuit- to the far pole & back- is 2 laps) the plane must climb high and glide 4 laps. To score more than 40 laps, the plane must glide a combination of 4 laps sets and 6 lap sets.

A typical F5b aircraft is commonly referred to as a hotliner. competition rules are set by the Fédération Aéronautique Internationale (FAI) in Sporting Code Volume F5 Radio Control Electric Powered Model Aircraft, 2013 Edition
