= Octatron SkySeer =

The Octatron SkySeer, also known as The Octatron, is a close-range unmanned aerial vehicle (UAV) designed for easy transport and launch. It is designed and manufactured by Octatron, Incorporated in St. Petersburg, Florida, USA.

Intended for short-range operations, the electric-powered SkySeer resembles a normal radio-controlled airplane or two-meter glider. The SkySeer is hand-launched by its operator and its flight functions can be handled by GPS including landings. The range is approximately two miles/3.2 km and is extendable via Octatron's NetWeaver interface.

A SkySeer includes video surveillance equipment, ground station, and computer interfaces.

The Los Angeles County Sheriff's Department is currently experimenting with the SkySeer as a means of crime prevention. At present, the experiment has been suspended by the Federal Aviation Administration due to the agency's claim of lack of adequate permits. Although the FAA does not regulate model aircraft, it does have jurisdiction over unmanned aerial vehicles.

== Airframe specifications ==
- Wingspan: 6.5' (1.98m)
- Weight: 3.125 lbs (1.42 kg)
- Endurance: 45 to 60 minutes at cruise speed of 23 mph (37 km/h)
