= Najm al-Din =

Najm al-Din (Arabic: نجم الدين, romanized: Najm al-Dīn, lit. 'Star of the Faith'), also transliterated Najm ad-Din, Najmuddin, etc., is a male given name of Arabic origin. It may refer to:

== People ==
- Najm al-Din Ayyub (died 1173), Kurdish soldier, father of Saladin
- Umara al-Yamani (1121–1174), Yemeni poet and historian
- Najm al-Din al-Khabushani (1116–1191), Persian Shafi'i jurist
- Najmuddin Kubra (1145–1221), Persian Sufi philosopher
- Najm al-Din Razi (1177–1256), Persian Sufi philosopher
- Al-Malik as-Salih Najm al-Din Ayyub, or just As-Salih Ayyub (1205–1249), Ayyubid ruler of Egypt
- Najm al-Dīn al-Qazwīnī al-Kātibī (died 1276), Persian Islamic philosopher and logician of the Shafi`i school
- Najm al-Din Mahmud ibn Ilyas al-Shirazi (died 1330), Persian physician
- Najimuddin Ali Khan (1750–1766), Nawab of Bengal
- Najmuddin of Gotzo (1859–1925), North Caucasian religious, military and political anticommunist leader
- Jumeken Najimedenov (1935–1983), Kazakh composer
- Najmuddin Shaikh (1939–2025), Pakistani diplomat
- Najmaldin Karim (1949–2020), Governor of Kirkuk Province
- Najmuddin Faraj Ahmad, known as Mullah Krekar (born 1956), exiled Kurdish politician
- Najmadin Shukr Rauf (1957–1985), Kurdish soldier
- Suzan Najm Aldeen (born 1966), Syrian actress
- Nagmeldin Ali Abubakr (born 1986), Sudanese athlete
- Najm Eldin Abdullah (born 1987), Sudanese footballer
- Najmiddin Jalolov (1972–2009), Uzbek Islamic fighter
- Najmiddin Kosimkhojiev (born 2004), Uzbekistani taekwondo practitioner
- Najmuddin Khan, Pakistani politician

== Places ==
- Mazraeh-ye Khodaqoli Najam ol Din, village in Iran

== See also ==
- Necmettin
