= International Miniature Aerobatic Club =

Non-profit organization devoted to miniature aircraft in Northern America

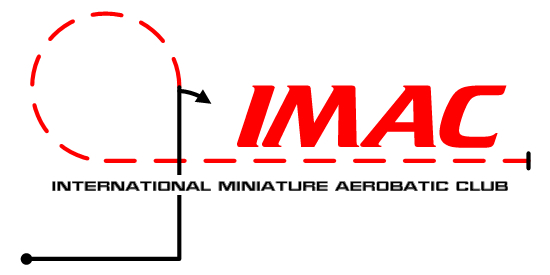
International Miniature Aerobatics Club organization logo.

International Miniature Aerobatic Club (IMAC) is a non-profit organization devoted to flying scale aerobatic model aircraft. IMAC is the main governing body responsible for hosting precision aerobatic contests with hundreds of pilots across the United States and Eastern Canada. The organization was founded in 1974 with 97 chartered members.

For safety reasons, IMAC competitions are hosted only at Academy of Model Aeronautics or Model Aeronautics Association of Canada sanctioned flying clubs.

== Classes ==
Aerobatic model aircraft flying an IMAC sequence.

IMAC contests are segregated into five class levels with an optional sixth class at some events. In addition to known programs, a pilot is given unknown programs the day of the competition that can only be attempted once (except the basic class, which does not fly unknowns). If a contestant wins five contests in a season, they are required to advance to the next higher class at the beginning of the new season.

=== Basic (411) ===
- Open to all pilots with a monoplane or biplane aircraft.
- Aircraft at this level do not require a model pilot or dashboard.

=== Sportsman (412) ===
- Unknown programs are limited to one full roll on any line and one half roll on any 45 degree line.
- Unknown programs cannot contain combination roll elements.

=== Intermediate (415) ===
- Unknown programs cannot exceed 1½ rolls on combination or single roll elements, excluding spins.
- Unknown programs are limited to a single roll with any looping maneuvers.

=== Advanced (413) ===
- Unknown programs cannot exceed 2 rolls on combination or single roll elements, excluding spins.
- Unknown programs are limited to 1½ rolls with any looping maneuvers.

=== Unlimited (414) ===
- Unknown programs cannot exceed 2 rolls on combination or single roll elements, excluding spins.
- Unknown programs are limited to 2½ rolls for downline, and 3 rolls for up line, combination roll elements.

=== Freestyle ===
- Requires pilot to compete in one of the five standard classes to be eligible.
- Separate awards offered from main competition.
- Pilots are judge on a combination of Technical Merit, Artistic Impression, and Positioning.

== Aresti ==
Sequences within each class are described using Aresti notation. This provides a standard method of documenting aerobatic maneuvers permitted within each class level for both pilots and judges. Pilots are judged on the quality and precision of their flying skills.

== Regional contests ==
Each year, an official IMAC committee reviews the flying sequences within each class to makes adjustments as well as to offer new challenges for pilots. Contestant judging is generally used to score participating pilots and assign a ranking within each class. Those achieving the highest scores in their class are rewarded with trophies and peer recognition for their accomplishments. Contest events are regionalized by states and provinces.

=== Northeast ===
- Maine, Vermont, Connecticut, Rhode Island, New York, New Jersey, Pennsylvania, Delaware, Maryland, Quebec

=== Southeast ===
- Virginia, Tennessee, North Carolina, South Carolina, Georgia, Alabama, Florida

=== North central ===
- Minnesota, Iowa, Wisconsin, Illinois, Indiana, Michigan, Ohio, West Virginia, Kentucky, Ontario

=== South central ===
- Kansas, Missouri, Oklahoma, Arkansas, Texas, Louisiana, Mississippi

=== Northwest ===
- Alaska, Washington, Oregon, Montana, Wyoming, North Dakota, South Dakota, Nebraska, Alberta, British Columbia

=== Southwest ===
- California, Nevada, Utah, Colorado, Arizona, New Mexico
