= Model Aeronautics Association of Canada =

- Abbreviation: MAAC
- Formation: 1949
- Headquarters: Burlington, Ontario, Canada
- Website: www.maac.ca

The Model Aeronautics Association of Canada (MAAC) is the official organization for all forms of the aeromodelling hobby, for model aircraft hobbyists living in Canada. Based in Burlington, Ontario, it was founded in 1949, and presently has over 5000 members. MAAC is responsible for instituting official policies and regulations and guidelines. This includes radio frequencies, noise restrictions, and flying clubs. They organize flying events across Canada, and provide liability insurance coverage to its members.

MAAC produces a magazine, Model Aviation Canada, which is included in the yearly membership fees, containing regional reports from elected zone directors, articles and model reviews from around the country.

MAAC offers guidelines for the Wings program, teaching beginners how to safely operate an aircraft.

== See also ==
- Academy of Model Aeronautics, the United States brother organization of aeromodeling
