= Necmettin Imac =

Dutch association football player

Personal information
- Full name: Necmettin Imac
- Date of birth: February 18, 1987 (age 39)
- Place of birth: Amsterdam, Netherlands
- Height: 5 ft 10 in (1.78 m)
- Position: Attacking midfielder

Team information
- Current team: Cambuur Leeuwarden

Youth career
- 2000–2004: AFC Ajax

Senior career*
Years	Team	Apps	(Gls)
2005–2006	FC Groningen	0	
2006–2007	Cambuur Leeuwarden	22	(7)
2007–2008	Cambuur Leeuwarden	19	(5)
- AGB
- * Club domestic league appearances and goals as of April 3, 2008

Necmettin Imac (born February 18, 1987, in Amsterdam) is a midfielder who played for Cambuur Leeuwarden. He is a citizen of The Netherlands. He retired from the team in 2018.

== International ==
Necmettin Imac has played with the U16 Netherlands national football team 9 times, scoring 4 goals.
