= Radio-controlled aircraft =

Aircraft controlled remotely via radio control

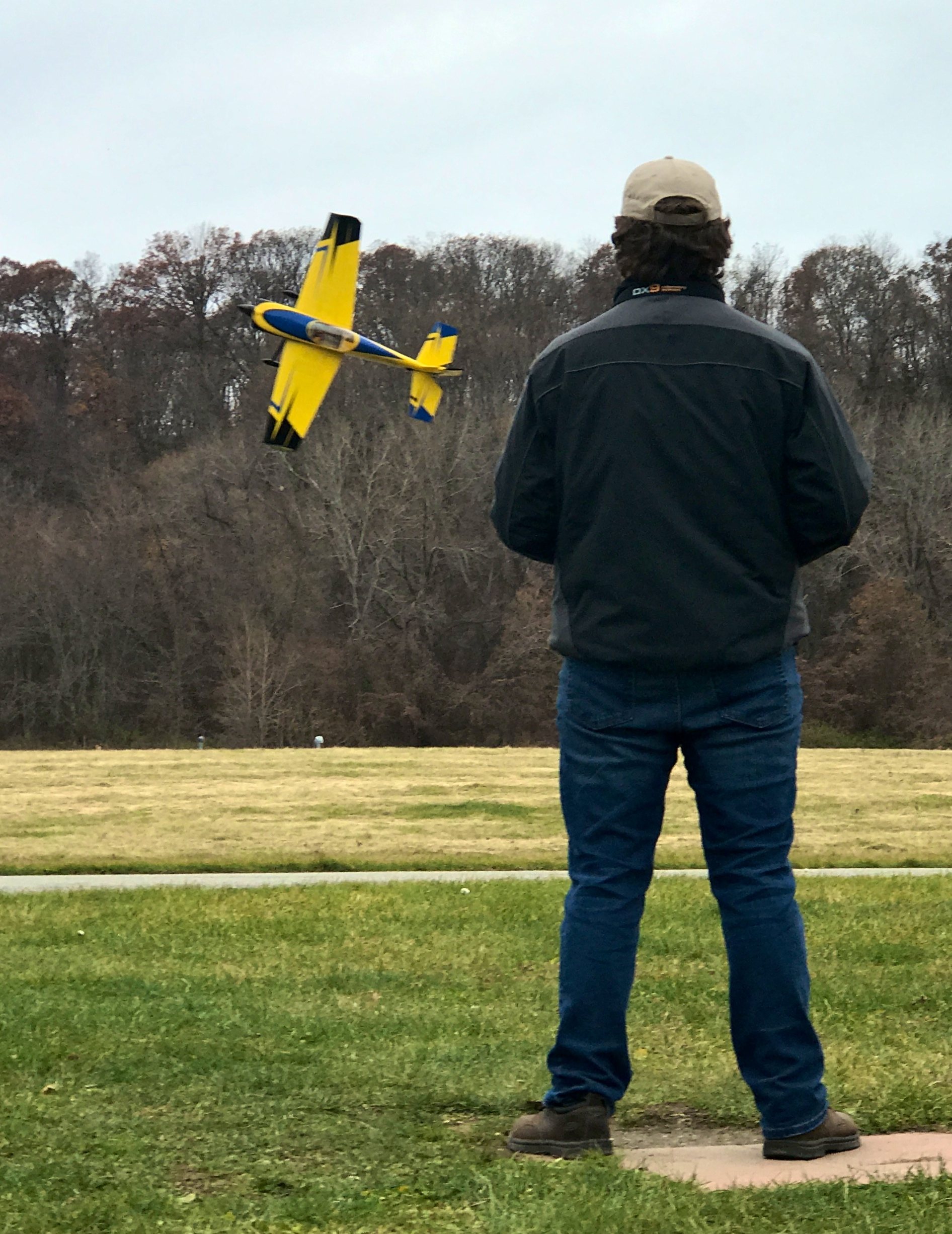
An RC flyer demonstrating knife edge flying

A radio-controlled aircraft (often called RC aircraft or RC plane) is a small flying machine that is radio controlled by an operator on the ground using a hand-held radio transmitter. The transmitter continuously communicates with a receiver within the craft that sends signals to servomechanisms (servos) which move the control surfaces based on the position of joysticks on the transmitter. The control surfaces, in turn, directly affect the orientation of the plane.

Flying RC aircraft as a hobby grew substantially from the 2000s with improvements in the cost, weight, performance, and capabilities of motors, batteries and electronics. Scientific, government, and military organizations are also using RC aircraft for experiments, gathering weather readings, aerodynamic modeling, and testing. A wide variety of models, parts, and styles is available for the DIY market.

Nowadays, distinct from recreational civilian aeromodelling activities, unmanned aerial vehicle (drones) or spy planes add a video, GPS or autonomous feature, enabling instrumental RLOS or BLOS capabilities, which are used for public service (firefighting, disaster recovery, etc.) or commercial purposes, and if in the service of a military or paramilitary, may be armed.

== History ==
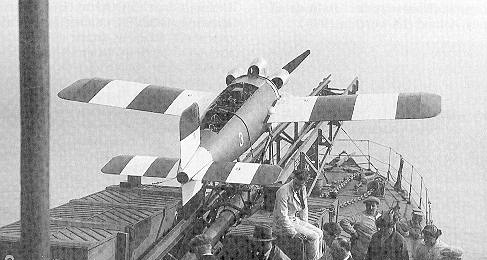
RAE Larynx on cordite fired catapult of destroyer HMS Stronghold, July 1927. The man on the box is Dr George Gardner, later Director of the RAE

The earliest examples of electronically guided model aircraft were hydrogen-filled model airships of the late 19th century. They were flown as a music hall act around theater auditoriums using a basic form of spark-emitted radio signal.

The British drone weapons in 1917 and 1918 evolved and their development continued through the work of the Royal Aircraft Establishment resulting in the fleet of over 400 Queen Bee UAV Target Aircraft in the 1930s.

During World War II, the U.S. Army and Navy used radio controlled planes called Radioplanes as artillery target drones.

The National Model Aviation Museum located in Muncie, Indiana hosts the world's largest collection of RC aviation history. They display models from every era of RC donated by the RC community around the world. They also have kit plans (aircraft blueprints) that RC pilots can purchase to build models from every era. The museum is located on the same grounds that the Academy of Model Aeronautics main office is located.

== Types ==
There are many types of radio-controlled aircraft. For beginning hobbyists, there are park flyers and trainers. For more experienced pilots there are glow-plug engine, electric-powered, and sailplane aircraft. For expert flyers, jets, pylon racers, VTOL planes, helicopters, autogyros, 3D aircraft, and other high-end competition aircraft provide adequate challenge. Some models are made to look and operate like a bird instead.

=== Radio-control scale aircraft modeling ===
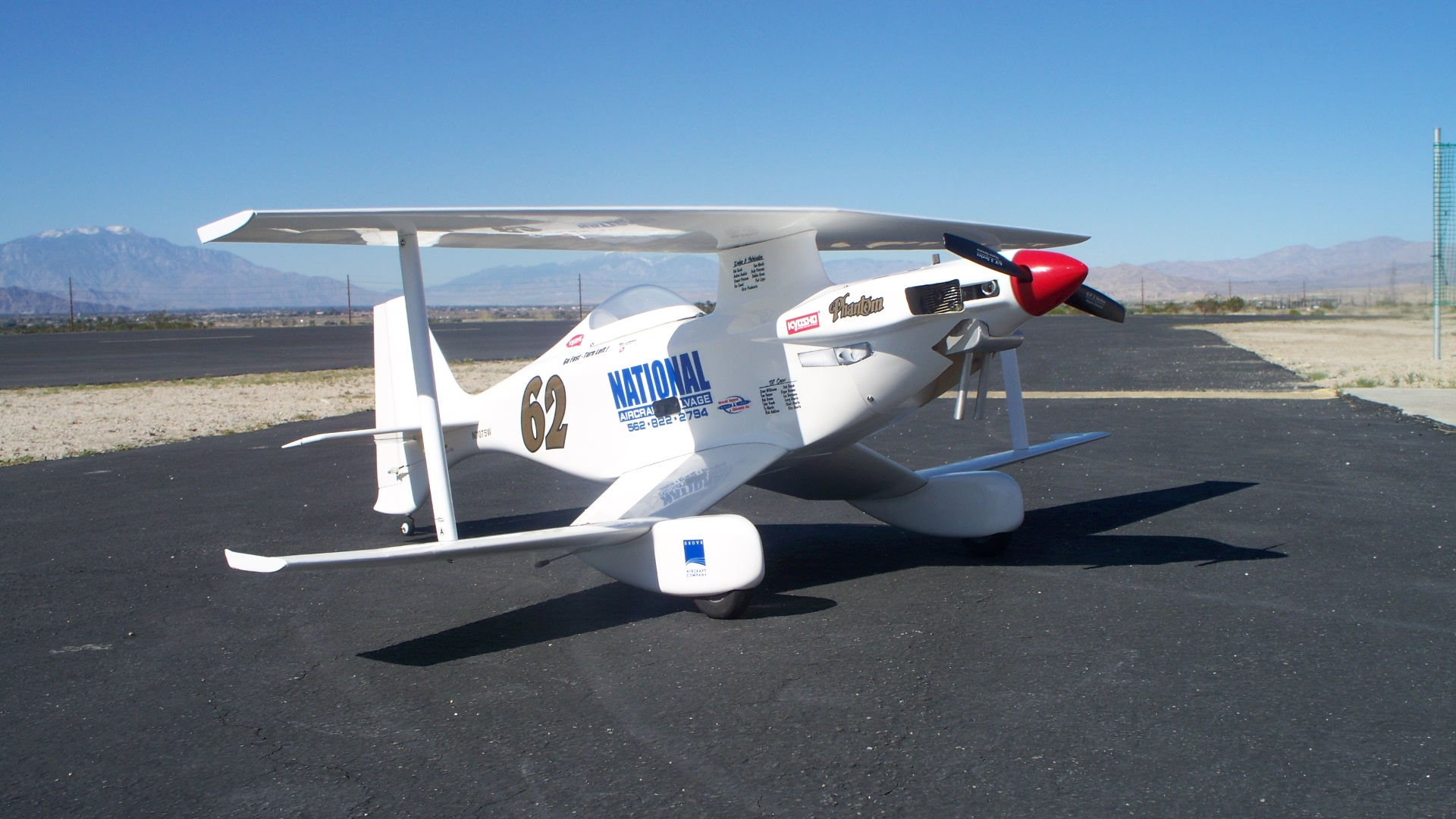
This Kyosho "Phantom 70" biplane is a semi-scale replica of a class winner and record holder from the 2007 Reno Air Races. In this example, the fuselage with its complex curves as well as the engine cowl, wheel pants and wing struts are rendered in fiberglass. The wings and horizontal stabilizer are traditional balsa/plywood construction

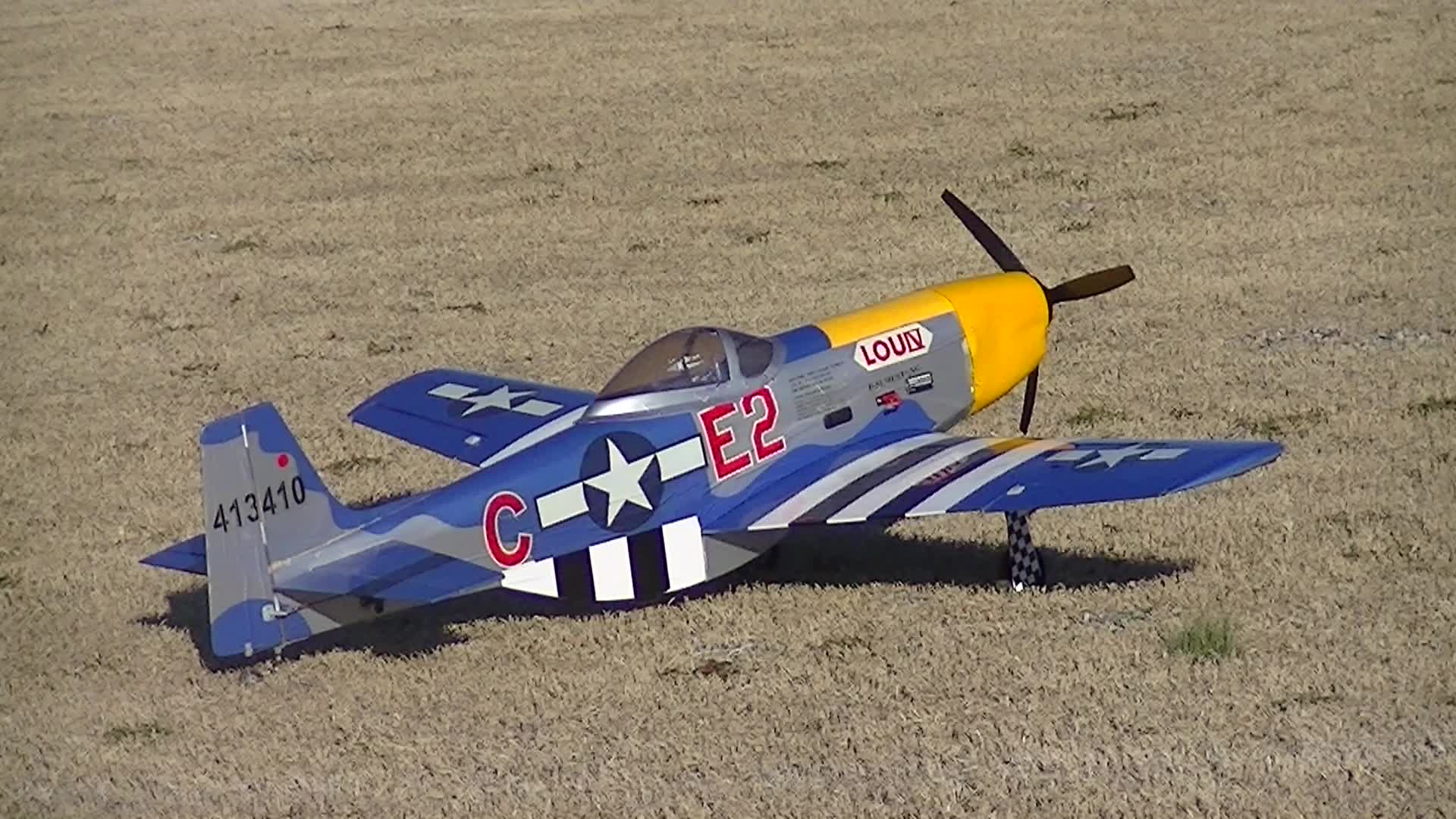
A large (~40 inch wingspan) scale remote control P-51 Mustang.

Perhaps the most realistic form of aeromodeling, in its main purpose to replicate full-scale aircraft designs from aviation history, for testing of future aviation designs, or even to realize never-built "proposed" aircraft, is that of radio-control scale aeromodeling, as the most practical way to re-create "vintage" full-scale aircraft designs for flight once more, from long ago. RC Scale model aircraft can be of any type of steerable airship lighter-than-air (LTA) aviation craft, or more normally, of the heavier-than-air fixed wing glider/sailplane, fixed-wing single or multi-engine aircraft, or rotary-wing aircraft such as autogyros or helicopters.

Full-scale aircraft designs from every era of aviation, from the "Pioneer Era" and World War I's start, through to the 21st century, have been modeled as radio-control scale model aircraft. Builders of RC Scale aircraft can enjoy the challenge of creating a controllable, miniature aircraft that merely "looks" like the full scale original in the air with no "fine details", such as a detailed cockpit, or seriously replicate many operable features of a selected full scale aircraft design, even down to having operable cable-connected flight control surfaces, illuminated navigation lighting on the aircraft's exterior, realistically retracting landing gear, etc. if the full-sized aircraft possessed such features as part of its design.

Various scale sizes of RC scale aircraft have been built in the decades since modern digital-proportional, miniaturized RC gear came on the market in the 1960s, and everything from indoor-flyable electric powered RC Scale models, to "giant scale" RC Scale models, in scale size ranges that usually run from 20% to 25%, and upwards to 30 to 50% size of some smaller full scale aircraft designs, that can replicate some of the actual flight characteristics of the full scale aircraft they are based on, have been enjoyed, and continue to be built and flown, in sanctioned competition and for personal pleasure, as part of the RC scale aeromodelling hobby.

=== Sailplanes and gliders ===
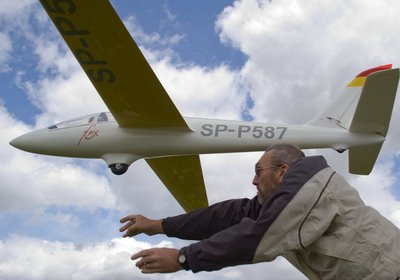
Hand-launching a glider

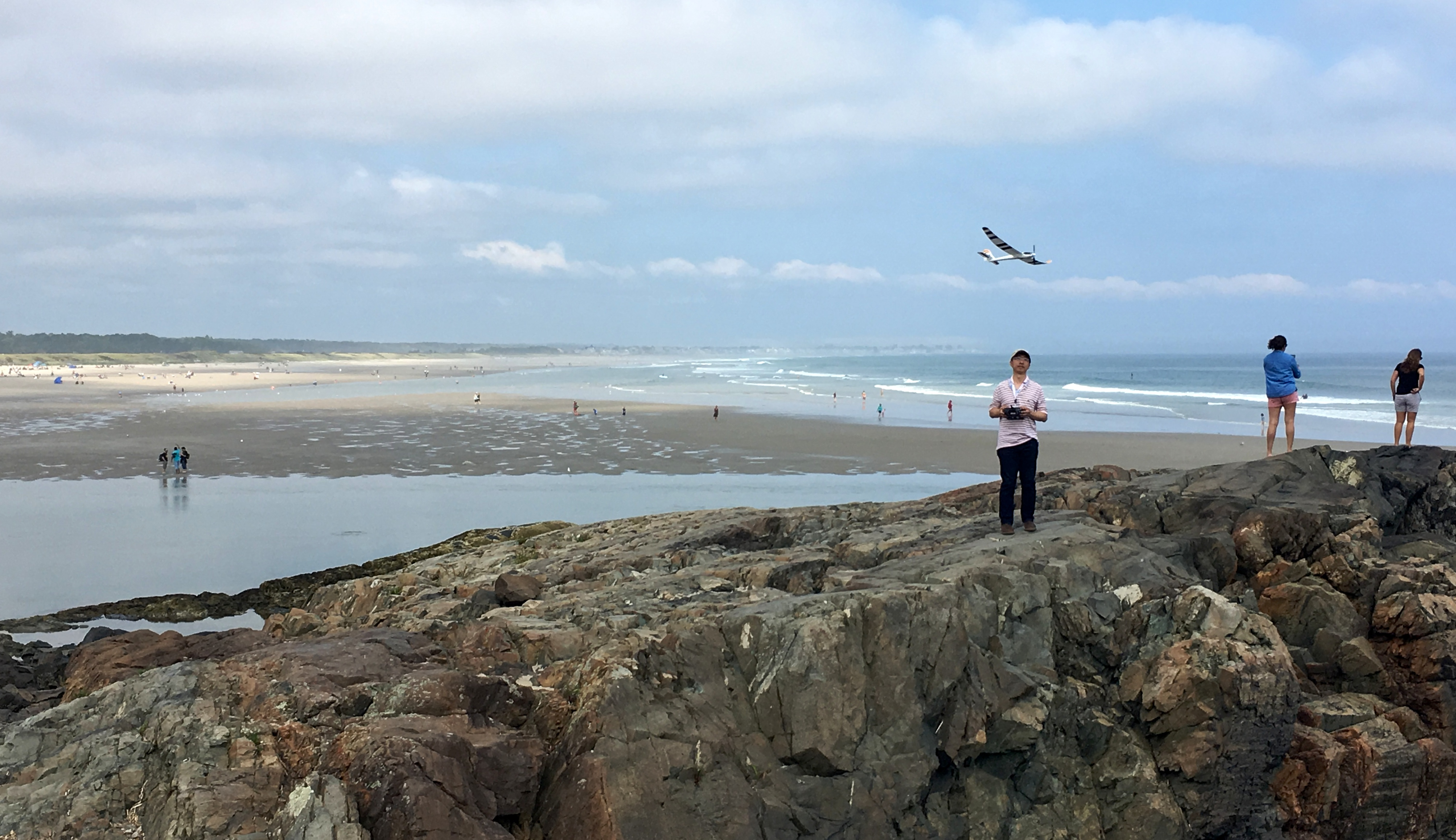
Powered glider by the ocean

Gliders are planes that do not typically have any type of propulsion. They can be towed into the air by use of another aircraft with an engine, and once at a high altitude, the glider can release from the tow rope. Unpowered glider flight must be sustained through exploitation of the natural lift produced from thermals or wind hitting a slope. Dynamic soaring is another popular way of providing energy to gliders that is becoming more and more common. However, even conventional slope soaring gliders are capable of achieving speeds comparable with similar sized powered craft. Gliders are typically partial to slow flying and have high aspect ratio, as well as very low wing loading (weight to wing area ratio). Two and three-channel gliders which use only rudder control for steering and dihedral or polyhedral wing shape to automatically counteract rolling are popular as training craft, due to their ability to fly very slowly and high tolerance to error.

Powered gliders have recently seen an increase in popularity. By combining the efficient wing size and wide speed envelope of a glider airframe with an electric motor, it is possible to achieve long flight times and high carrying capacity, as well as glide in any suitable location regardless of thermals or lift. A common method of maximising flight duration is to quickly fly a powered glider upwards to a chosen altitude and descending in an unpowered glide. Folding propellers which reduce drag (as well as the risk of breaking the propeller) are standard. Powered gliders built with stability in mind and capable of aerobatics, high speed flight and sustained vertical flight are classified as 'Hot-liners'. 'Warm-liners' are powered craft with similar abilities but less extreme thrust capability.

=== Jets ===
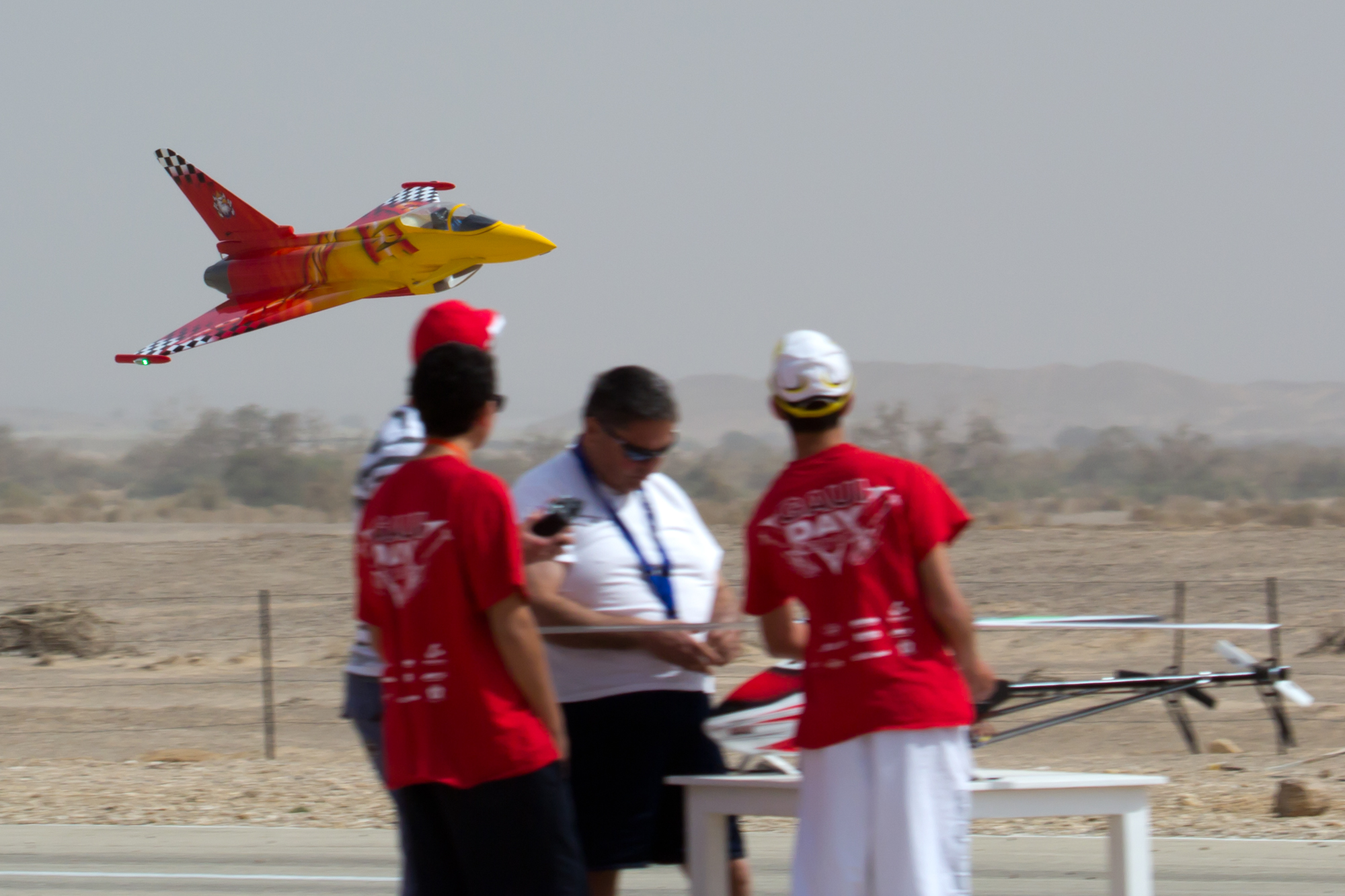
A model jet flies past model helicopter pilots

Jets commonly use a micro turbine or ducted fan to power them. Most airframes are constructed from fiber glass and carbon fiber. For electric powered flight which are usually powered by electric ducted fans, may be made of styrofoam. Inside the aircraft, wooden spars reinforce the body to make a rigid airframe. They also have kevlar fuel tanks for the Jet A fuel that they run on. Most micro turbines start with propane, burn for a few seconds before introducing the jet fuel by solenoid. These aircraft can often reach speeds in excess of 320 km/h (200 mph). The high speed requires greater skill to operate.

In the U.S.A. the FAA restricts flying of such aircraft to approved AMA Academy of Model Aeronautics sites, where only certified turbine pilots may fly. Also, the AMA requires model aviation enthusiasts who wish to operate miniature gas turbine powered RC model aircraft, to be certified in the operation of the type of gas turbine engine, and all aspects of safety in operating such a turbine-powered model aircraft, that they need to know in flying their model. Some military bases allow such high tech aircraft to fly within limited airspace such as Kaneohe Marine base in Hawaii, and Whidbey Island NAS in Washington State.

An average turbine aircraft will cost between US$150–US$10,000 with more than US$20,000 all-up becoming more common. Many manufactures sell airframes such as Yellow Aircraft and Skymaster. Turbines are produced from The Netherlands (AMT) to Mexico (Artes Jets). The average microturbine will cost between US$2500 and US$5000 depending on engine output.

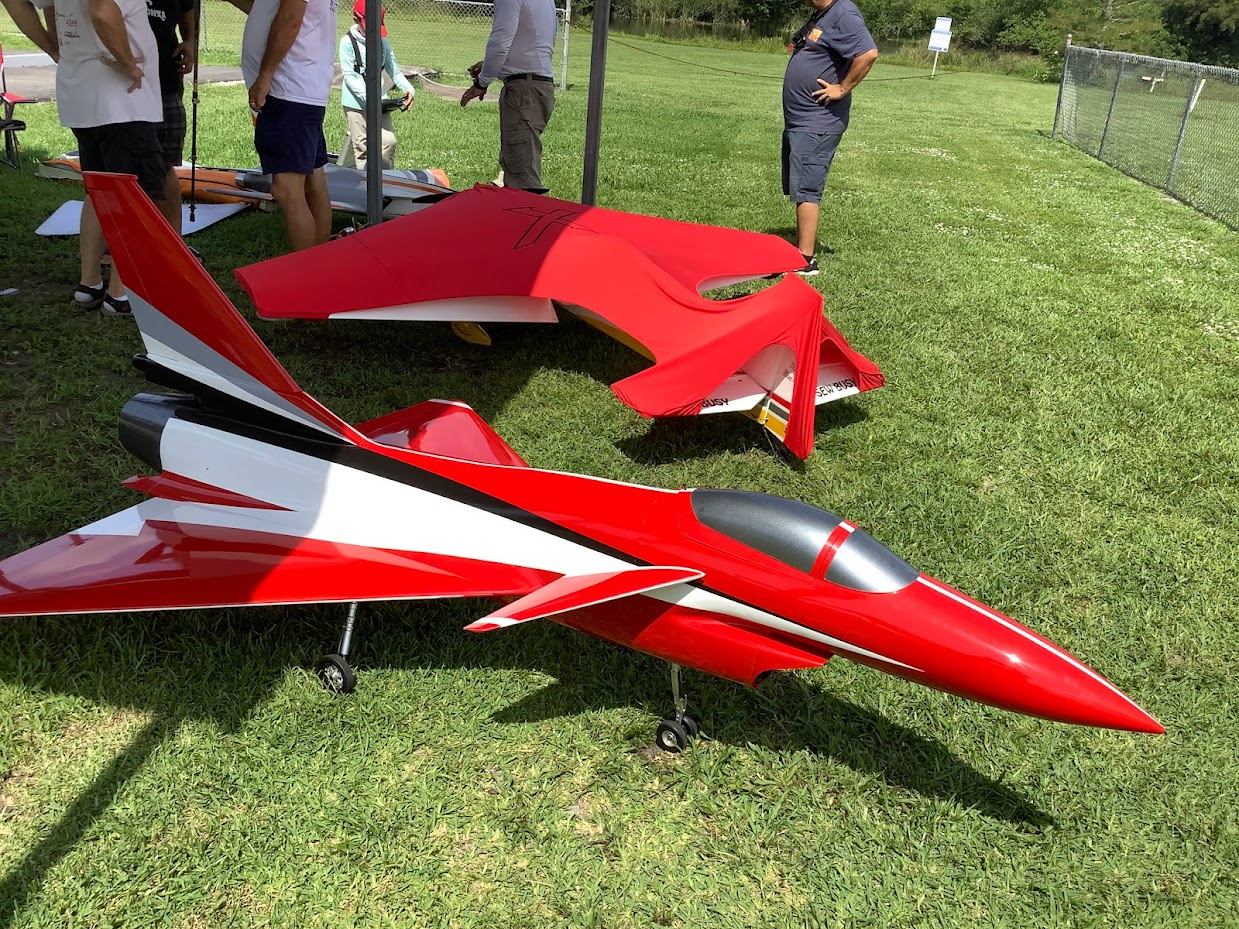
A CARF Models Chengdu J-10 turbine

Smaller turbines put out about 12 lbf (53 N) of thrust, while larger microturbines can put out as much as 45 lbf (200 N) of thrust. Radio-control jets require an onboard FADEC (full authority digital engine control) controller; this controls the turbine, as on a full-size aircraft. RC jets also require electrical power. Most have a lithium polymer (LiPo) battery pack at 8–12 volts that controls the FADEC. There is also a LiPo for the onboard servos that control ailerons, elevator, rudder, flaps and landing gear.

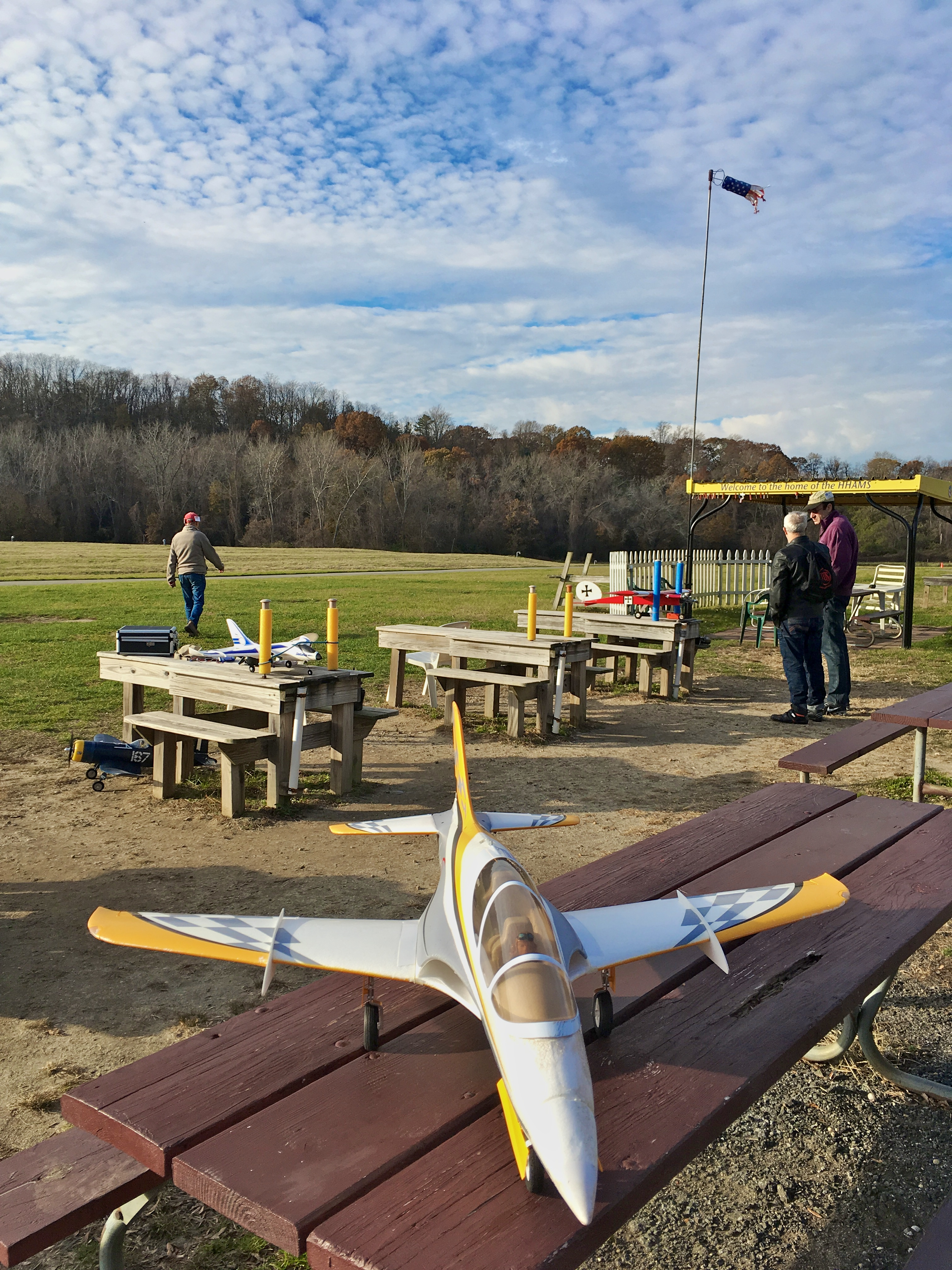
EDF jet at a flying field

Of much less complexity are the types of RC jet aircraft that actually use an electric motor-driven ducted fan instead to power the aircraft. So called "EDF" models can be of much smaller size, and only need the same electronic speed controller and rechargeable battery technology as propeller-driven RC electric powered aircraft use.

Radio-controlled jet aircraft are produced in the colors of various airlines. Among the most popular airline liveries used by modelers are those of American, Singapore, Pan Am, Etihad and Delta Air Lines.

=== Sports planes ===
Sports planes are planes capable of performing aerobatic maneuvers involving aircraft attitudes that are not used in normal flight. Typical aerobatic maneuvers include inside loop, outside loop, Immelmann turn, inverted flight, stall turn, slow roll and Cuban 8.

=== 3D planes ===
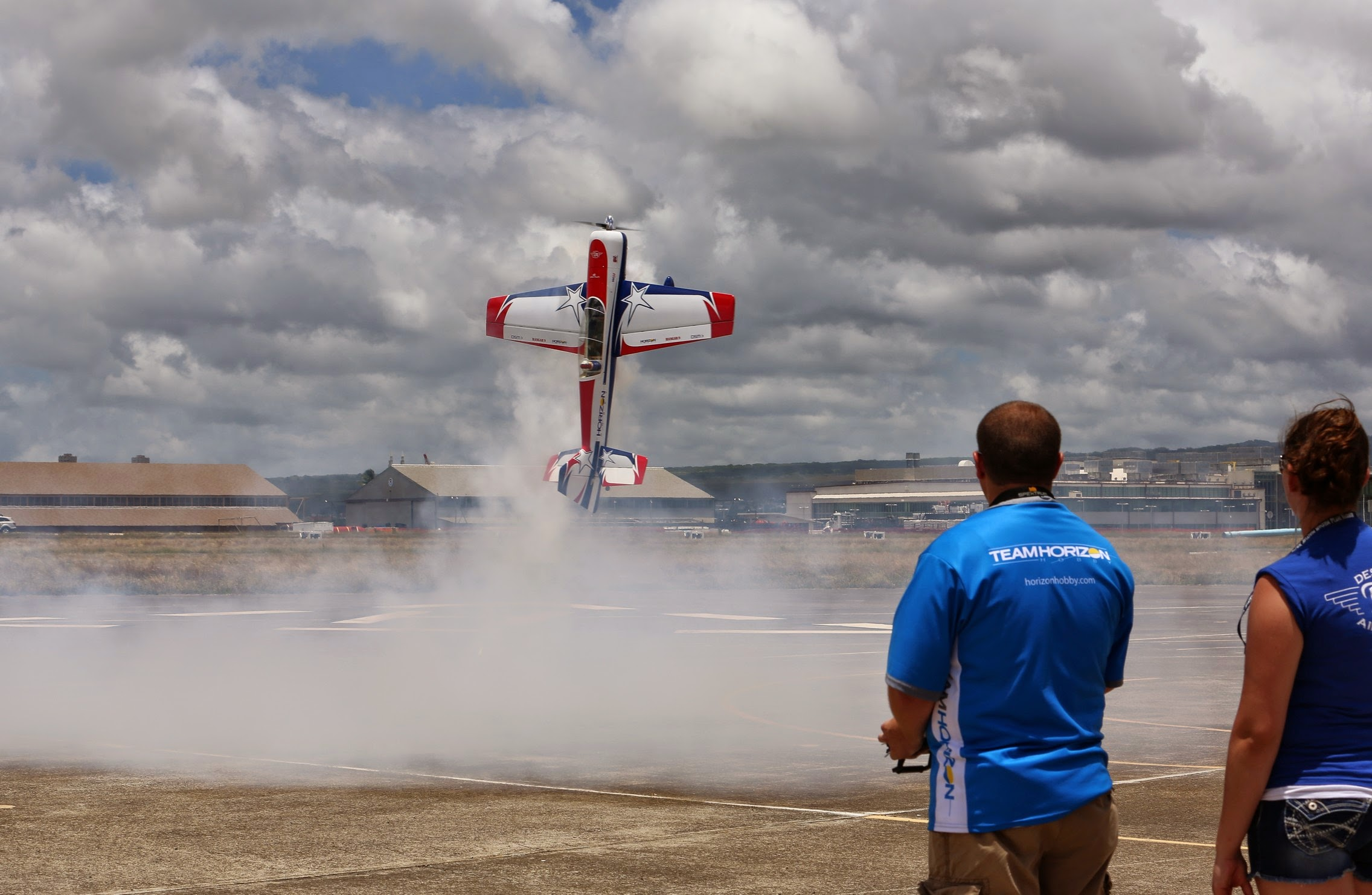
A 3D plane hovers in place.

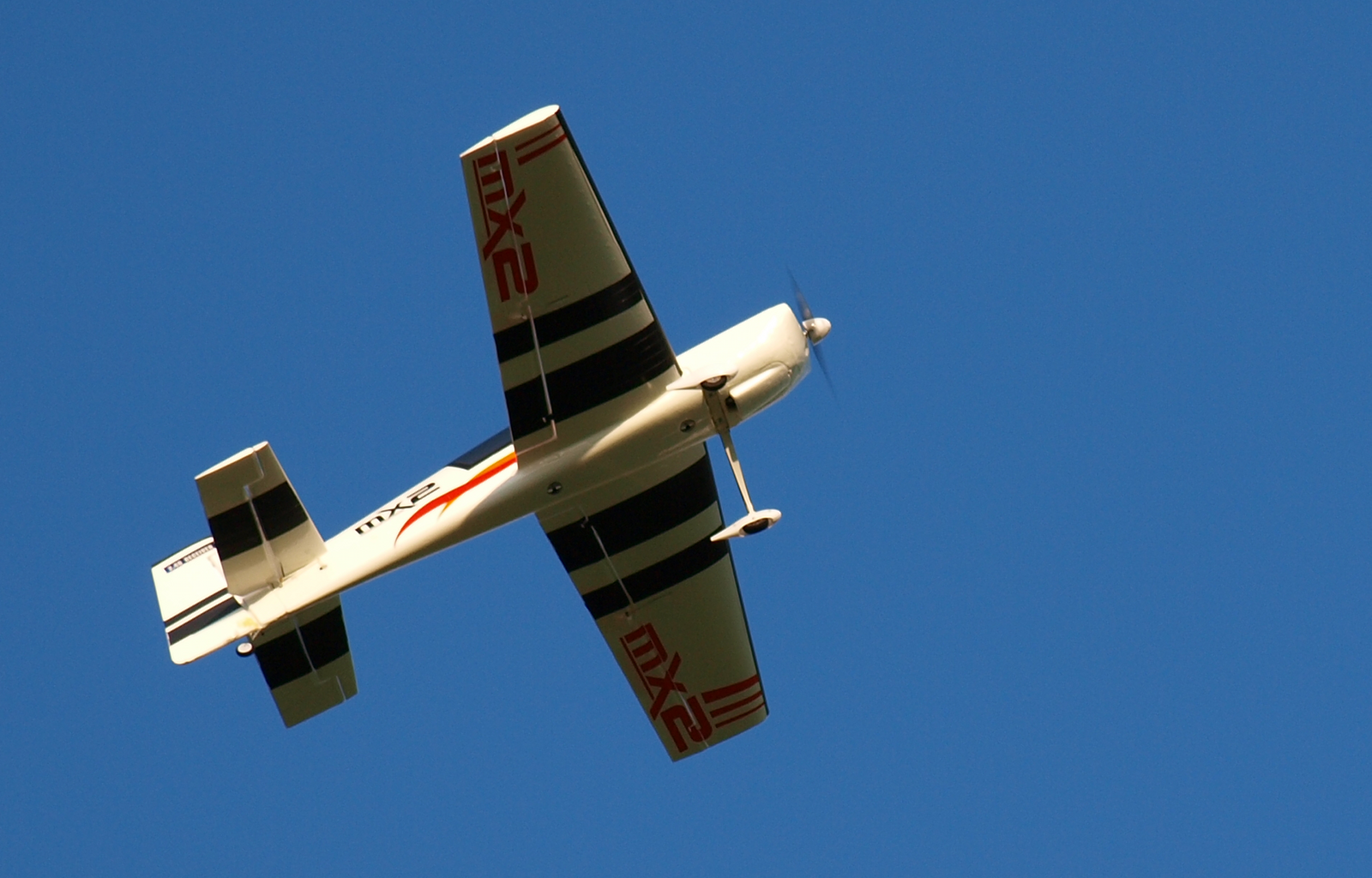
Model of an mx2, a 3D aerobatic aircraft with a wingspan of 121 cm

3D flight is a type of flying in which model aircraft have a thrust-to-weight ratio of more than 1:1 (typically 1.5:1 or more), large control surfaces with extreme throws, low weight compared to other models of same size and relatively low wing loadings. Simply put, 3D flight is the art of flying a plane below its stall speed (the speed at which the wings of the plane can no longer generate enough lift to keep the plane in the air).

These elements allow for spectacular aerobatics such as hovering, 'harriers', torque rolling, blenders, rolling circles, flat spins, and more; maneuvers that are performed below the stall speed of the model. The type of flying could be referred to as 'on the prop' as opposed to 'on the wing', which would describe more conventional flight patterns that make more use of the lifting surfaces of the plane.

3D has created a huge market for electric indoor 'profile' types similar to the Ikarus 'Shockflyers' designed to be able to fly inside a gym or outside in little wind. These generally make use of small brushless motors (often outrunners, but also geared inrunners) and lithium polymer batteries (Li-Po). There are also many larger 3D designs designed for two and four stroke glow engines, two stroke gas engines and large electric power systems.

=== Pylon racers ===
Racers are small propeller-driven aircraft that race around a 2, 3, or 4 pylon track. They tend to be hard to see and can often go over 240 km/h (150 mph), though some people do pylon races with much slower aircraft. Several different types of aircraft are raced across the world, those flown primarily in the US are; Q500 (424 or ARPRA, and 428), and Q40.

424 is designed as a starting point into the world of pylon racing. Inexpensive (under US$200 for the airframe) kits with wing areas of 3,200 square centimetres (500 sq in) are flown with 0.40" size engines that can be purchased for less than US$100. The goal is for the planes to be not only inexpensive, but closely matched in performance. This places the emphasis on good piloting. APRA is a version of 424 with specific rules designed for consistency.

428 aircraft are similar to 424 in appearance. The difference is in engine performance and construction. The planes are primarily made of fiberglass with composites used at high load points. Wings are often hollow to save weight. (All aircraft must meet a minimum weight. A lighter wing moves more of the weight closer to the center of gravity. This requires less control deflection and its resulting drag to change the planes attitude.) They also use .40 cu in size engines but unlike 424 they are much more expensive. They have been designed to put out the maximum amount of power at a specific RPM using a specific fuel. Nelson manufactures the most predominantly used engine. Speeds are very fast in this class with planes capable of reaching 265 km/h (165 mph).

Q40 is the highpoint of pylon racing, as their aircraft resemble full-size race planes. They are not limited to the simple shapes that Q500 planes are, which have much cleaner aerodynamics and less wing area. They use the same basic Nelson engine used in 428, but the engine is tuned to turn a much smaller prop at a much higher rpm. These planes can fly in excess of 320 km/h (200 mph) on the course. Because of their limited wing area however, Q40 planes must fly a larger arc around the pylons to conserve energy. Although faster, they ultimately fly a larger course. The best times for a 10 lap 3 pylon Q40 race are very close to the same in 428.

F3D is the fastest class in "glow-powered" pylon racing. These planes reach speeds of over 100 m/s (225 mph) on the race course. The race course is the same as in AMA 424 or AMA 428, but there are few limits on the airframe and engine. The maximum engine displacement is .40ci, ignition must be a glowplug, fuel must be 80% methanol/20% castor oil, all else is free. There are airframe limits on wing thickness, fuselage dimensions, and weight for safety reasons.

=== Park flyers and micro planes ===
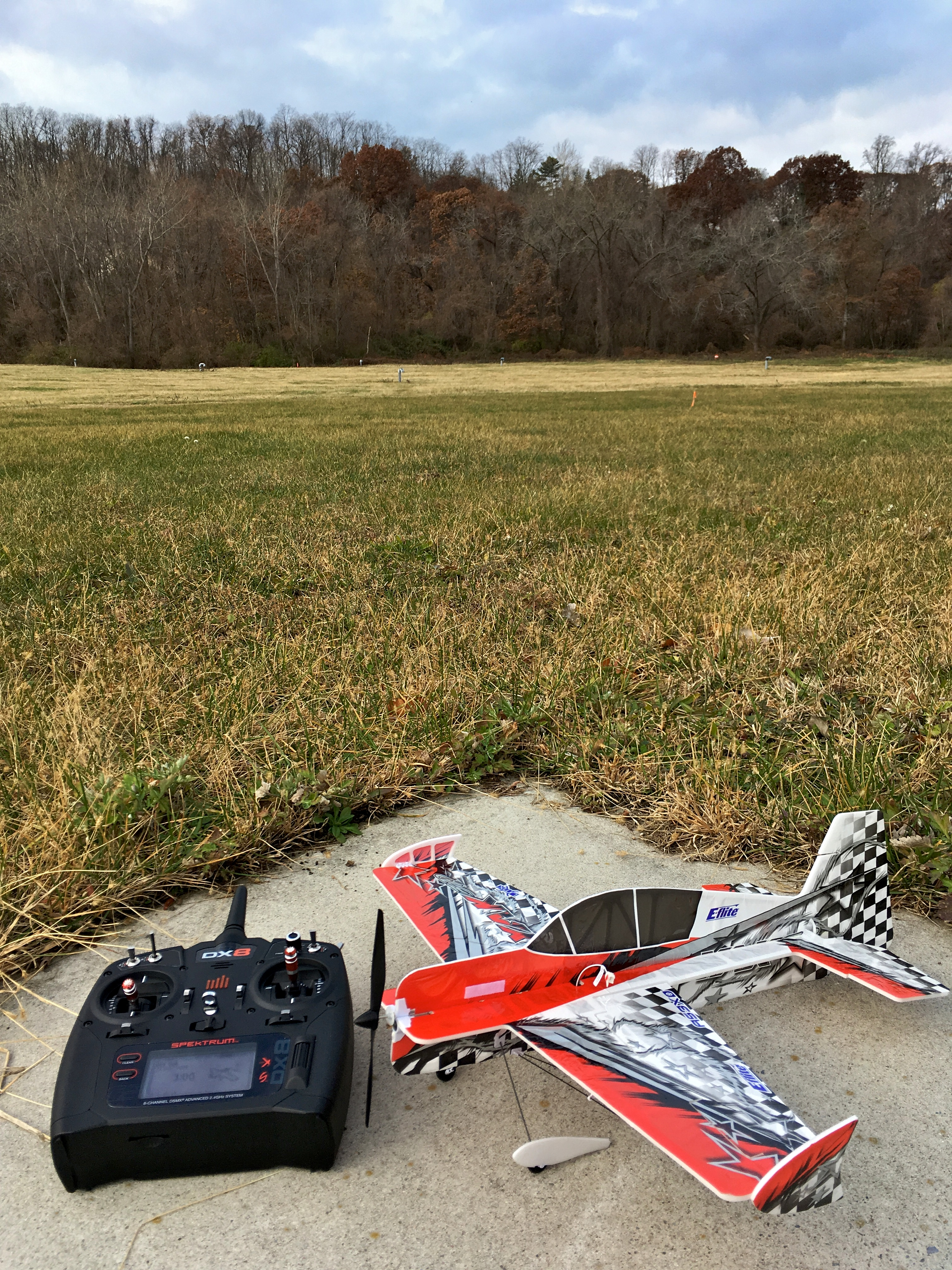
Micro-sized 3D plane

Park flyers are small, primarily electric-powered planes, so named because their size enables some of them to be operated within the confines of a large public park. The smallest park flyers are called micro planes, and are slow and docile enough to fly within an enclosed area such as a gymnasium or even a living room.

Because of their size and ease of setup, ready-to-fly park flyers are a popular class of RC aircraft. Advanced electronic and material technologies have even popularized high-performance, park flyer sized "3D-flyers", or fully aerobatic aircraft, capable of extreme high-g maneuvers and even nose-up hovering. 3D flight is now possible both in- and outdoors with certain models of this type.

Park flyers have created an inexpensive way for beginners to get involved in the hobby of RC flight. The materials used in the simple construction of these aircraft make field repairs possible even after significant crash damage. Their small size and quiet operation make it possible to fly them in residential areas.

=== Helicopters ===
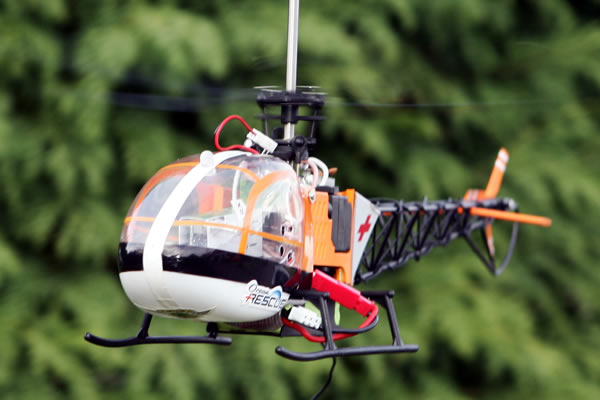
RC helicopter

Radio-controlled helicopters, although often grouped with RC aircraft, are in a class of their own due to the vast differences in construction, aerodynamics and flight training. Hobbyists will often venture from planes, to jets and to helicopters as they enjoy the challenges, excitement and satisfaction of flying different types of aircraft. Some radio-controlled helicopters have photo or video cameras installed and are used for aerial imaging or surveillance. Newer "3d" radio-control helicopters can fly inverted with the advent of advanced swash heads, and servo linkage that enables the pilot to immediately reverse the pitch of the blades, creating a reverse in thrust.

=== Flying bird models, or ornithopters ===
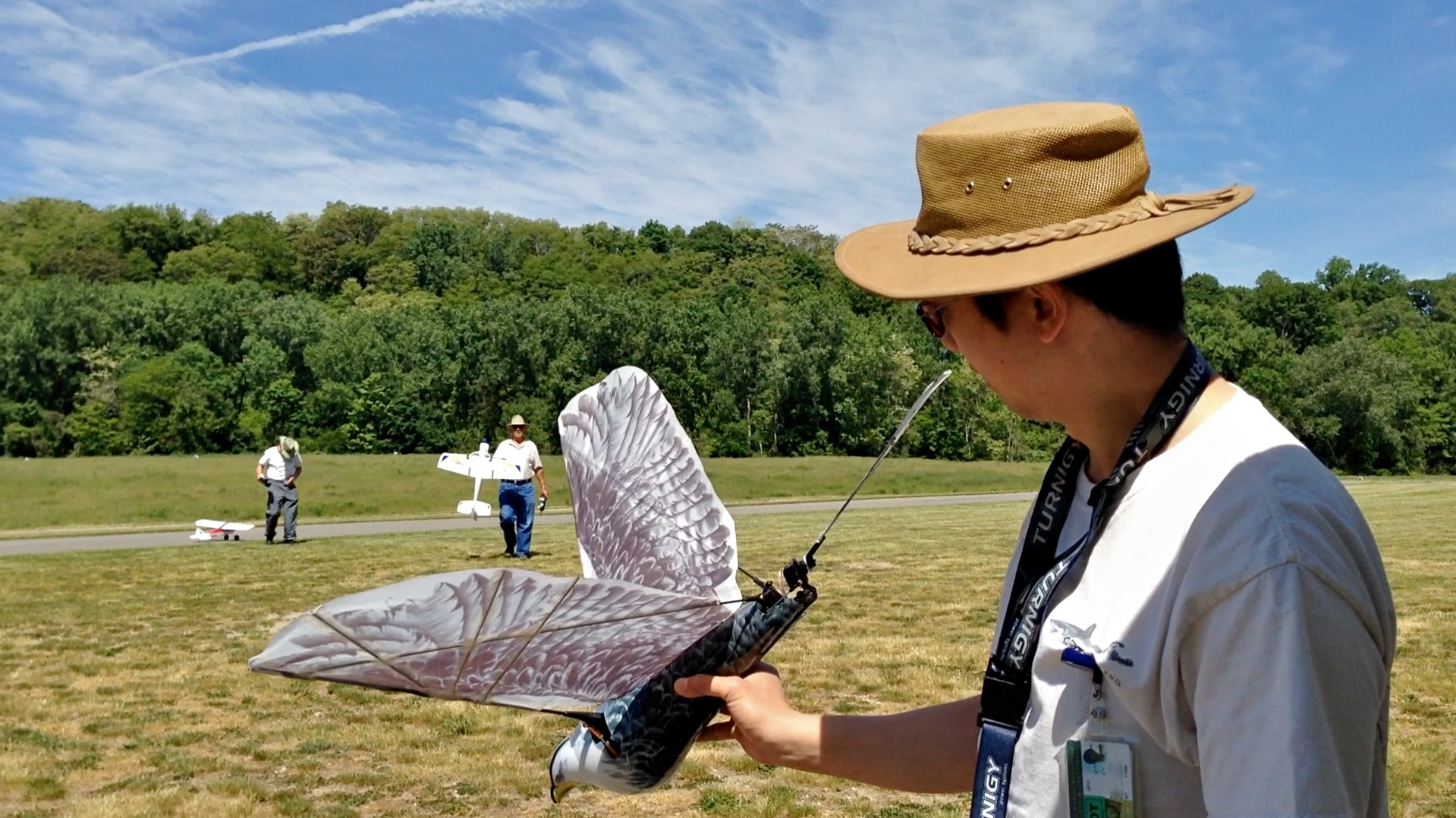
Skyonme Spybird ornithopter

Some RC models take their inspiration from nature. These may be gliders made to look like a real bird, but more often they actually fly by flapping wings. Spectators are often surprised to see that such a model can really fly. These factors as well as the added building challenge add to the enjoyment of flying bird models, though some ARF (almost-ready-to-fly) models are available. Flapping-wing models are also known as ornithopters, the technical name for an aircraft whose driving airfoils oscillate instead of rotate.

=== Toy-class RC ===
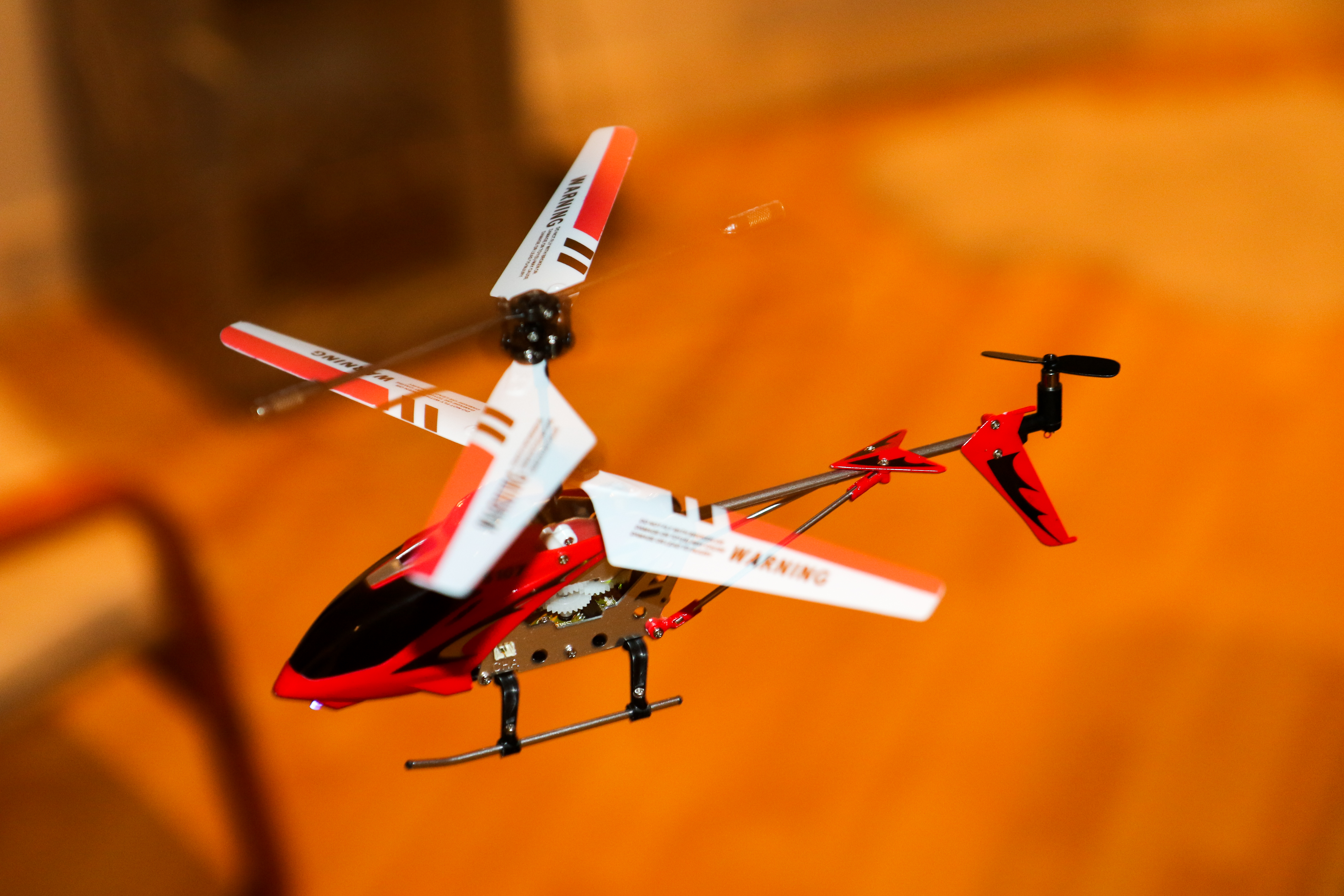
A popular toy helicopter

Since about 2004, new, more sophisticated toy RC airplanes, helicopters, and ornithopters have been appearing on toy store shelves. This new category of toy RC distinguishes itself by:

- Proportional (vs. "on-off") throttle control which is critical for preventing the excitation of phugoid oscillation ("porpoising") whenever a throttle change is made. It also allows for manageable and steady altitude control and reduction of altitude loss in turns.
- LiPo batteries for light weight and long flight time.
- EPP (Expanded Polypropylene) foam construction making them virtually indestructible in normal use.
- Low flying speed and typically rear-mounted propeller(s) make them less harmful when crashing into people and property.
- Stable spiral mode resulting in simple turning control where "rudder" input results in a steady bank angle rather than a steady roll rate.

As of 2013, the toy class RC airplane typically has no elevator control. This is to manage costs, but it also allows for simplicity of control by unsophisticated users of all ages. The downside of lack of elevator control is a tendency for the airplane to phugoid. To damp the phugoid oscillation naturally, the planes are designed with high drag which reduces flight performance and flying time. The lack of elevator control also prevents the ability to "pull back" during turns to prevent altitude loss and speed increase.

Costs range from 20 to US$40. Crashes are common and inconsequential. Throttle control and turning reversal (when flying toward the pilot) rapidly become second-nature, giving a significant advantage when learning to fly a more costly hobby class RC aircraft.

== Video piloting (first-person view or FPV) ==
First-person view (FPV) flight is a type of remote-control flying and a distinguishing feature of a drone. It involves mounting a small video camera and television transmitter on an RC aircraft and flying by means of a live video down-link, commonly displayed on video goggles or a portable LCD screen. When flying FPV, the pilot sees from the aircraft's perspective, and does not even have to look at the model. As a result, FPV aircraft can be flown well beyond visual range, limited only by the range of the remote control, video transmitter and endurance of the aircraft.

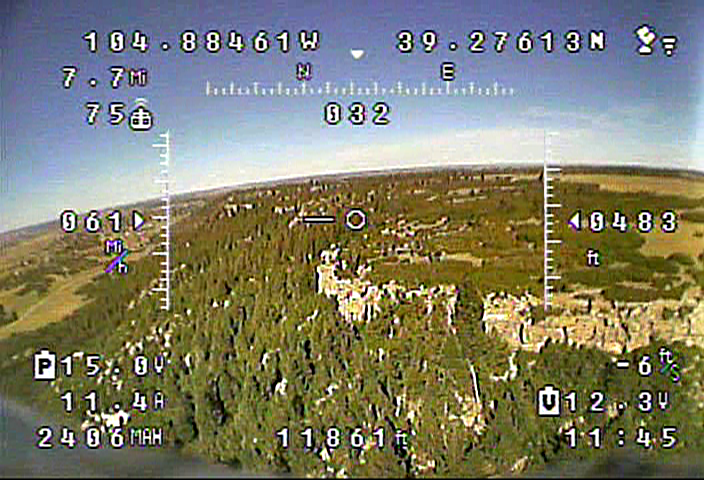
A typical FPV video feed with an on-screen display showing navigational data

Video transmitters typically operate at a power level between 200 mW and 2500 mW. The most common frequencies used for video transmission are 900 MHz, 1.2 GHz, 2.4 GHz, and 5.8 GHz. Specialized long-range UHF control systems operating at 433 MHz (for amateur radio licensees only) or 869 MHz are commonly used to achieve greater control range, while the use of directional, high-gain antennas increases video range. Sophisticated setups are capable of achieving a range of 20–30 miles or more. FPV aircraft are frequently used for aerial photography and videography, and many videos of FPV flights can be found on video sites such as YouTube and Vimeo.

A basic FPV system consists of a camera, video transmitter, video receiver, and a display. More advanced setups commonly add a flight controller, including an on-screen display (OSD), auto-stabilizer and return-to-home (RTL) functions. An RTL function is usually applied with a failsafe in order to allow the aircraft to fly back to its home point on its own if the signal is lost. Some advanced controllers can also navigate the drone using GPS. On-board cameras can be equipped with a pan and tilt mount, which when coupled with video goggles and "head tracking" devices, creates a first-person experience, as if the pilot was actually sitting in the cockpit of the RC aircraft.

Both helicopter, multiple rotors and fixed-wing RC aircraft are used for FPV flight. The most commonly chosen airframes for FPV planes are models with sufficient payload space for a larger battery and large wings for excellent gliding ability. Suitable brushless motors are installed as the most common pushers to provide better flight performance and longer flight time. Pusher-propeller planes are preferred so that the propeller is not in view of the camera. Flying wing designs are also popular for FPV, as they provide a good combination of large wing surface area, speed, maneuverability, and gliding ability.

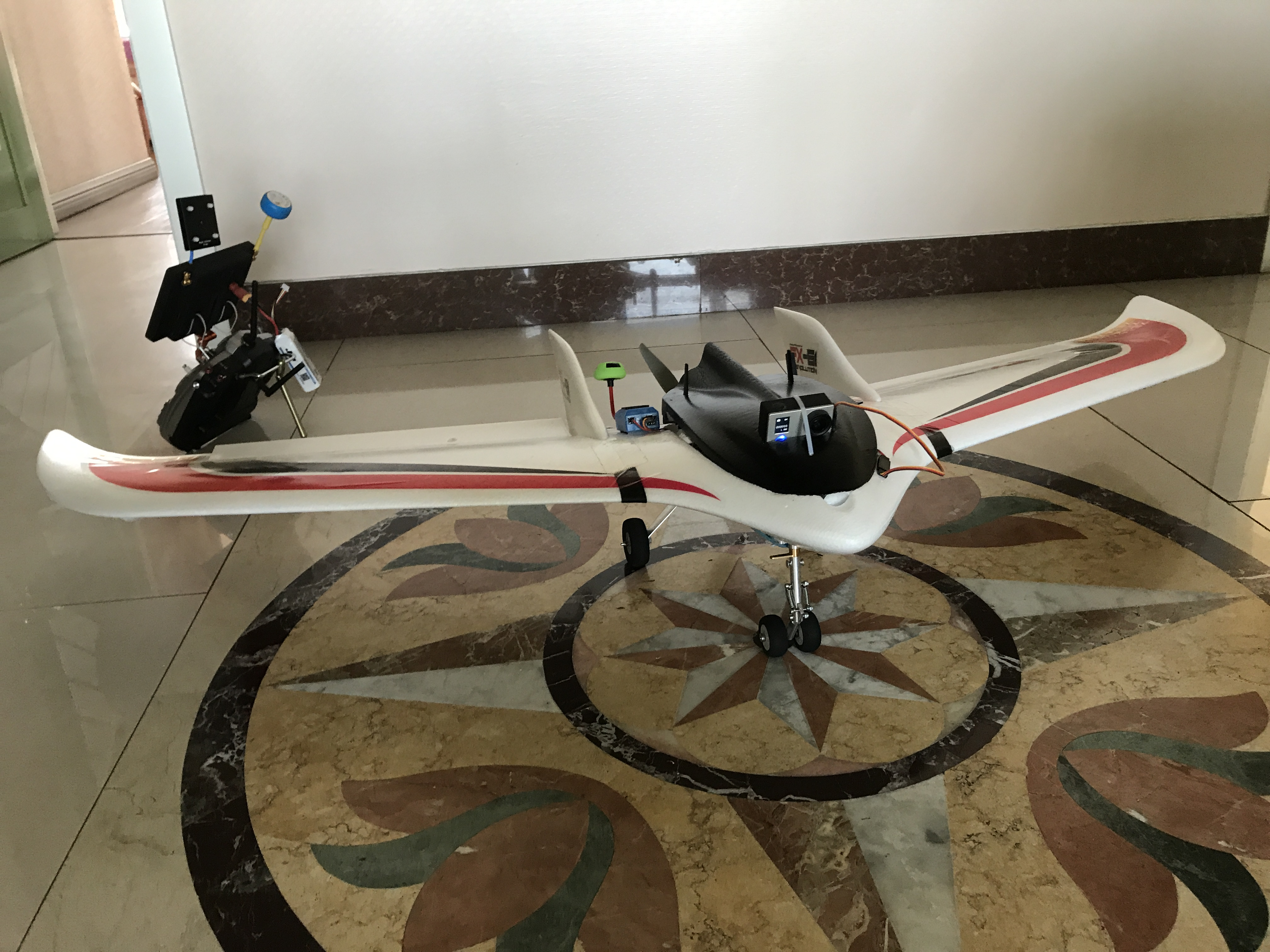
FX-61 Flying Wing with a mounted camera

In the United States, the Academy of Model Aeronautics' (AMA) Safety Code (which governs flying at AMA affiliated fields) allows FPV flight under the parameters of AMA Document #550, which requires that FPV aircraft be kept within visual line of sight with a spotter maintaining unaided visual contact with the model at all times. Similarly, in the United Kingdom, the Civil Aviation Authority (CAA) Air Navigation Order 2009 under General Exemption E 4185 requires small unmanned aircraft (SUA) be kept within visual line of sight with a competent observer maintaining direct unaided visual contact with the model at all times for the purpose of collision avoidance. Because these restrictions prohibit flying beyond the visual range of the pilot (an ability which many view as the most attractive aspect of FPV), most hobbyists that fly FPV do so outside of regular RC clubs and flying fields.

== Types of kits and construction ==
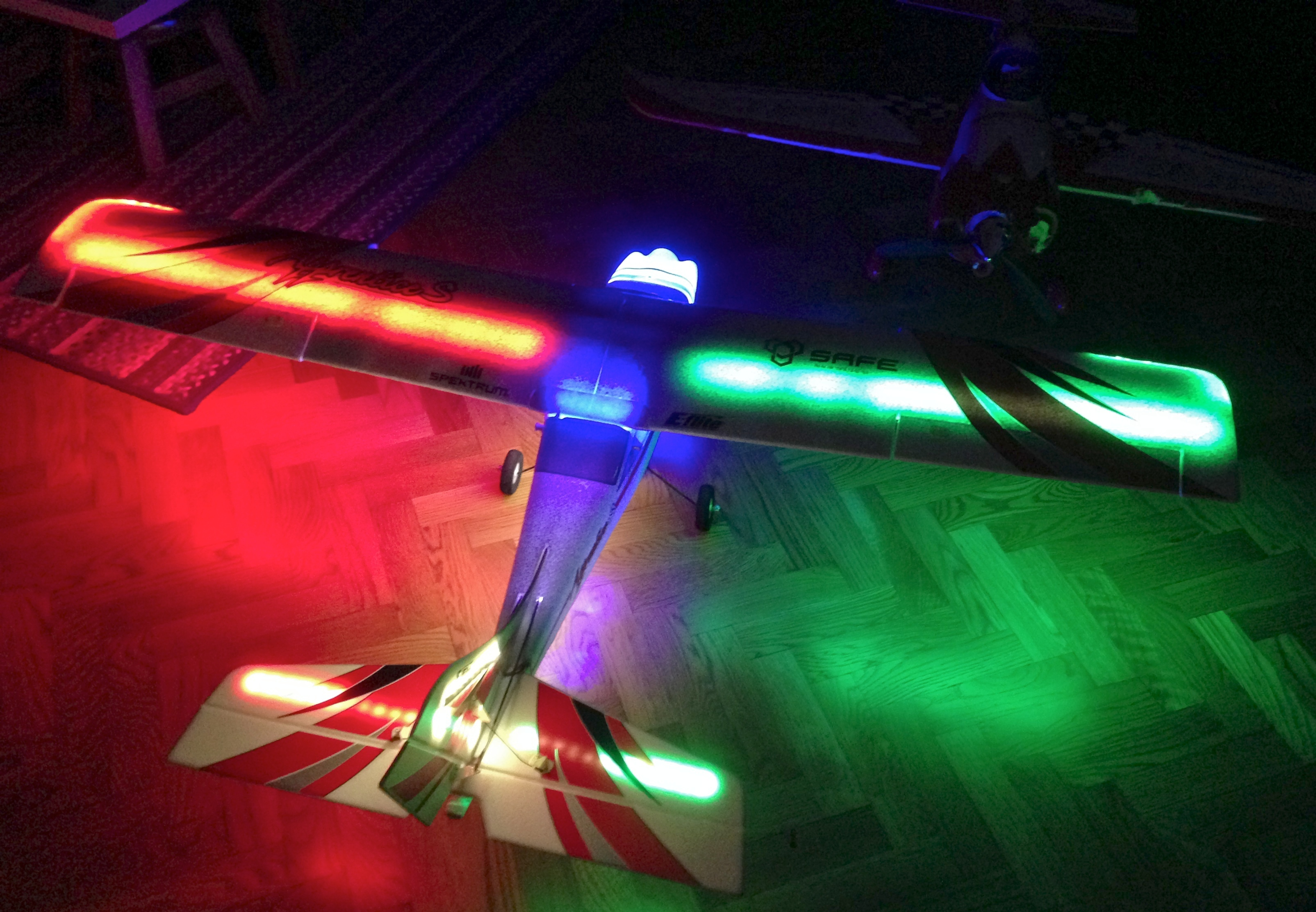
A "foamy" plane retrofitted with LED strips for night flying

There are various ways to construct and assemble an RC aeroplane. Various kits are available, requiring different amounts of assembly, different costs and varying levels of skill and experience.

Some kits can be mostly foam or plastic, or may be all balsa and ply wood. Construction of wood kits typically consists of using formers and longerons for the fuselage and spars and ribs for the wing and tail surfaces. Many designs use solid sheets of balsa wood instead of longerons to form the fuselage sides and may also use expanded polystyrene for the wing core covered in a wood veneer, often balsa or obeche. Such designs tend to be slightly heavier but are typically easier to build. The lightest models are suitable for indoor flight, in a windless environment. Some of these are made by bringing frames of balsa wood and carbon fiber up through water to pick up thin plastic films, similar to rainbow colored oil films. The advent of "foamies," or craft injection-molded from lightweight foam and sometimes reinforced with carbon fiber, have made indoor flight more readily accessible to hobbyists. EPP (Expanded Polypropylene) foam planes are actually even bendable and usually sustain very little or no damage in the event of an accident, even after a nose dive. Some companies have developed similar material with different names, such as AeroCell or Elapor.

Amateur hobbyists have more recently developed a range of new model designs utilizing corrugated plastic, also sold as Coroplast. These models are collectively called "SPADs" which stands for Simple Plastic Airplane Design. Fans of the SPAD concept tout increased durability, ease of building, and lower priced materials as opposed to balsa models, sometimes (though not always) at the expense of greater weight and crude appearance.

Flying models have to be designed according to the same principles as full-sized aircraft, and therefore their construction can be very different from most static models. RC planes often borrow construction techniques from vintage full-sized aircraft (although they rarely use metal structures).

=== Ready-to-Fly (RTF) ===
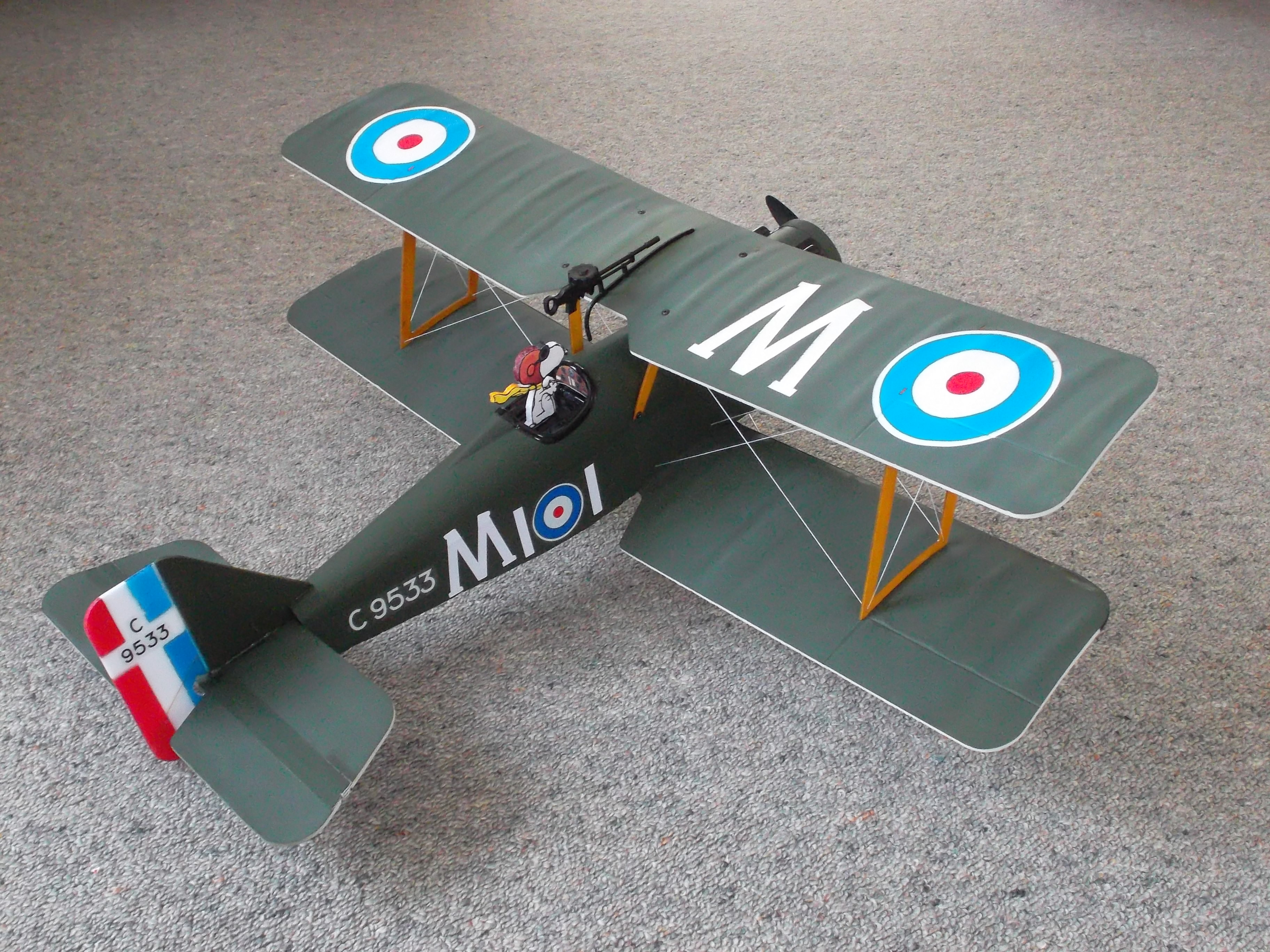
Radio-controlled model of S.E.5a W.W.1 aircraft constructed from an E-flite ARF kit (custom-made pilot added)

Ready to fly (RTF) airplanes come pre-assembled and usually only require wing attachment or other basic assembly. Typically, everything that is needed is provided, including the transmitter, receiver and battery. RTF airplanes can be up in the air in just a few minutes and have all but eliminated assembly time (at the expense of the model's configuration options.)

=== Almost Ready-to-Fly (ARF) ===
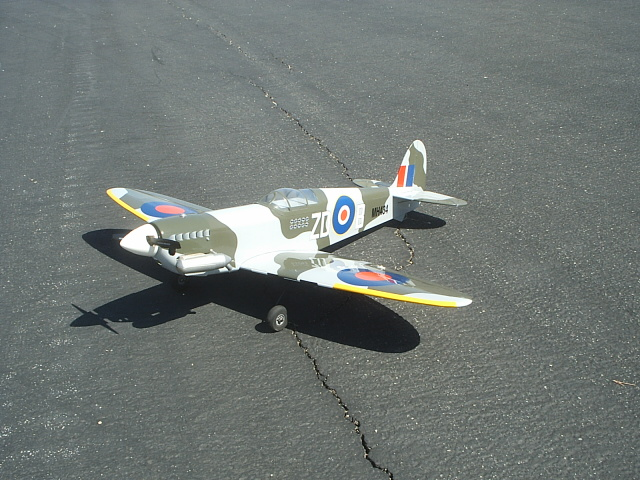
This Great Planes Supermarine Spitfire LF Mk XII wears the markings of the 222 Squadron and is an example of an almost ready to fly model

Almost ready to fly (ARF or ARTF) airplanes require final assembly typically including engine and fuel tank installation (or electric motor, speed controller, and battery), servo and pushrod installation, control surface attachment, landing gear attachment, and sometimes require gluing the left and right wing halves together. The average ARF airplane can be built with less than 10 to 20 hours of labor, versus 50 to 100+ hours (depending on detail and desired results) for a typical wood kit. The fuselage, wing halves, tail surfaces and control surfaces are already constructed. ARF airplanes typically only include the airframe and some accessories such as pushrods, fuel tank, etc. Therefore, the power system (glow engine, gas engine, or electric motor and any required accessories) and radio system (servos, transmitter, receiver, and battery) must be purchased separately.

Hobby Companies like Motion RC and Horizon Hobby have also began to sell ARF+ Models or ARF Plus which are models that are between a full ARF and PNP where they will have some electronics like control surface servos and retracts for the landing gear but will not include a power system (ESC and Motor)

=== Bind-N-Fly (BNF) ===
Bind-N-Fly (BNF) aircraft are similar to Ready to fly aircraft, except they do not come with a transmitter. Because they do not come with a transmitter, they must be bound to one instead. This is desirable for flyers that already own a transmitter. Like RTF aircraft, Bind-N-Fly models require minimal assembly.

There are several incompatible radio standards often found with Bind-N-Fly models. Most commonly seen are the BNF and Tx-R designations. BNF models work with transmitters using the DSM2/DSMX standard, and Tx-R models use the Tactic/AnyLink standard. A programmable transmitter which can store custom parameters for multiple models is desirable so that trim and other advanced functions do not need to be altered when switching models.

Receiver Ready (Rx-R) models are similar to BNF models in that they are mostly assembled but let the user add their own receiver and battery, avoiding the need to deal with transmitter incompatibilities.

=== Plug-N-Play (PNP) ===
A Plug-N-Play (PNP) electric RC airplane has the motor, ESC and servos installed but is missing the transmitter, receiver, and motor battery pack (& charger). In other words, the airplane comes 99% assembled just like an RTF one does, but you need to supply your own transmitter, receiver, and battery pack. Aeromodellers who want to buy and fly more than one RTF RC plane, but don't want to have a separate transmitter for each one often choose Plug-N-Play radio control planes .

=== Wood Kit ===
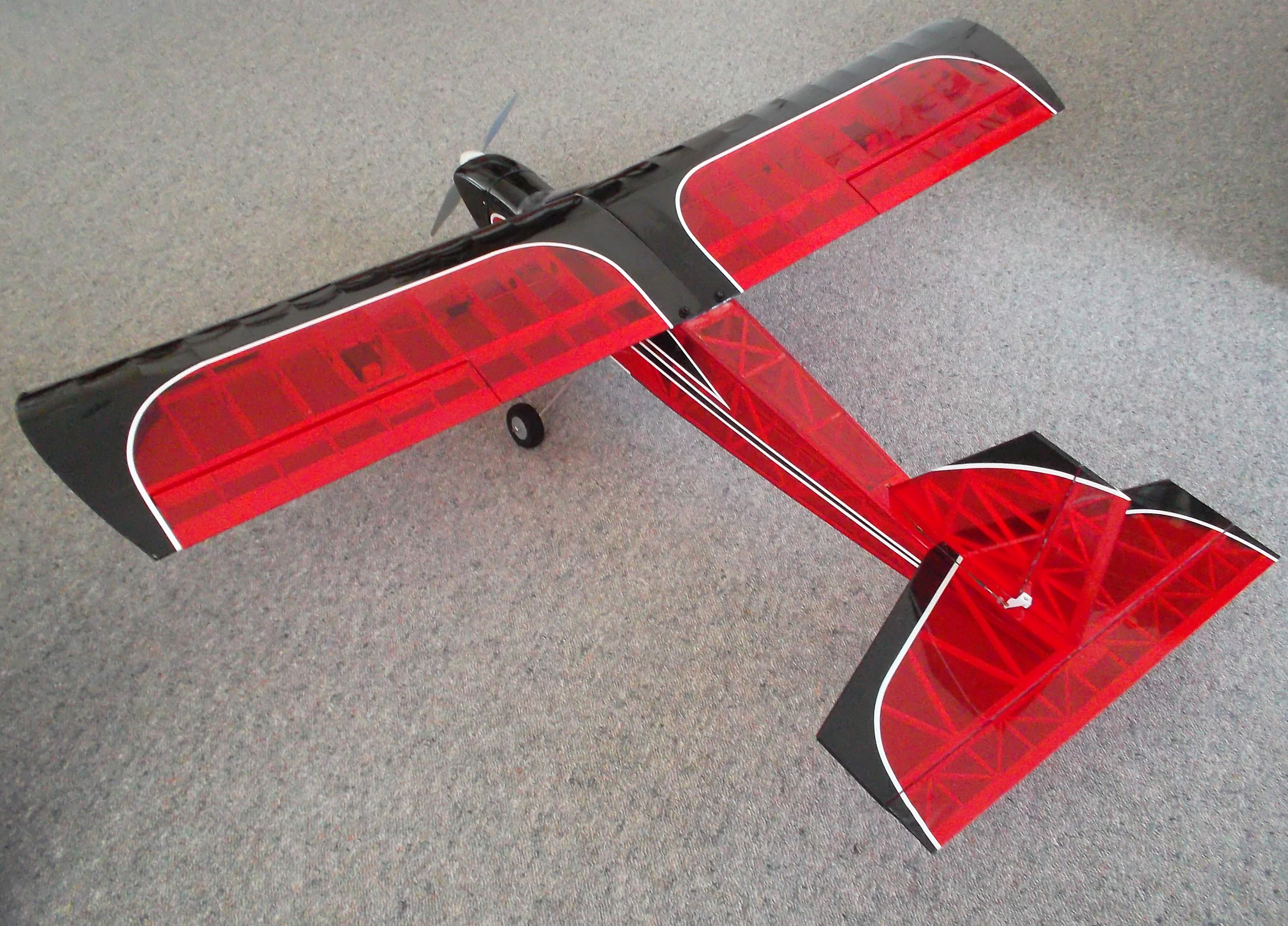
Seniorita RC model aircraft of balsa construction, with transparent heat-shrink covering revealing the balsa inner structure

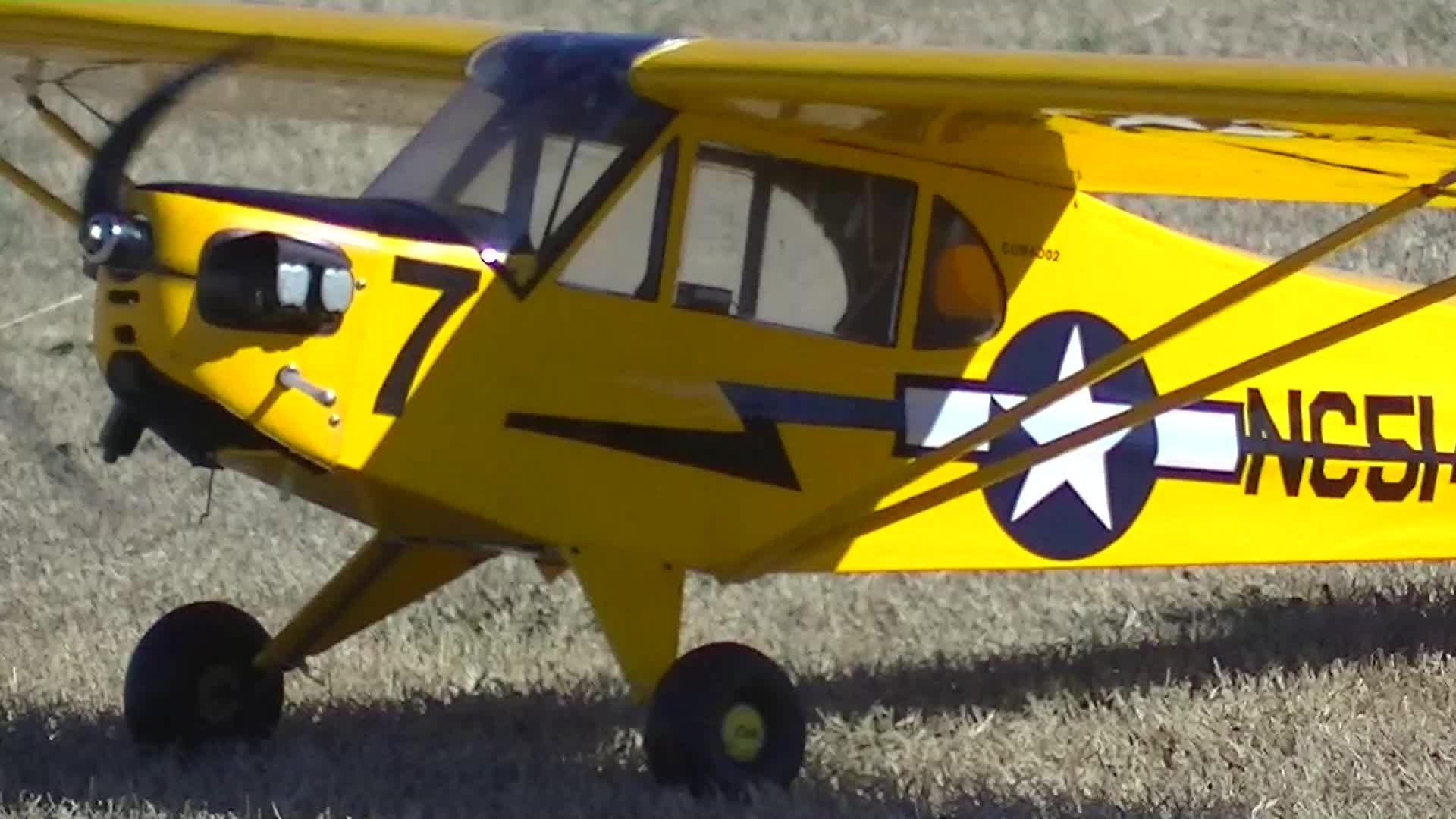
A large model J-3 Cub, scale RC models are often made of balsa and covered with lightweight heat-shrinkable polyester fabric covering for a more realistic appearance.

Wood kits come in many sizes and skill levels. The wood, typically balsa and light ply, may either be cut with a die-cut or laser. Laser cut kits have a much more precise construction and much tighter tolerances, but tend to cost more than die-cut kits.

Wood kits include the raw material needed to assemble the airframe, a construction manual, and full-size plans. Assembling a model from plans or a kit can be very labor-intensive. In order to complete the construction of a model, the builder typically spends many hours assembling the airframe, installing the engine and radio equipment, covering it, sometimes painting it, installing the control surfaces and pushrods, and adjusting the control surfaces travels. The kit does not include necessary tools, so they must be purchased separately. Care must be taken when building models from wood kits since construction flaws may affect the model's flying characteristics or even result in structural failure.

Smaller balsa kits will often come complete with the necessary parts for the primary purpose of non-flying modeling or rubber band flight. These kits will usually also come with conversion instructions to fly as glow (gas powered) or electric and can be flown free-flight or radio-controlled. Converting a kit requires additional and substitution parts to get it to fly properly such as the addition of servos, hinges, speed controls, control rods and better landing gear mechanisms and wheels.

Many small kits will come with a tissue paper covering that then gets covered with multiple layers of plane dope which coats and strengthens the fuselage and wings in a plastic-like covering. It has become more common to cover planes with heat-shrinking plastic films backed with heat-sensitive adhesive. These films are generally known as 'iron-on covering' since a hand-held iron allows the film to be attached to the frame; a higher temperature then causes the film to tighten. This plastic covering is more durable and makes for a quick repair. Other varieties of heat shrinkable coverings are also available, that have fibrous reinforcements within the plastic film, or are actual woven heat shrinkable fabrics.

It is common to leave landing gear off smaller planes (roughly 36" or smaller) in order to save on weight, drag and construction costs. The planes can then be launched by hand-launching, as with smaller free-flight models, and can then land in soft grass. Flute board or Coroplast can be used in place of balsa wood.

=== From plans or scratch ===
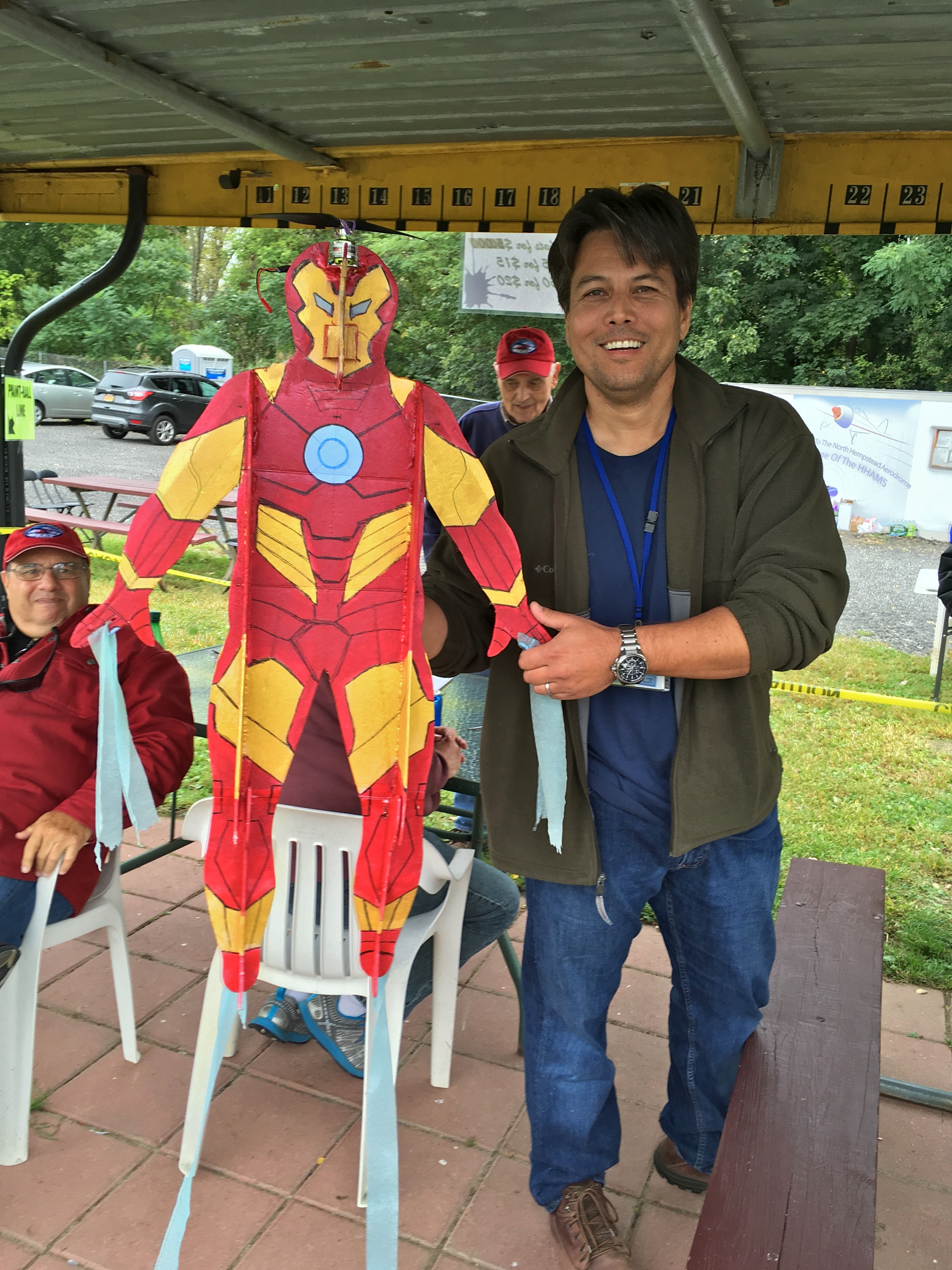
Custom-designed plane in the form of Iron Man

Planes can be built from published plans, often supplied as full-sized drawings with included instructions. Parts normally need to be cut out from sheet wood or foam using supplied templates. Once all of the parts have been made, the project builds up just like a wood kit. A model plane built from scratch ends up with more value because you created the project from the plans. There is more choice of plans and materials than with kits, and the latest and more specialized designs are usually not available in kit form. The plans can be scaled to any desired size with a computer or copy machine, usually with little or no loss in aerodynamic efficiency.

Hobbyists that have gained some experience in constructing and flying from kits and plans will often venture into building custom planes from scratch. This involves finding drawings of full-sized aircraft and scaling these down, or even designing the entire airframe from scratch. It requires a solid knowledge of aerodynamics and a plane's control surfaces. Plans can be drawn up on paper or using CAD software.

== Airframe materials ==
Several materials are commonly used for construction of the airframe of model radio-controlled aircraft.

The earliest model radio-controlled aircraft were constructed of wood covered with paper. Later, plastic film such as Monokote came to be widely used as a covering material. Wood has relatively low cost, high specific Young's modulus (stiffness per unit weight), good workability and strength, and can be assembled with adhesives of various types. Light-weight strong varieties such as balsa wood are preferred; basswood, pine and spruce are also used.

Carbon fiber, in rod or strip form, supplements wood in more recent models to reinforce the structure, and replaces it entirely in some cases (such as high performance turbine engine powered models and helicopters). The disadvantage of using carbon fiber is its high cost.

Expanded polystyrene and extruded polystyrene foam (Styrofoam) came to be used more recently for the construction of the entire airframe. Depron (the type of foam used for meat trays) blends rigidity with flexibility, allowing aircraft to absorb the stress of flying. Expanded polypropylene (EPP) is an extremely resilient variety of foam, often used in basic trainers, which take considerable abuse from beginners. Foam is used either in an injection mold to make a molded airframe or is cut out of sheet to make a built up airframe similar to some wood airframes. Airplanes of foam construction are frequently referred to as "Foamies".

Twinwall extruded polypropylene sheet has been used from the mid nineties. Commonly known as Correx in the United Kingdom, it is mentioned in the sections above. Currently the Mugi group based in West Yorkshire still promote and use this material in 2mm thickness sheet form. Very tough and lightweight it has only two disadvantages. Firstly it needs particular two-part contact glues. Secondly the material is difficult to paint due to low surface adhesion. Self-adhesive coloured tapes were the answer. Components are often laminated, taking advantage of differing flute directions for strength and forming. Models tend to exceed 900mm wingspan with carbon fibre tubing used for local reinforcement. The thickness used among modellers is from 2mm to 4 mm thickness. Models made out of this material are commonly known among modellers as "Spad" types (simple plastic aeroplane design).

PLA and ABS are used as material to print models using 3D printers.

== Plane characteristics ==
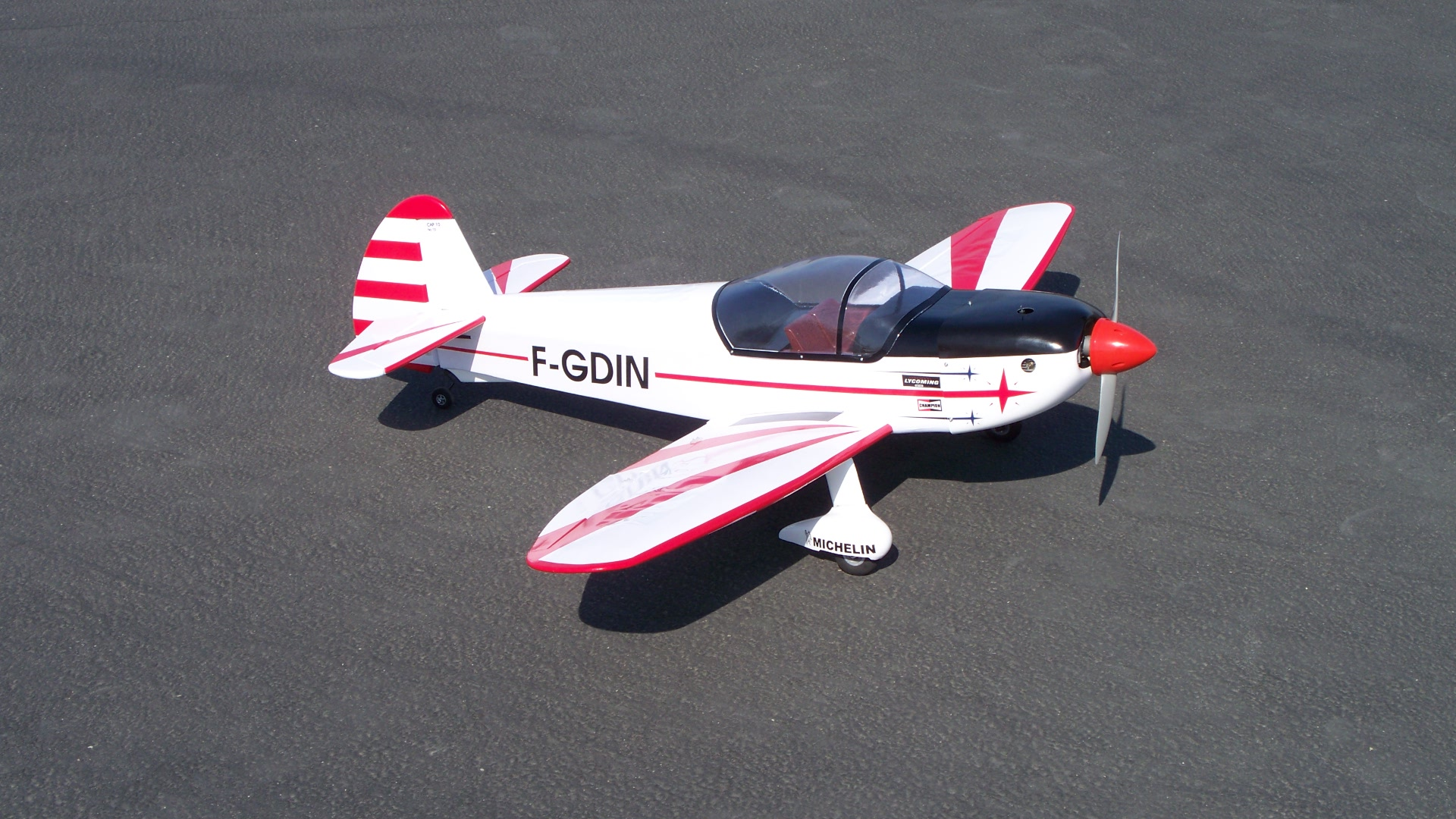
This .60 cubic inch/10cc glow-powered Vinh Quang Model Mudry CAP 10 is a fully aerobatic, low-wing, "sport scale" model plane with slight dihedral

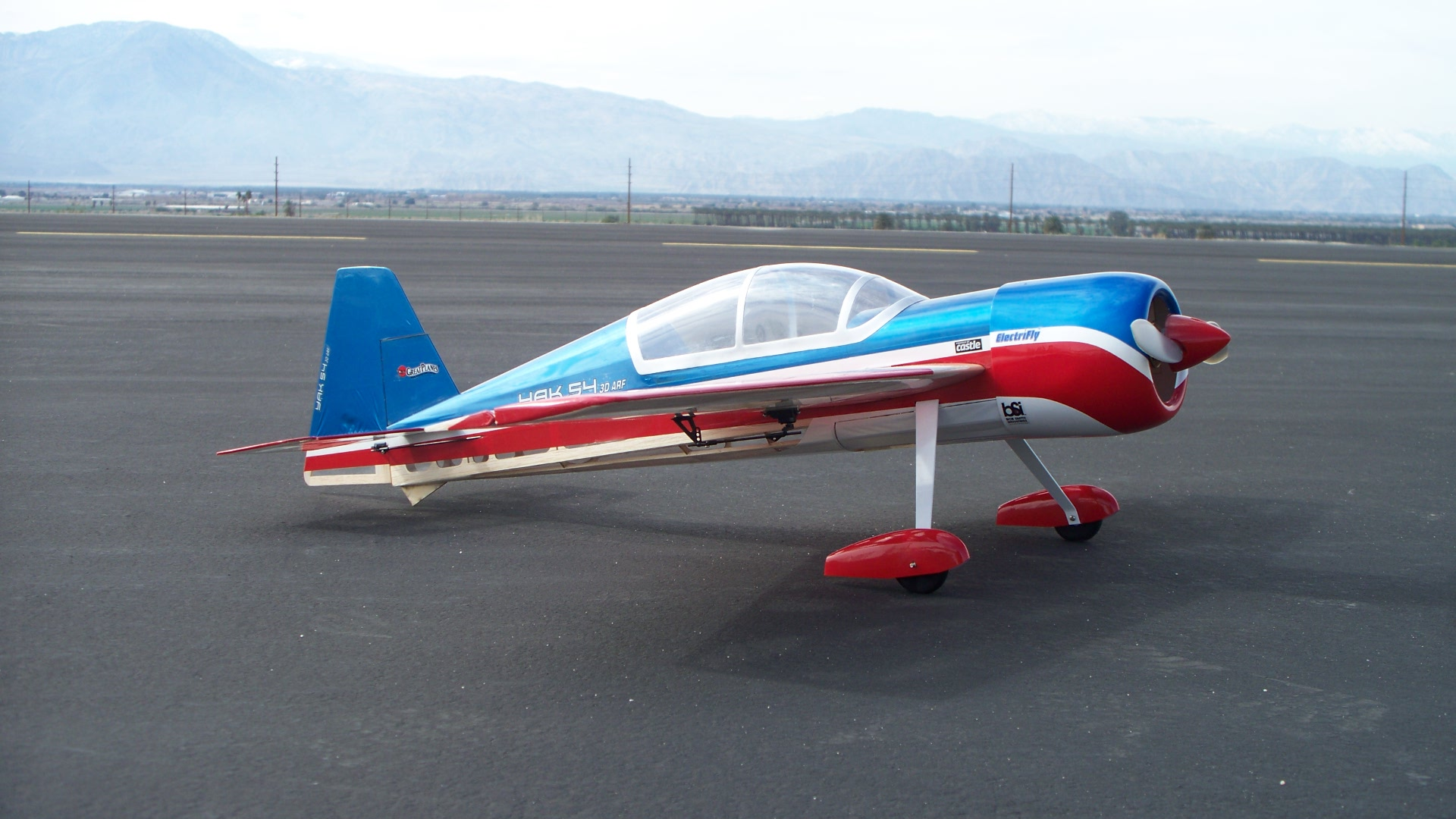
This Electrify/Great Planes model of a Yakovlev Yak-54 is an example of a high-performance, fully aerobatic mid-wing plane with no dihedral

=== Number of channels ===
The number of channels (technically, servo channels) a plane has is normally determined by the number of mechanical servos that have been installed, with a few exceptions, such as the aileron servos, where two servos can operate via a single channel using a Y harness (with one of the two servos rotating in the opposite direction). On smaller models, usually one servo per control surface (or set of surfaces in the case of ailerons or a split elevator surface) is sufficient. Generally, for a plane to be considered fully functional, it must have four channels (elevator, rudder, throttle, and ailerons).

==== Basic flight controls ====
A four-channel RC system gives the aeromodeler the same basic degree of control that a full-sized aircraft's primary flight controls do:

- Elevator (or horizontal stabilizer) – controls pitch (up and down).
- Rudder (or vertical stabilizer) – controls yaw (left and right).
- Throttle – controls engine rpm (or thrust for jets and ducted fans, or motor speed for electric RC Aircraft).
- Ailerons – control roll.

==== Extra flight control functionality ====
- Gear/retracts – controls retractable landing gear (usually in conjunction with gear doors).
- Flaps – Increase lift, but also increase drag. Using flaps, an aircraft can fly slower before stalling. Flaps are often used to steepen the landing approach angle and let the plane land at a slower touchdown speed (as well as letting the aircraft lift off at a slower takeoff speed). In both cases, flaps reduce the wear and tear on the airplane landing gear system, and enable an aircraft to use a shorter runway than would otherwise be required.
- Auxiliary control – Additional channels can control additional servos for propeller pitch (such as on 3D planes), or control surfaces such as slats, spoilers, flaps, spoilerons, flaperons, or elevons.
- Misc – bomb bay doors, lights, remote camera shutter can be assigned to extra channels. Additionally, if there is a flight assist or autopilot module on the craft (more common on the multi-rotor copters), features such as gyro-based stabilization, GPS location hold, height hold, return home, etc., can be controlled.

Three channels (controlling rudder or (rarely) ailerons, along with the elevator and throttle) are common on trainer aircraft. Four channel aircraft, as mentioned above, have controls for elevator, rudder, throttle, and ailerons.

For complex models and larger scale planes, multiple servos may be used on control surfaces. In such cases, more channels may be required to perform various functions such as deploying retractable landing gear, opening cargo doors, dropping bombs, operating remote cameras, lights, etc. Transmitters are available with as few as 2 channels to as many as 28 channels.

The right and left ailerons move in opposite directions. However, aileron control will often use two channels to enable mixing of other functions on the transmitter. For example, when they both move downward they can be used as flaps (flaperons), or when they both move upward, as spoilers (spoilerons). Delta winged aircraft designs commonly lack a separate elevator, its function being mixed with the ailerons and the combined control surfaces being known as elevons. V-tail mixing, needed for such full-scale aircraft designs as the Beechcraft Bonanza, when modeled as RC scale miniatures, is also done in a similar manner as elevons and flaperons.

Very small ready to fly RC indoor or indoor/outdoor toy aircraft often have two speed controllers and no servos, in order to cut production costs and lower sale price. There can be one motor for propulsion and one for steering or twin motors with the sum controlling the speed and the difference controlling the turn (yaw).

Some .049 glow models use two controls: elevator and rudder with no throttle control. The plane is flown until it runs out of fuel then lands in the fashion of a glider.

=== Turning ===
Turning is generally accomplished by rolling the plane left or right and applying the correct amount of up-elevator ("back pressure"). A three channel RC plane will typically have an elevator and a throttle control, and either an aileron or rudder control but not both. If the plane has ailerons, rolling the wings left or right is accomplished directly by them. If the plane has a rudder instead, it will be designed with a greater amount of dihedral effect, which is the tendency for the airplane to roll in response to sideslip angle created by the rudder deflection. Dihedral effect in model airplane design is usually increased by increasing the dihedral angle of the wing (V-bend in the wing). The rudder will yaw the plane so that it has a left or right sideslip, dihedral effect will then cause the plane to roll in the same direction. Many trainers, electric park fliers, and gliders use this technique.

A more complex four channel model can have both rudder and ailerons and is usually turned like a full-sized aircraft. That is, the ailerons are used primarily to directly roll the wings, and the rudder is used to "coordinate" (to keep the sideslip angle near-zero during the rolling motion). Sideslip otherwise builds up during an aileron-driven roll because of adverse yaw. Often, the transmitter is programmed to automatically apply rudder in proportion to aileron deflection to coordinate the roll.

When an airplane is in a small to moderate bank (roll angle) a small amount of 'back pressure' is required to maintain height. This is required because the lift vector, which would be pointing vertically upwards in level flight, is now angled inwards so some of the lift is turning the aircraft. A higher overall amount of lift is required so that the vertical component remains sufficient for a level turn.

Many radio-controlled aircraft, especially the toy class models, are designed to be flown with no movable control surfaces at all. Some model planes are designed this way because it is often cheaper and lighter to control the speed of a motor than it is to provide a moving control surface. Instead, "rudder" control (control over sideslip angle) is provided by differing thrust on two motors, one on each wing. Total power is controlled by increasing or decreasing the power on each motor equally. Usually, the planes only have only these two control channels (total throttle and differential throttle) with no elevator control. Turning a model with differential thrust is equivalent to and just as effective as turning a model with rudder. Lack of elevator control is sometimes problematic if the phugoid oscillation isn't well-damped leading to unmanageable "porpoising". See "Toy class RC" section.

=== V-tail systems ===
A V-Tail is a way of combining the control surfaces of the standard "+" configuration of rudder and elevator into a V shape. These ruddervators are controlled with two channels and mechanical or electronic mixing. An important part of the V-Tail configuration is the exact angle of the two surfaces relative to each other and the wing, otherwise the ratio of elevator and rudder outputs will be incorrect.

The mixing works as follows: When receiving rudder input, the two servos work together, moving both control surfaces to the left or right, inducing yaw. On elevator input, the servos work opposite, one surface moves to the "left" and the other to the "right" which gives the effect of both moving up and down, causing pitch changes in the aircraft.

V-Tails are very popular in Europe, especially for gliders. In the US, the T-Tail is more common. V-Tails have the advantage of being lighter and creating less drag. They also are less likely to break at landing or take-off due to the tail striking something on the ground like an ant mound or a rock.

== Powerplants ==
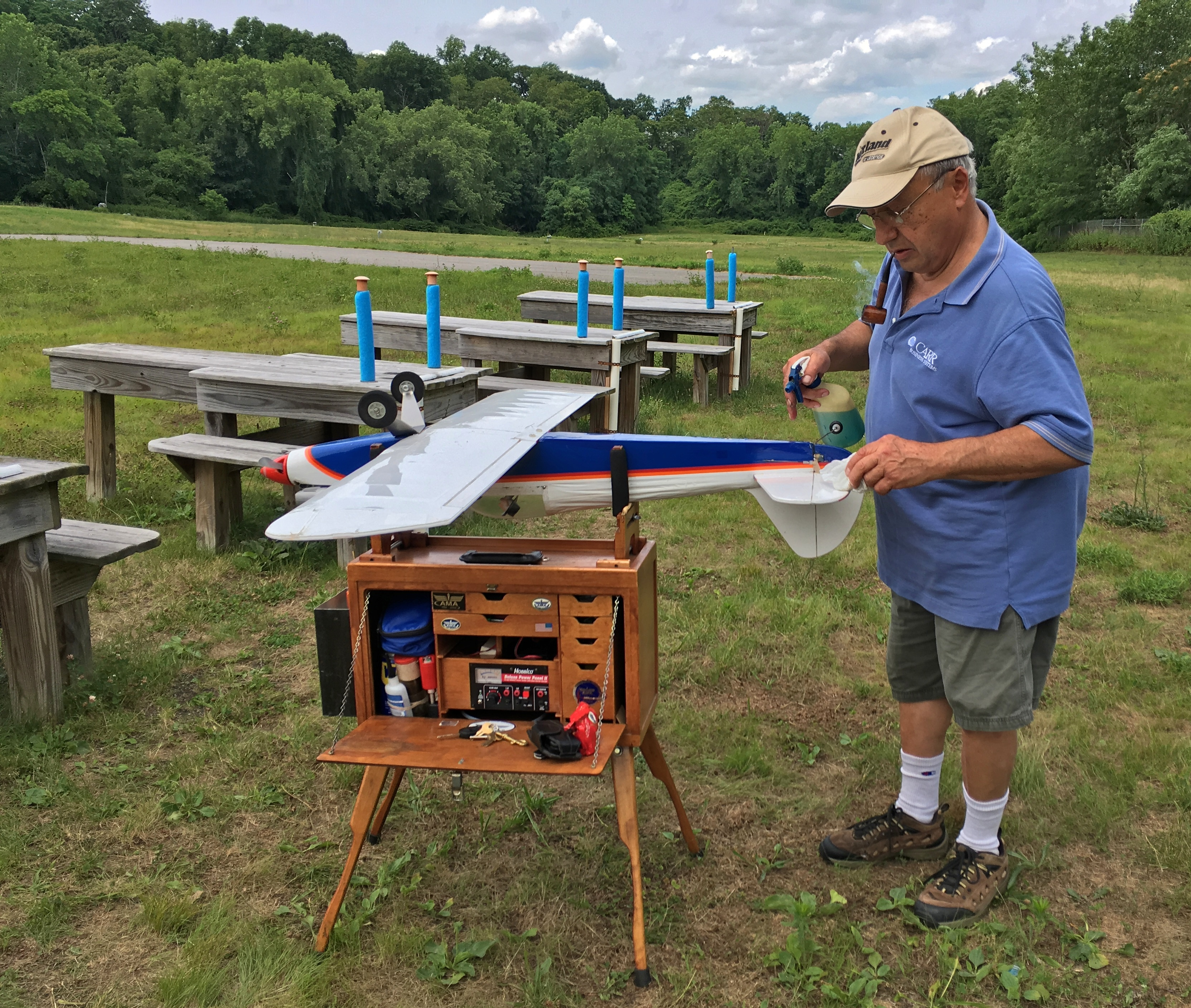
Nitro-powered plane being wiped down after a flight

Most planes need a powerplant to drive them, the exception being gliders. The most popular types for radio-controlled aircraft are internal combustion engines, electric motors, jet engines, and rocket engines. Three types of internal combustion engines are available being small 2 and 4 stroke engines. Glowplug engines use methanol and oil as fuel, compressive ignition ('diesel') burn paraffin with ether as an ignition agent. Larger engines can be glowplug but increasingly common gasoline is the fuel of choice. These engines are spark ignited.

In recent years electric powered models have increased in popularity due to the reducing cost and weight of components and improvements in technology, especially lithium polymer (LiPo) batteries and the choice of brushed motors and brushless motors. Electric systems are quieter and as they do not require fuel/exhaust, are cleaner. The advantage of electric power is the ease of starting the motor as compared to the starting of engines; electric motors that are comparable to engines are cheaper. Any form of lithium-chemistry battery cell technology packs have to be charged with "smart" chargers that have connections to every electrical connection in the pack to "balance-charge" the cells in the pack, and even with proper use of such chargers lithium-polymer battery packs can have the serious risk of fire or explosion, which has led to the increasing acceptance of cobalt-free, lithium iron phosphate battery technology in their place as a much more rugged and durable lithium-chemistry power source.

== Transmitting and Receiving Frequencies ==
=== Frequency ===
A transmitter and receiver of a radio control aircraft must both be on the same frequency so the aircraft can be controlled in flight. Traditionally, this transmitting and receiving frequency were referred to as a channel (technically, a frequency channel). This is not the same as number of servo channels that a plane can have, and can be confusing, as both are casually referred to as channels. It is less common now for radio control pilots to refer to frequency channels, as modern computer receivers in the gigahertz bands are equipped with synthesiser technology and are 'locked' to the computer transmitter being used.

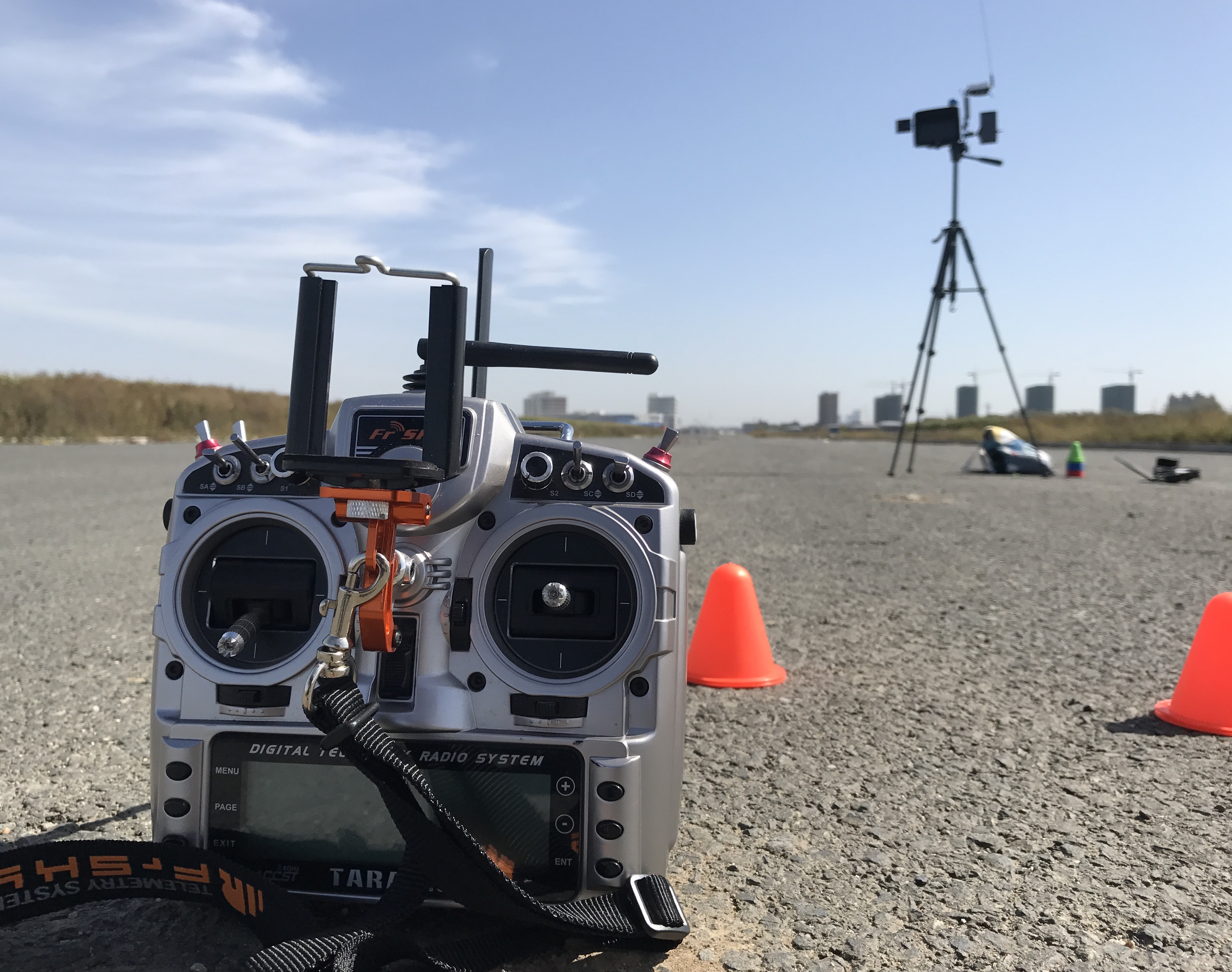
X9D RC Transmitter & Runway

==== Reserved frequencies ====
Many countries reserve specific frequency bands (ranges) for radio-control use. Due to the longer range and potentially worse consequences of radio interference, model aircraft have exclusive use of their own frequency allocation in some countries.

===== USA and Canada reserved VHF frequency bands =====
- 72 MHz: aircraft only (France also uses US/Canada channels 21 through 35).
- 75 MHz: surface vehicles.
- 53 MHz: all vehicles, only for older equipment on 100 kHz spacing, with the operator holding a valid amateur radio (FCC in the USA) license. The 53 MHz band began to become vulnerable to amateur radio repeater stations operating on the 53 MHz area of the 6-meter band during the early 1980s. The 53 MHz bands can still be used with relative safety for ground-based (cars, boats/ships) powered modeling activities.
- 50.8 to 51 MHz: on the 6-meter band for all vehicles at 20 kHz spacing, with the operator holding a valid amateur radio (FCC in the USA) license. Added in the 1980s as the amateur radio repeater interference problem on the earlier 53 MHz bands in the United States began to manifest itself.
- 27 MHz: first band opened for RC use in the United States and shared with CB radio users: as with 53 MHz for Hams, nowadays preferable for use on ground-based RC models only — also used for older RC toys before 1991.

===== USA and Canada reserved UHF frequency bands =====
- 2.400-2.485 GHz: 13-cm UHF Spread Spectrum band for general use (amateur radio license holders have 2.39-2.45 GHz licensed for their general use in the USA) and using both frequency-hopping spread spectrum and direct-sequence spread spectrum RF technology to maximize the number of available frequencies on this band, especially at organized events in North America.

US frequency chart available at, Canadian frequency chart available at

===== European reserved VHF & UHF frequency bands =====
- 35 MHz: aircraft only.
- 40 MHz: surface vehicles or aircraft.
- 27 MHz: general use, toys, citizens band radio.
- 2.4 GHz 13-cm UHF band spread spectrum: surface vehicles, boats and aircraft.

Within the 35 MHz range, there are designated A and B bands. Some European countries allow use only in the A band, whereas others allow use in both bands.

===== United Kingdom reserved frequency bands =====
- 458.5–459.5 MHz: low-UHF band for surface vehicles or aircraft. (Non-Ham-frequencies – 70-cm amateur band in the UK covers 430-440 MHz)

===== Singapore reserved frequency bands =====
- 72 MHz: aircraft only
- 2.4 GHz: 13-cm UHF band aircraft only

===== China reserved frequency bands =====
- 1.4 GHz: general use
- 2.4 GHz: 13-cm UHF band general use
- 5.8 GHz: general use
- 433 MHz: for amateur radio licensees only

===== Australian reserved frequency bands =====
- 36 MHz: aircraft and water-craft (odd channels for aircraft only)
- 29 MHz: general use
- 27 MHz: light electric aircraft, general use
- 2.400-2.485 GHz: 13-cm UHF band Spread Spectrum band for general use (ACMA references available at )

===== New Zealand reserved frequency bands =====
- 35 MHz: aircraft only
- 40 MHz: aircraft only
- 27 MHz: general use
- 29 MHz: general use
- 36 MHz: general use
- 72 MHz: general use (US 72 MHz "even-numbered" channels 12 through 56, at 40 kHz spacing)
- 2.400-2.4835 GHz: 13-cm UHF band

The frequencies are permitted under legislation, provided equipment meets the appropriate standards, bears the New Zealand supplier's Supplier Code Number and has the correct compliance documentation.

Detailed information, including cautions for transmitting on some of the 'general use' frequencies, can be found on the NZMAA website.

===== Amateur radio license reserved frequency bands =====
- 50 and 53 MHz in the US and Canada (American amateurs allowed up to one watt [30 dBm] of output power)
- 433–434 MHz Formerly used low-UHF band in Germany until the end of 2008, but is still permitted in Switzerland; and is also usable within both the US and Canada, most often implemented nowadays in North America with spread spectrum RF hardware (as on 2.4 GHz).

=== Channels and frequency control ===
Traditionally (since 1967) most RC aircraft in the United States utilized a 72 MHz frequency band for communication – six of these were actually on the 72 MHz band at 80 kHz separation from each other, with one additional isolated frequency at 75.640 MHz. These remained legal to use until the 1983 FCC reform that introduced "narrowband" RC frequencies – at 40 kHz separation from 1983 to 1991, and finally at 20 kHz separation from 1991 onwards, to the present day with fifty frequencies on 72 MHz solely for flying models. The 75 MHz band became usable only for ground-based RC modeling (cars, boats, etc.) in the same timeframe, with the transition also occurring through to 1991, having 30 frequencies available at the same 20 kHz channel separation. Canadian modelers today flying on VHF-band RC gear use the same 72 and 75 MHz frequencies as American hobbyists do, for the same types of models.

The transmitter radio broadcasts using AM or FM using PPM or PCM. Each aircraft needs a way to determine which transmitter to receive communications from, so a specific channel within the frequency band is used for each aircraft (except for 2.4 GHz band, and amateur radio-only 70 cm systems; which use spread spectrum modulation, described below).

Most radio control systems – traditionally on low-VHF-band frequencies before the 21st century – have traditionally used crystals to set the operating channel in the receiver and transmitter. It is important that each aircraft uses a different channel, otherwise interference could result. For example, if a person is flying an aircraft on channel 35 (used for 72.490 MHz in North America), and someone else turns their radio on the same channel, the aircraft's control will be compromised and the result is almost always a crash. Since multiple RC frequency use began in the RC hobbies in the mid-20th century, so-called "frequency pins" have been used to ensure that only one modeler was using a particular frequency at any one time, for "traditional" style, crystal-controlled RC system use. The common, spring-loaded two-piece wood clothespin – marked in some manner with text and/or color-coding for the designated frequency it references, usually with an added piece of thin plywood or plastic on the clothespin to place the text or color-code upon for greater visibility – is the usual basis for these. Usually, the model club itself will possess some sort of "transmitter impound" facility at their modeling site for secure storage of the modelers' transmitters when not in active use while visiting the facility, and usually provides some sort of fixed "frequency control board" nearby to the impound area. The "frequency control board" at a modeling club's facility is used in one of two ways: either the club provides sets of frequency pins itself, already clipped onto the control board for the modeler to take the appropriate pin for their modeling activity (clipped onto their transmitter's antenna, in a so-called "subtractive" method) while their transmitter is in use away from the impound area, or with the modeler required to provide them for their own transmitter(s), and places them on a club facility's existing frequency board (the "additive" method) whenever they are using their RC transmitter.

A modern computer radio transmitter and receiver can be equipped with synthesizer technology, using a phase-locked loop (PLL), with the advantage of giving the pilot the opportunity to select any of the available channels with no need of changing a crystal. This is very popular in flying clubs where a lot of pilots have to share a limited number of channels. Latest receivers now available use synthesiser technology and are 'locked' to the transmitter being used. Dual-conversion radio receivers have been in existence since the 1980s and commonly in use since that time, which add security for the proper reception of the control signal, and can offer the advantage of a built-in 'failsafe' mode. Using synthesised receivers saves on crystal costs and enables full use of the VHF bandwidth available, for example the 35 MHz band.

Newer Transmitters use spread spectrum technology in the 2.4 GHz, upper-UHF frequency band for communication. Spread spectrum technology allows many pilots to transmit in the same band (2.4 GHz) in proximity to each other with little fear of conflicts. Receivers in this band are virtually immune to most sources of electrical interference. Amateur radio licensees in the United States also have general use of an overlapping band in this same area, which exists from 2.39 to 2.45 GHz, with newer aftermarket transmitter RF module/receiver combinations on the 70 cm band also offering user-programmable, spread-spectrum versatility of varying degrees for Ham RC modelers in both the US and Canada, only as secondary users without "exclusive" use provisions.

== Military usage ==
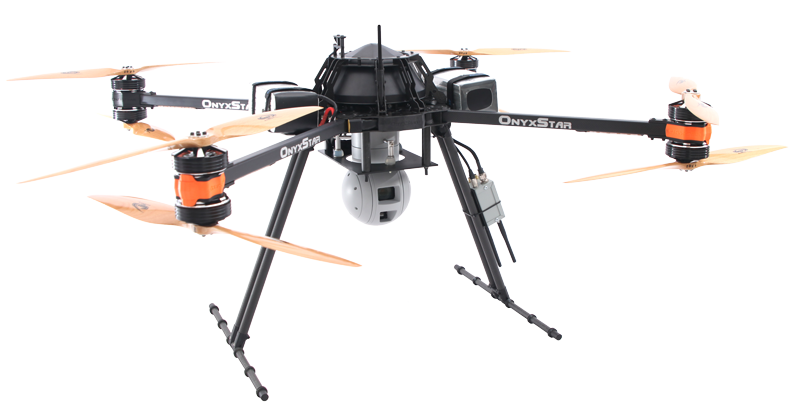
Drone OnyxStar FOX-C8-XT Observer from AltiGator with HD optical zoom 30x and Infrared camera

Radio-controlled aircraft are also used for military purposes, with their primary task being intelligence-gathering reconnaissance. An Unmanned Aerial Vehicle (UAV), also known as a drone, is usually not designed to contain a human pilot. Remotely controlled target drone aircraft were used to train gun crews.

== Regulations on use ==
Various countries have regulations and restrictions on model aircraft operations, even for non-commercial purposes, typically imposed by the national civil aviation authority.

=== United States ===
In the United States, radio-controlled model aircraft and unmanned aircraft generally may be subject to regulation by the following entities:

==== Federal Aviation Administration ====
The legal status of radio-controlled model aircraft under federal aviation law is currently unclear. In March 2014 in the case Huerta v. Pirker, an administrative law judge with the National Transportation Safety Board (NTSB) dismissed an FAA enforcement action against a model aircraft operator under 14 CFR 91.13 (prohibiting careless and reckless operation of an aircraft), ruling that model aircraft are not legally classified as "aircraft" and that they are not subject to any current Federal Aviation Regulations (FARs). This decision was appealed to the full NTSB. In November 2014 the NTSB issued a ruling reversing the administrative law judge's decision and holding that model aircraft are legally considered "aircraft" at least for the purposes of 14 CFR 91.13, and remanded the case to the administrative judge to determine whether Pirker's actions constituted reckless operation. It remains unclear what other provisions of the Federal Aviation Regulations are applicable to model aircraft, but it is likely that every regulation applicable to "aircraft" generally would potentially apply under this standard.

In June 2014 the Federal Aviation Administration (FAA) issued a notice of interpretation regarding the Special Rule for Model Aircraft in Section 336 of the FAA Modernization and Reform Act passed by Congress in February 2012, which exempted model aircraft meeting certain criteria from future FAA rulemaking. In this document, the FAA stated its position that, "Model aircraft that do not meet these statutory requirements are nonetheless unmanned aircraft, and as such, are subject to all existing FAA regulations, as well as future rulemaking action, and the FAA intends to apply its regulations to such unmanned aircraft." The notice of interpretation further stated that even model aircraft that do qualify for the Sec. 336 exemption are legally considered aircraft, and the FAA has authority to pursue enforcement actions against model aircraft operators who do not comply with certain provisions of Part 91 of the Federal Aviation Regulations, including the prohibition against careless and reckless operation of an aircraft in 14 CFR 91.13 and 14 CFR 91.113, which requires that "vigilance shall be maintained by each person operating an aircraft so as to see and avoid other aircraft." Because the FAA has not yet sought to enforce this regulation against unmanned aircraft operators, whether it applies to model aircraft and what actions are necessary for compliance are currently unknown. FAA pilot registration for both camera-bearing "small unmanned aircraft system" (sUAS) multirotor "drones" and recreationally-flown traditional radio-controlled aircraft was reinstated by the FAA as part of the National Defense Authorization Act for Fiscal Year 2018, requiring RC aeromodelers to register with the FAA for a $5.00 fee for a three-year registration period: the modeler is assigned a ten-character alphanumeric personal FAA registration code to be placed on their models' exterior surfaces no later than February 25, 2019 as part of the registration requirements, to be placed on the model on any "exterior-viewable" part of the model that requires nothing to be opened – the modeler's registration code is personal for their use, and any number of model aircraft that they own and operate can bear the same registration code.

==== Federal Communications Commission ====
Licensed amateur radio operators in the United States are expressly allowed to use amateur radio frequencies for telecommand of model aircraft, per FCC Part 97's rule 97.215. However, the Federal Communications Commission prohibits using amateur radio frequencies for commercial activity (generally any form of economic gain or for-profit activity, Part 97's rule 97.113). The FCC has not yet addressed the issue of creating designated command and control frequencies for commercial unmanned aircraft, and many civilian unmanned aircraft continue to use amateur radio frequencies, even when used for commercial purposes. Though it has not so far pursued any enforcement actions related to use of amateur radio frequencies for commercial unmanned aircraft (with the FCC, as early as 1997, commencing the authorization of specific "industrial/business" frequency bands, potentially usable for such needs), the FCC has the authority to levy civil forfeitures and fines into the tens of thousands of dollars for violations of its regulations. There is no similar "displayed registration code" requirement as yet from the FCC, to that of the FAA as mentioned above (the FAA's "pilot registration code" must be on the model already), for FCC-licensed amateur radio operators flying RC aircraft under part 97.215. Since mid-July 2000, FCC Amateur Radio Service licensees have already been assigned a ten-digit "FCC registration number" or "FRN" directly linked to their callsign which could additionally be placed on their models along with any already-assigned FAA registration code, if desired. The July 2000 announcement of the "FRN" code system was partly worded: ..."The use of the registration number is voluntary, although the Commission will consider making it mandatory in the future.", leaving its use open for any future FCC-administered Amateur Radio Service needs in the United States.

==== National Park Service ====
Under a 2014 edict from the National Park Service, model aircraft and other unmanned aircraft operations are prohibited on all land administered by the National Park Service, with some exceptions for preexisting model aircraft fields that were established prior to the adoption of this rule. Because the National Park Service does not have jurisdiction over airspace, which is exclusively governed by the FAA, this rule only applies to unmanned aircraft flown from National Park Service land. It does not apply to overflight of National Park Service land by unmanned aircraft operated elsewhere.

==== State and Local Governments ====
There are a wide variety of state and local laws and ordinances affecting model aircraft. Many state and local governments restrict or prohibit model aircraft from being flown at local parks. Some state laws purport to restrict or prohibit aerial photography using unmanned aircraft, though such laws would likely be found invalid if challenged in court due to federal preemption, as the FAA has exclusive regulatory jurisdiction over all aircraft and airspace from the surface up. Any laws restricting aerial photography of areas where no reasonable expectation of privacy exists would also likely be vulnerable to challenges under the First Amendment to the United States Constitution.

==== Academy of Model Aeronautics ====
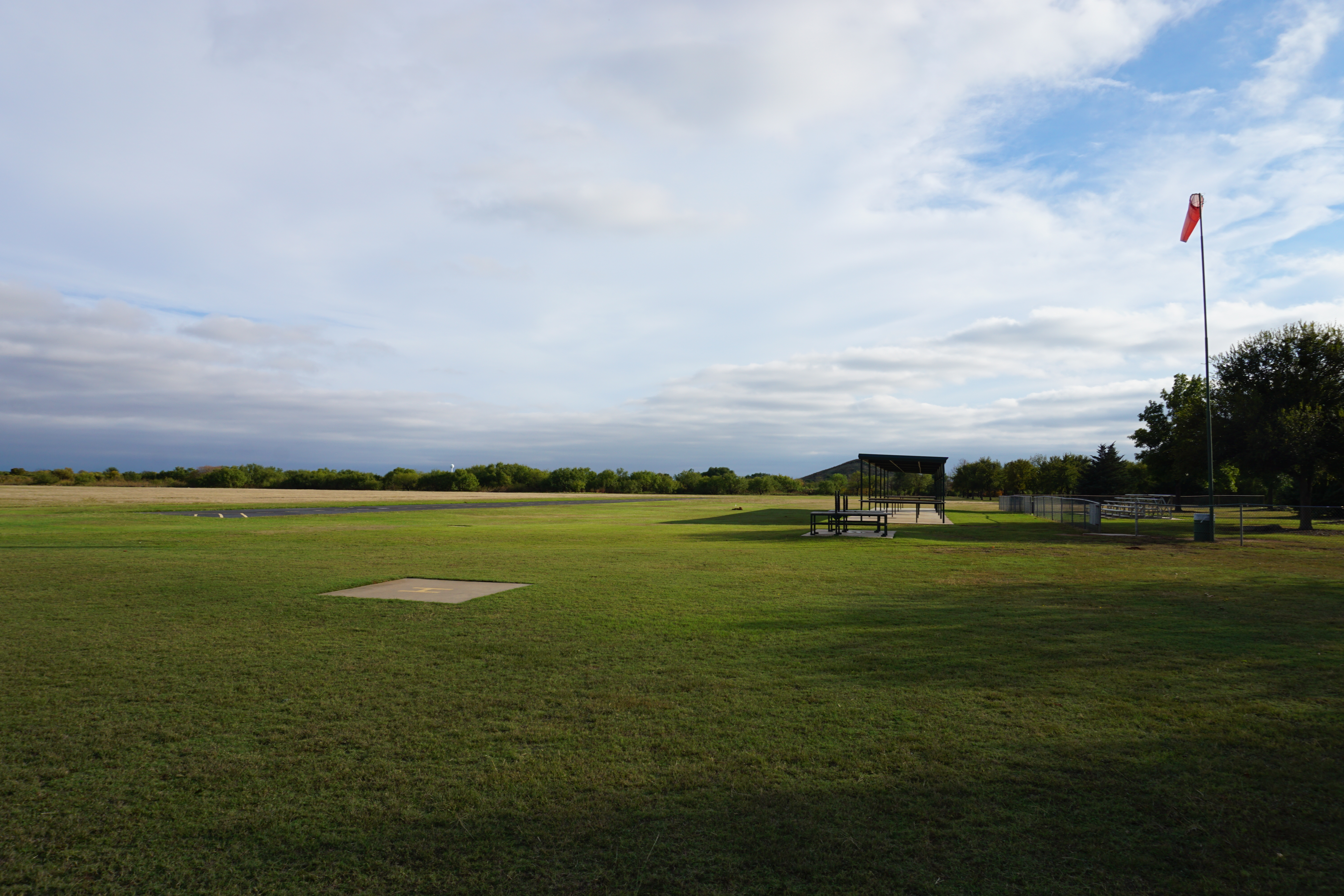
The radio-controlled flying field at Lake Wichita Park in Wichita Falls, Texas

The Academy of Model Aeronautics' (AMA) Safety Code governs model aircraft operations at all model aircraft clubs and flying fields affiliated with the organization, which includes the majority of designated model aircraft flying fields in the United States.

=== Australia ===
In Australia the operation of model aircraft is subject to laws and regulations regarding radio spectrum use which is enforced by the ACMA (Australian Communications and Media Authority) and the use of airspace as enforced by CASA (Civil Aviation Safety Authority).

All unmanned aeronautical activities in Australia are ruled by CASR (Civil Aviation Safety Regulations) Part 101 which includes sections for UAV's and model aircraft among other operations. It is currently under review and new regulations specifically relating to UAV's and model aircraft are anticipated.

- Any commercial use (i.e. any form of payment or benefit) of an unmanned aircraft results in the operations falling under the Unmanned Aerial Vehicle (UAV) Operations Section, CASR 101–1. This section requires formal licensing, training and documentation procedures to be approved and followed. These requirements will typically require an outlay in the order of thousands of dollars which places commercial operations beyond the reach of most hobbyists. This is one area currently under review by CASA with initial reports indicating a potential option of simpler registration for light-weight UAV's without requiring formal certification.
- Non-commercial use is governed by section 101-3 which includes requirements that:
  - No commercial benefit is to be obtained from operating the model – to be flown only for sport or recreational purposes
  - Maximum weight of 150 kg (models over 25 kg must be operated within a club setting under additional conditions)
  - Models under 100 grams are exempt from regulation
  - Only to be flown in daylight unless under written procedures of an authorised organisation (such as the MAAA)
  - The model must remain within continuous direct sight of the operator
  - When within 3 nautical miles of an aerodrome or when within controlled airspace, flight is limited to 400 ft above ground level

=== India ===
There are certain conditions for using the frequency band in which the aircraft will operate. The operator is required to be eligible for that grade. The only requirement in that is the operator's name will be scripted. For self built aircraft a license is required.

== See also ==
- 3D Aerobatics
- Academy of Model Aeronautics
- British Model Flying Association
- Bruce Simpson who used RC flight control systems in the construction of a homemade cruise missile
- Discus Launch Glider
- Hotliner
- International Miniature Aerobatic Club
- List of radio-controlled model aircraft kit manufacturers
- Model Aeronautics Association of Canada
- Radio-controlled model
- RC flight simulator
