= Twinwall plastic =

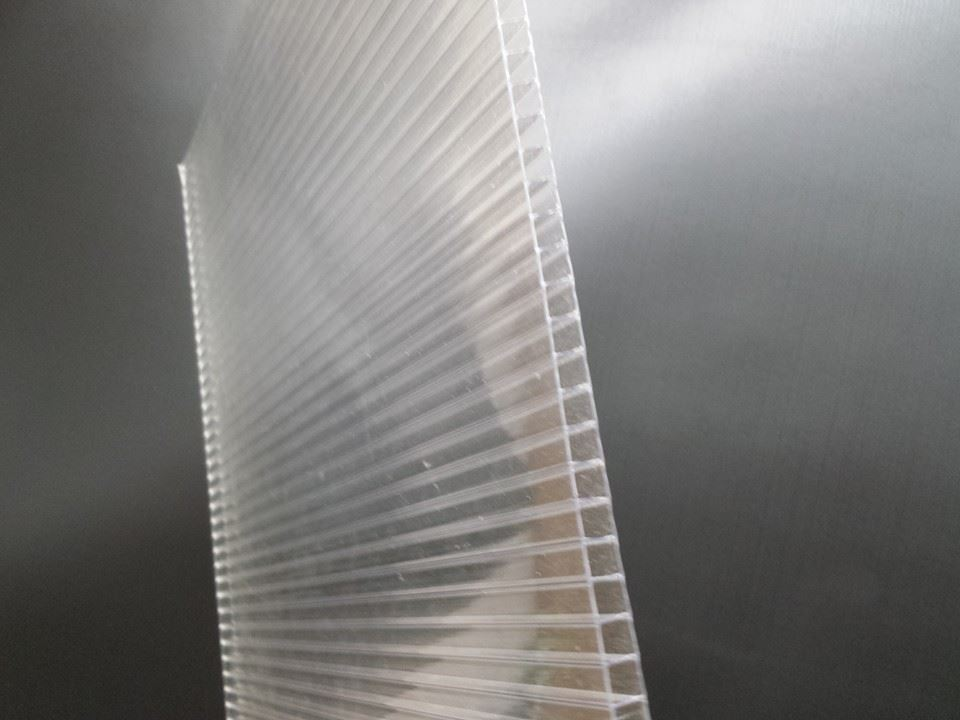
6mm Twinwall Polycarbonate Sheet

Twin-wall plastic, specifically twin-wall polycarbonate, is an extruded multi-wall polymer product created for applications where its strength, thermally insulative properties, and moderate cost are ideal. Polycarbonate, which is most commonly formed through the reaction of Bisphenol A and Carbonyl Chloride, is an extremely versatile material. It is significantly lighter than glass, while managing to be stronger, more flexible, and more impact resistant. Twin-wall polycarbonate is used most commonly for green houses, where it can support itself in a structurally sound configuration, limit the amount of UV light due to its nominal translucence, and can withstand the rigors of daily abuse in an outdoor environment. The stagnant air in the cellular space between sheets provides insulation, and additional cell layers can be extruded to enhance insulative properties at the cost of light transmission.

Similar sheets of polypropylene, PET, and HDPE are usually called corrugated plastic.

== Structure ==
Twinwall plastic most commonly refers to two exterior plastic sheets that are connected with a plastic support layer to create parallel channels. This design adds both impact toughness and the ability to support weight. Twinwall plastic may also be used to describe a pipe that has a smooth interior with exterior air filled ridges. The outside ridges add durability to the piping while the smooth interior allows the desired contents to flow efficiently. The hollow ribs also create insulation for the piping.

Twinwall plastic can refer to several different extruded polymers including:

=== Polycarbonate ===
Structure
Polycarbonates received their name because they are polymers containing carbonate groups (–O–(C=O)–O–). Most polycarbonates of commercial interest are derived from rigid monomers. A balance of useful features including temperature resistance, impact resistance and optical properties position polycarbonates between commodity plastics and engineering plastics.

Although polycarbonate does not stand up to ultraviolet radiation for extended periods of time, products such as Makroclear coextrude a layer of UV-resistant polycarbonate on top of the standalone polycarbonate product. This layer significantly reduces UV light damage, increasing the service life of the material by prolonging its translucence and toughness.

=== Polypropylene ===
Structure
Most commercial polypropylene is isotactic and has an intermediate level of crystallinity between that of low-density polyethylene (LDPE) and high-density polyethylene (HDPE). Polypropylene is normally tough and flexible, especially when copolymerized with ethylene. This allows polypropylene to be used as an engineering plastic, competing with materials such as acrylonitrile butadiene styrene (ABS). Polypropylene is reasonably economical, and can be made translucent when uncolored but is not as readily made transparent as polystyrene, acrylic, or certain other plastics. It is often opaque or colored using pigments. Polypropylene has good resistance to fatigue.

Polypropylene is liable to chain degradation from exposure to heat and UV radiation such as that present in sunlight. Oxidation usually occurs at the tertiary carbon atom present in every repeat unit. A free radical is formed here, and then reacts further with oxygen, followed by chain scission to yield aldehydes and carboxylic acids. In external applications, it shows up as a network of fine cracks and crazes that become deeper and more severe with time of exposure. For external applications, UV-absorbing additives must be used. Carbon black also provides some protection from UV attack. The polymer can also be oxidized at high temperatures, a common problem during molding operations. Anti-oxidants are normally added to prevent polymer degradation.

=== Polyethylene Terephthalate (PET) ===
Structure
PET in its natural state is a colorless, semi-crystalline resin. Based on how it is processed, PET can be semi-rigid to rigid, and it is very lightweight. It makes a good gas and fair moisture barrier, as well as a good barrier to alcohol (requires additional "barrier" treatment) and solvents. It is strong and impact-resistant. PET becomes white when exposed to chloroform and also certain other chemicals such as toluene.

About 60% crystallization is the upper limit for commercial products, with the exception of polyester fibers. Clear products can be produced by rapidly cooling molten polymer below T_{g} glass transition temperature to form an amorphous solid. Like glass, amorphous PET forms when its molecules are not given enough time to arrange themselves in an orderly, crystalline fashion as the melt is cooled. At room temperature the molecules are frozen in place, but, if enough heat energy is put back into them by heating above T_{g}, they begin to move again, allowing crystals to nucleate and grow. This procedure is known as solid-state crystallization.

=== High-Density-Polyethylene (HDPE) ===
Structure
Polyethylene is a thermoplastic polymer consisting of long hydrocarbon chains. Depending on the crystallinity and molecular weight, a melting point and glass transition may or may not be observable. The temperature at which these occur varies strongly with the type of polyethylene. For common commercial grades of medium- and high-density polyethylene the melting point is typically in the range 120 to 180 °C (248 to 356 °F). The melting point for average, commercial, low-density polyethylene is typically 105 to 115 °C (221 to 239 °F).

Most LDPE, MDPE and HDPE grades have excellent chemical resistance, meaning that it is not attacked by strong acids or strong bases. It is also resistant to gentle oxidants and reducing agents. Polyethylene burns slowly with a blue flame having a yellow tip and gives off an odour of paraffin. The material continues burning on removal of the flame source and produces a drip. Crystalline samples do not dissolve at room temperature. Polyethylene (other than cross-linked polyethylene) usually can be dissolved at elevated temperatures in aromatic hydrocarbons such as toluene or xylene, or in chlorinated solvents such as trichloroethane or trichlorobenzene.

== Properties ==
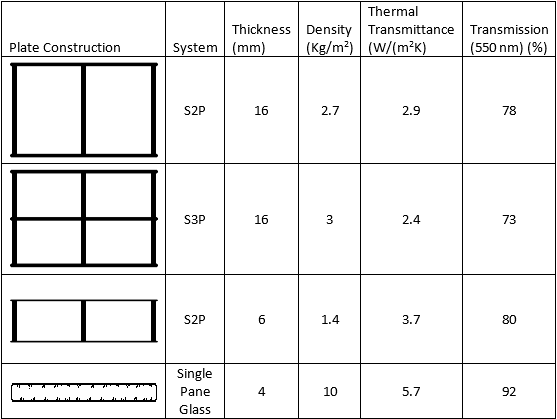
Comparison of various physical properties of single and multi-wall materials

Twinwall Polycarbonate exhibits high degree of durability and toughness. Although single layer polycarbonate sheeting is more flexible than polycarbonate in twinwall configuration, it still retains significant advantages over alternative materials, including glass. A typical 6mm sheet has a density of 0.72 g/cm^2 and a thermal insulation R value of 0.3 m^2 °C/W, while allowing 80% of visible light pass through. These attributes, coupled with a service temperature range in excess of 120 °C (-51 °C to 71 °C), makes polycarbonate the ideal material for twinwall application.

In addition to the preferential thermal properties of polycarbonate, its ability to be recycled at the end of its service life is also highly beneficial. Polycarbonate is thermoplastic, meaning that it can be melted after polymerization. This is what allows it to be extruded, which decreases twinwall production cost.

The warm, stagnant air present within the twinwall cells can present problems. Algae and bacterial growth can be incubated inside these cells, resulting in a decrease in optical clarity, reducing the efficiency of the greenhouse. Cleaning these growths can be difficult because of the inability to use many solvents with polymer-based glazing. Solvents disrupt the intermolecular forces present in thermoplastics, irreparably destroying many of their physical properties in the process, including their ductility and translucence. Polymers, especially polycarbonate, that are treated with solvents such as acetone will develop a cloudy appearance, greatly reducing light transmission.

== Processing ==
Two primary methods exist for manufacturing twinwall plastic sheeting: Extrusion and Ultrasonic Welding, though the latter has largely fallen out of favor.

The extrusion process involves forcing melted thermoplastic resin through an extrusion die in the shape of the end product. The extrusion process is continuous, with sections of the material cut to specified lengths. Twinwall plastic is most often manufactured in 4ftx8ft panels, with options available for different thicknesses based on specific applications. This process is extremely versatile, and can even be used to produce curved panels for use in applications such as awnings.

== Applications ==
Twin-wall polycarbonate sheeting is used primarily as an alternative to glass. Weight, flexibility, and impact strength are all benefits of using polycarbonate as a glass substitute. Applications include those in which thermal insulation is necessary while still allowing light transmittance. Green houses, window replacements, shower enclosures, partitions, light covers, patio covers, carports, and windbreaks are all modern applications for twin-wall. Specifically in greenhouse construction, the flexibility, transparency, and insulative properties contribute to industrywide success in horticulture. Twin-wall polycarbonate is able to flex in the demanding conditions of four-season greenhouses and allows for consistent temperature management because of the insulative properties.

Twinwall plastics, primarily polypropylene and HDPE, are also being increasingly utilized for waste water drainage piping. Their high strength allows them to endure the repeat stresses associated with vehicle travel over roadways, as well as the initial stress of being buried.

== See also ==
- Corrugated plastic
- Cartonplast
- Polycarbonate
- Polypropylene
- PETE
- HDPE
