= Coroplast =

Brand name of corrugated plastic

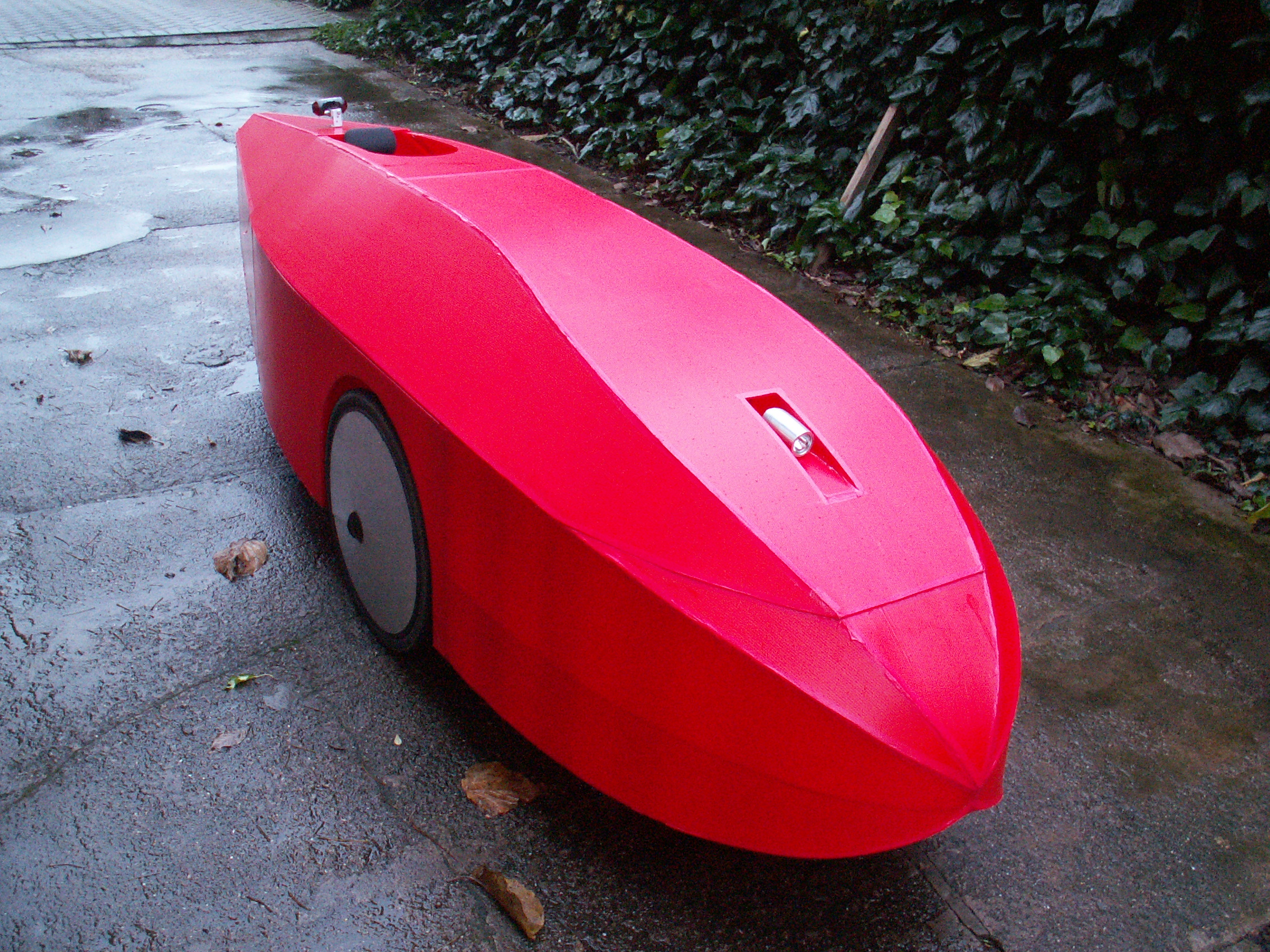
A Velomobile enclosed in coroplast

Coroplast is a brand name of corrugated plastic and a registered trademark of Coroplast, LLC, a member of the Inteplast Group of companies. Because of the success of this brand, it has become a generically used tradename and many people in North America today refer to all corrugated plastic as "coroplast". Coroplast is produced with Cartonplast technology developed by Covema in 1974.

Coroplast operates plants in Granby, Quebec; Dallas, Texas; and Vanceburg, Kentucky. On August 15, 2014, Inteplast Group, the company's major competitor, acquired majority of its assets with an undisclosed amount.

Coroplast, also called pp plate sheet ("Fluted Polypropylene Sheet"), is lightweight (hollow structure), non-toxic, waterproof, shockproof, long-lasting material that resists corrosion. Compared with cardboard, Coroplast has the advantages of being waterproof and colorfast.

Corrugated plastic is widely used for signage, plastic containers, and reusable packaging. It is also used by hobbyists in do it yourself projects such as constructing cages for small animals or model aircraft.

== See also ==
- Cartonplast
