= Marco Terragni =

Italian entrepreneur and founder of Covema

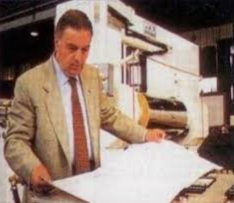
- Born: 26 April 1930; Paderno Dugnano, Italy
- Died: 29 May 2006 (aged 76); Milan, Italy
- Occupations: Businessman, inventor
- Known for: Founder and CEO of Covema; Invention of Cartonplast; Invention of Plastic-Wood; Invention of plastic Rafia; Invention of PP monofilament
- Spouses: Isabella Bruna Moriggia
- Children: 3
- Relatives: Dino Terragni

Marco Terragni (26 April 1930 – 29 June 2006) was an Italian businessman and inventor. In 1953, he founded Covema one of the biggest conglomerate in the world plastic sector along with Dino Terragni and Felice Zosi.

== Biography ==
Marco Terragni was born in Paderno Dugnano to Cav.Ercole Terragni (born in Paderno Dugnano, 1889 and died in Paderno Dugnano, 1966) and from Enrichetta Strada (born in Palazzolo Milanese, 1896 and died in Paderno Dugnano, 1970). The father descended from a decayed noble family and carried out the agricultural activity. The family was in critical economic conditions and did not have money to guarantee education for its children. With the help of the nuns, he and his brothers managed to receive adequate education. After doing military service, where he obtained the rank of lieutenant, he started some entrepreneurial activities together with his older brothers, however, proving to be bankrupt. In 1953 Marco and his brother Dino participated in the Plast fair in Milan. Here they met Felice Zosi, with whom they founded Covema (Machine Sales Commissioner) the same year, with the intention of selling the machinery just developed by Luigi Bandera, founder of the Bandera Spa in Busto Arsizio.

In the first year, they recorded an operating profit of just a hundred thousand euros. With the development of the world market, they began selling numerous machines in the United States, South America and Australia. In 1956 Felice Zosi left his position and started at the company Andrea Crespi Spa, a company that produced some components for the plastic extrusion processes. Following the discoveries made at Montecatini by Prof. Natta, Covema established a strong collaboration with the aforesaid. In 1959 Covema developed the first extrusion line in the world for the production of PP monofilament. The same year at the K fair in Düsseldorf, the Covema booth registered 13,000 visits, a number never before achieved by any participating company. In 1960, together with his brother, he developed a plastic rafia extrusion line, the first in the world, which they later sold to a South African company, which still exists today. This invention was fundamental for the development of the company, which sold about seventy plants in a year. Subsequently, the Terragni brothers began the development of the foreign branches of Covema, mainly in Spain, where they founded Covepla SA, Covema SAE and GBF SA. Later he founded Plastiform Srl in Paderno Dugnano, GBF in Bresso (which collaborated with Basell Polyolefins group), Corima Spa in Cassano Magnago, Omam in Varese, FIRS in Zingonia, Technical Die and RIAP in Brescia. In the mid-sixties, his sister Luigia also entered the company, as director of the company's financial area, and his brother Natale with whom he founded Floraplant. At Floraplant, Terragni began the production of plastic plants (produced with the injection machines of GBF spa) and PP egg carriers with Plastiform machines.

In 1965 decided with his brother to participate to the first plastic fair organized by USSR in Moscow. During this fair Terragni brothers could show to Leonid Brezhnev, president of the USSR, and to Leonid Kostandov the new technology developed by Covema.

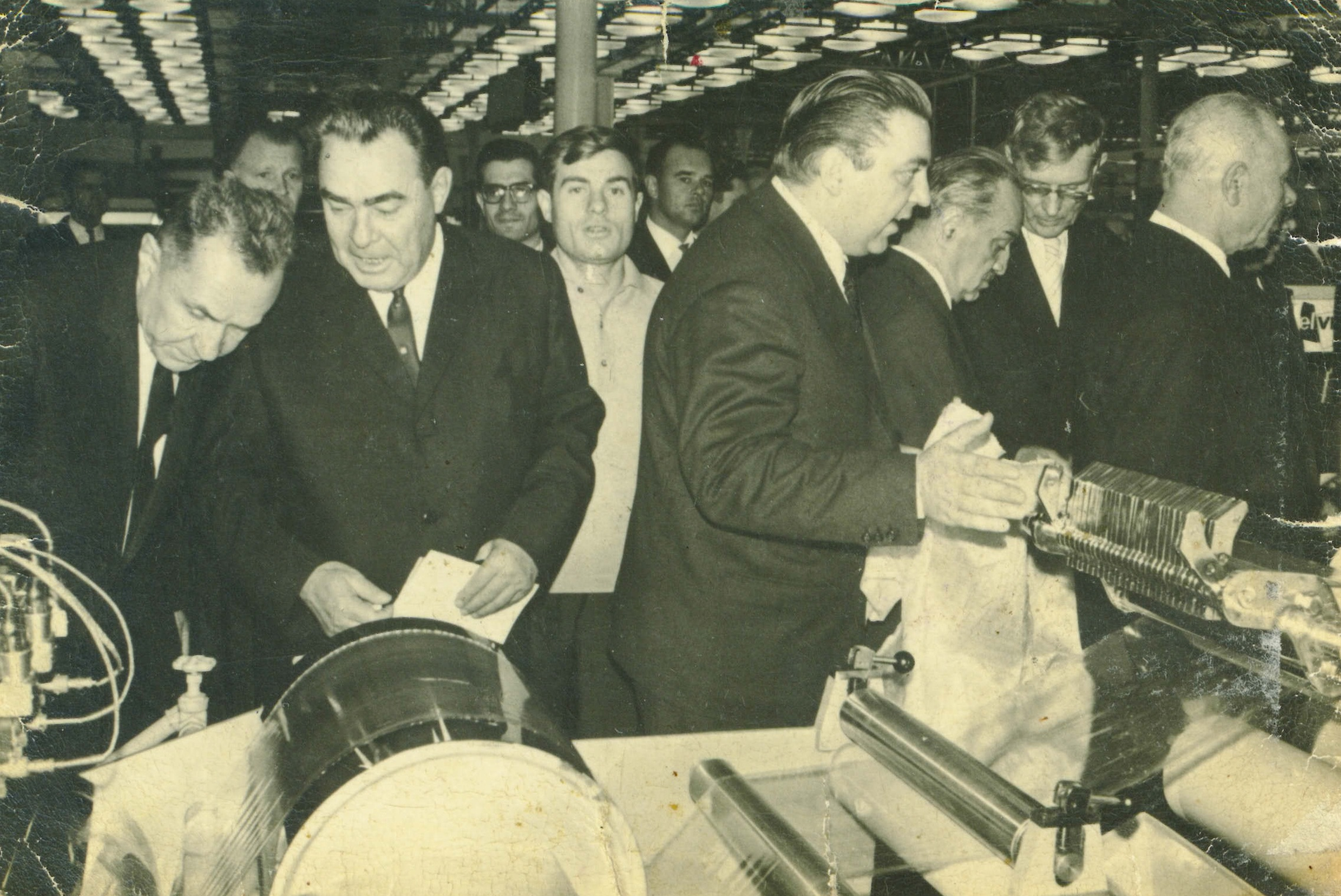
Marco and Dino with Leonid Brezhnev

In 1969, at the request of a Brazilian customer, he began to design a new process that could replace the one developed by Toshiba a few years earlier for the production of plastic honeycomb sheets. In 1970, following intense experiments carried out at RIAP spa in Brescia, he patented the new sheet extrusion process under the name of Cartonplast. Starting from the same year, as witnessed by Kenya Gazette is the holder of the Cartonplast brand. This new process proved to be particularly innovative, and it is still the one used for the production of hollow core slabs.

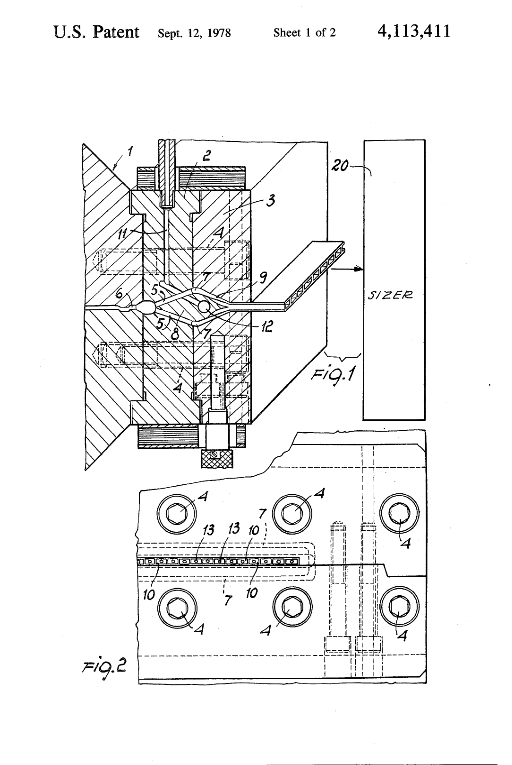
Cartonplast Patent 1974

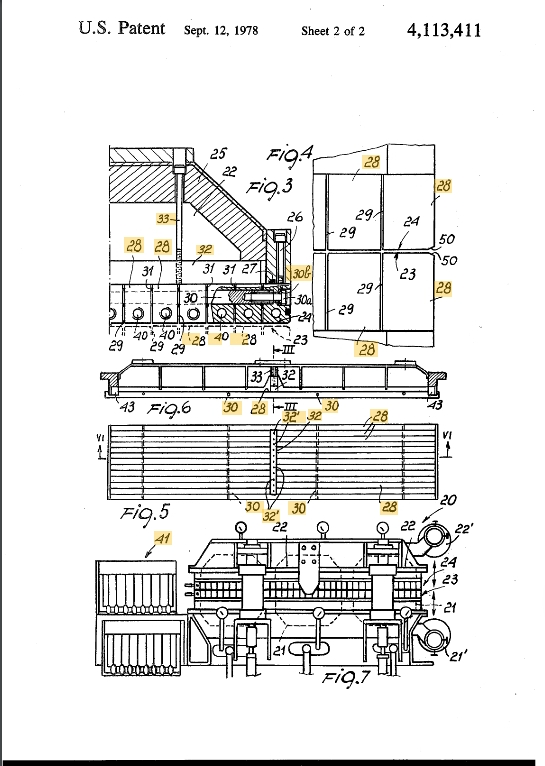
Cartonplast Patent 1974

In 1976 he was rewarded together with his brother Dino for the exports made by Covema in the three-year period 1972-73-74. In 1976 at Corima Spa, together with a group of engineers, he developed the first extrusion line of the world for the production of WPC, that is, sheets composed with thermoplastic materials intended to replace wood.

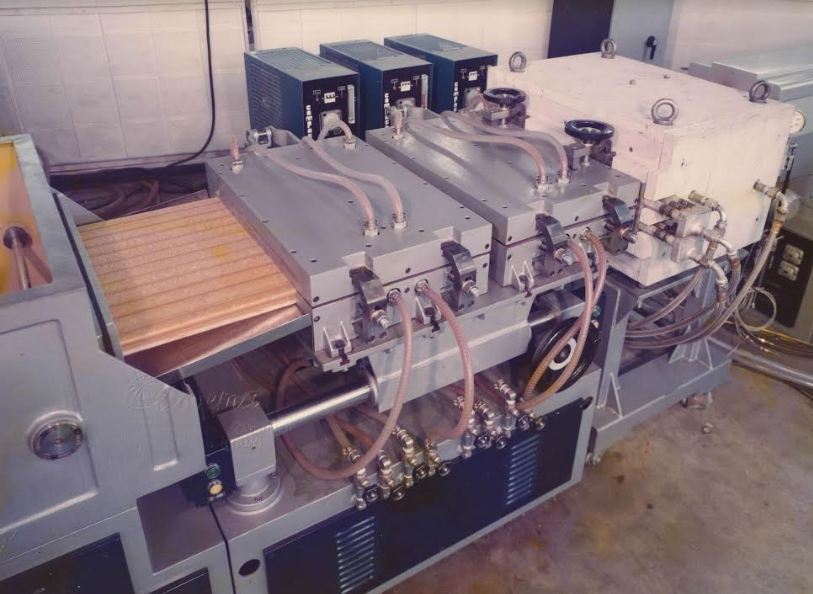
The first extrusion line of the world to produce Plastic Wood made by Covema

In 1979 his brother Dino, who was in Geneva to conclude contracts with some Swiss customers, died suddenly. In August 1979 Marco became president of the Covema group, a position previously held by his brother. The same year the group reached maximum expansion. In February 1981 Marco was awarded for the second time by the Milan Chamber of Commerce for Covema's exports in the three-year period 1978-1979-1980. In mid-1981 Marco, together with the managing directors Ambrogio Fagnani and Felice Zicari, left Covema which was managed by the heirs of Dino Terragni.

In 1982 he founded the Italproducts group together with his sister Luigia, which included TPA srl, a company founded by the Dezuani brothers, former engineers of Plastiform srl. In 1985 the company Omam Spa, part of the Covema Group, which had been in a deep crisis for two years, bought out of bankruptcy. In 1995, in collaboration with the chemical company Reedy International, he developed plants for the production of Cartonplast with chemical additives.

In 1992, a strong collaboration began with the Taiwanese billionaire YC Wang with whom he discussed the foundation of the largest company in the world for the production of Cartonplast, now sold under the tradename Intepro and Coroplast, the Inteplast company belonging to the giant Formosa Plastics Corp. Later he founded Agripak srl with the aim of producing packaging for fruit and vegetables and Cartonplast in southern Italy.

In 2002, he decided to merge Italproducts into Agripak, based in via Giacomo Puccini 5 in Milan. In 2003 he sold Floraplant SRL to the Swiss group Ovotherm. He fell seriously ill in 2005 and left the management of the company to his sons Fabio, Massimo and Patrizia, who were born to Isabella Moriggia (born 2 June in Busto Arsizio), grandson of the entrepreneur Marquis Cav. Giuseppe Moriggia. He died in June 2006 in Milan. Even now the children lead Agripak srl which, starting from 2011, has its headquarters in via Monte Rosa in Milan.

== Recognition ==
- Mercurio D'oro Prize
- Gold Medal for the exports of Covema, Milan 1976
- Gold Medal for the exports of Covema, Milan 1981

== Bibliography ==
- Archivio storico della Camera di Commercio di Milano.
- Archivio storico della Camera di commercio di Varese.
- Archivio storico della Camera di commercio di Brescia.
- Archivio storico della Camera di commercio di Bergamo.

== See also ==
- Cartonplast
- Covema
- Dino Terragni
- Rafia
- Wood-plastic composite
