= Max Crivello =

Italian illustrator, painter, screenwriter and art cartoonist

- Born: 27 February 1958 (age 68); Palermo, Italy
- Occupation: artist

Max Crivello (born 27 February 1958) is an Italian illustrator, painter, screenwriter and art cartoonist.

== Photos ==
Max Crivello on Atelier
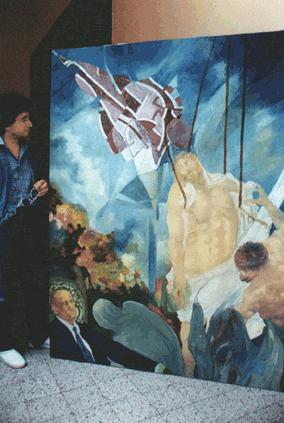

== History ==
Max Crivello, a descendant of an ancient family from Milan, born in Palermo in 1958 and he after completing regular artistic studies has travelled and worked in Italy and abroad. His artistic activity has ranged from painting to graphics and comics: since 1975 he began to exhibit and collaborated with several publishers for the printing of graphic folders, illustrated books and comics. Since 1986 he has worked as an independent cartoonist and professional illustrator for the Giornale di Sicilia and since 1987. He has executed several public monuments.

== Professional activity ==
Professor of role at a State Art Institute of the Sicilian territory, before changing role, in 1997 he founded the non-profit cultural Institution "Sicilian School of comics". suspended its activities in 2001.An attempt to resume free courses with an announcement of 2005, but in 2003 the attempt ended with an attack suffered by the Crivello.

Crivello is Director in charge in 1999 of the special inserts sector of the newspaper Oggi Sicilia with the weekly supplement Oggi Sicilia Comics. After a long isolation due to the loss of his wife, Crivello returns to painting with cycles of works dedicated to the characters of the imagination, the world of fairy tales and fiction, with the cycle of Pinocchio, Alice in Wonderland, Conan, The Holy Bible, The stories of Giulio Verne. In the performance of institutional tasks, during his teaching career he organized exhibitions and events with the free patronage of the Municipality of Palermo and the Sicilian Region, including the International Exhibition on Pinocchio and Mafia, Architecture of a pain dedicated to the memory of the two judges Giovanni Falcone and Paolo Borsellino. Then he publishes the comic strip miniseries Gli Eccellenti dedicated to the victims of the mafia, judges Giovanni Falcone and Paolo Borsellino, and General Carlo Alberto dalla Chiesa, conceived and designed together with his students under the patronage of the Regional Province of Palermo.

== The opera ==
Crivello, over 40 years, has exhibited in private and public galleries, which have dedicated several exhibitions and events. He has worked for several publishers and newspapers, making illustrations, editing specials, inserts, editorial folders, brochures, volumes and art editions. Of these exhibitions, events and editorial works, historical archives remain in public libraries and newspapers. He made books and folders such as Cola Pesce, series Myths and Legends of Sicily (5 etchings and watercolors) and La Baronessa Di Carini (4 engravings) in 1982, Don Michelino (7 color serigraphs, with texts by Francesco Carbone) 1985, The impossible loves (engravings, with texts by Renzo Bertoni) 1988, Apokalypsis (5 engravings, with texts by Francesco Carbone) (1989) Myths and Legends of Sicily (5 engravings, with texts by Bent Parodi) in 1990, Venus and Naxo (3 engravings, with texts by Francesco Carbone) in 1992, Sketch and model (18 color lithographs, with texts by Alberto Arato) (2000) Crucifixion (reprographs) The Holy Grail and the mystery of the Holy Sepulchre, the mission of the Knights Templar (2005), and the daily relive the places of the imagination (with texts by Francesco Deliziosi of 1989, which are found in the collections of the GDS. Many editorial operations, exhibitions and events have been removed because it is difficult to find online news and many other initiatives carried out and cited, of which there are still finds. In 1986 for the Giornale di Sicilia, Crivello performed journalistic services as a special correspondent, then a very young draughtsman, illustrating the stages of the first maxi-trial to the Mafia, making portraits of judges and defendants in the trial stages since photographers were not allowed in the bunker of the prison of Ucciardone, then printed in the front pages of the Giornale di Sicilia. In over 14 years of service to the Giornale di Sicilia, Crivello illustrates La saga dei Beati Paoli - un feuilleton. Followed by Coriolano della Floresta, with over 200 comic strips on texts by Salvo Licata. With Donizetti's La Favorita in 38 comic books, Crivello began an editorial series that then continued his students, in the spirit of "ethics teacher of professional rotation" that Crivello has always promoted. With the novel Non Uccidere Gesù, a graphic novel with preface by Luca Frangella published free by Mediactivity in June 2008, Crivello, engages in the script, which continues with the following work: The Brotherhood of the Blessed, an illustrated historical novel published by Mediactivity (July 2008), where the theme of the secret sects, borrowed from the saga of the Blessed Paulines, is charged with modern political and social meanings. From the Confraternity of the Blessed, a non-profit artistic operation with the aim of creating work in the publishing and film industry, was born the studio that Crivello founded together with the students. Also worthy of mention is the novel and the comic book work Le ombre di Saturno (2004), made free of charge[14], with illustrated tables and realized for solidarity purposes to donate the proceeds for social projects and support to the less well-off classes. In 1997 he created the first public monument, where he chose the theme of the territory and the journey of man on the landscape and agricultural workers harassed by mafias theme that brings back to the map and territory that every human being has of life, the work Landscape and territory and the work, polychrome ceramic panel (10 x 5 m), is commissioned following public competition for the urban park of the municipality of Lascari.

== The commemorations ==
Many years later, he created a panel for the commemoration of the centenary of the death of Joe Petrosino 1860 - 1909, (oil on panel 30 x 40), donated to the museum dedicated to the first excellent victim of the mafia "The Joe Petrosino International Association" Padula (SA), Little Italy, New York (2009), and to follow, the theme of legality leads Crivello to design and direct a theatrical work "Joe Petrosino commemoration" in Bisacquino (PA), right in the country of Vito Cascio Ferro, probative client and perpetrator of the murder, where a street dedicated to Joe Petrosino is dedicated - theatrical performance takes place in the open, and then the film project of reconstructions of the excellent murders of mafia, performs a commemorative work dedicated to the murder Joe Petrosino, screenplay, story board and direction, with the patronage and support of the Order and the Urban Police of the city of Palermo in 2011. The spiritual theme is treated by Crivello with recurrence. The cover for the monographic number 65/67 Essere nel mosaicosmo by Tommaso Romano - ed. Thule, "Spirituality e Letteratura del 2008", sees Crivello addressing the theme of infinity and infinitesimal, a recurring theme in his life as a man and artist, treated in the various artistic manifestations and exhibitions including that called Between imagination and territory Municipal Gallery (1983), the monumental work, Three panels for a triptych, presented to the Municipality of Misilmeri in 1984 divine then public monument to the Municipality of Lascari in collaboration with the citizens who collaborate in the drafting material. Crivello, feels to put order in the chaos of his complex life and rich in creative stimuli realizing the artistic path to 10 years of activity, Ordo ab Chao, presented at the Municipal Library of Palermo in 1986. The theme of love and love, sic et simpliciter in the exhibition Love Love (engravings) Galleria comunale di Messina in 1990 and then the event Lights (colored watercolors) Biblioteca comunale di Erice in 1990. With the travelling exhibition, Mafia. Architecture of a pain, anticipating by a decade the concept of new legality, this, is presented at the Galleria La Carnale in Salerno in 1991 and then around Italy; The exhibition, Implacable signs, held at Palazzo Comitini in Palermo in 1995, is addressed to a public attentive to Italian and world social life in fact the theme is politics and mafias and the hypothetical agreement between the two entities, never really tried, with these designed satires, of which there are no more finds, the politics and mafias of the time, You expose him as an anti-mafia and anti-corrupt politician, certainly inscribed in the black book of local mafias that after years later in 2003, evidently, hit him heavily, and from that moment it was difficult to reconstruct his artistic life of the past, he had to resort to the archives of libraries, the family of collectors and friends, for the loss of Crivello's memory following the aforementioned head trauma and the other incalculable consequences that led him, after ups and downs, today to no longer be able to work. Crivello is often advised not to deal with topics so hot; But he continues and with the exhibition/ ideal, Mafia architecture of a pain, continues with other works such as The Excellent, comic saga dedicated to victims of mafia, designed by Crivello with his students and sponsored by the Regional Province of Palermo and supported by the poet Tommaso Romano. Then he devoted himself to creative artistic themes, such as Illustrations and comics Palazzo delle Aquile in Palermo in 1998, followed by Germany in which he lived his period of great European scope and with the exhibition Art and Work, realized with the Patronage of the City of Isni im Allgäu, Monaco, in 2000, conceives the project on the Cartoon and Cartoon, his great love always and pushed by his students, realizes the project "We create together Sequential Arts 1" with an exhibition of personal comics and of the students of the first Sicilian School of Comics, with the patronage of the City of Palermo and with the patronage of the City of Kempten Allgäu, Monaco between 1999/2000, to follow Art and Work with Ouroboros exhibition of the plates to comics of the students of the S.S.F. with the patronage of the city of Isni im Allgäu, Monaco) (2000) *We create together Sequential Arts 2nd exhibition dedicated to Will Eisner to the Palace of the Eagles in Palermo in 2000, where the students of the first project introduce the bases of the second project already in progress, and then carried out by another subject; The study of myths stimulates the realization of the international event "The Lord of the Rings - The Worlds of Tolkien" held at Palazzo delle Aquile in Palermo in 2003, a comparison with the characters of Tolkien's Fantasy and Sicilian mythology. The return to Sicily stimulates in the Master the desire for confrontation with the province and the exhibition Adocentyn held in Bagheria, a city very dear to Crivello for his attachment to Master Guttuso, this anthology, Palazzo Cutò di Bagheria 2004 is an exhibition of the works of Crivello, organized by the students in collaboration with the Municipality of Bagheria, which anticipates the religious one on the theme "Do not kill Jesus" Exhibition of the original tables - with the free patronage of the Municipal Library Palermo in 2008, where Crivello deals with religious themes together with his students in a book preparatory to the educational editorial project Mythos and Logos study of myths and legends, as hidden historical realities, which in fact leads to "The brotherhood of the Blessed" Exhibition of the original plates - Palazzo dei Sette di Orvieto and Fantasy Horror Festival in 2010, the exhibition press conference on the themes of the secret sects and their political and social motivations in the historical panorama from the Carbonari motions, to the Freemasonry, and the Beati Paoli, fantastic sect of Sicilian avengers of 1700. Following, Crivello, Continuing, despite the illness already very acute, his artistic activity, with the project The Brotherhood of the Blessed (Beati Paoli) and the realization of the script and the story board and directing. The film product will not be produced by the Performing Arts Corporation due to its high production costs. With the study of the book of Toth, and of the Egyptian culture and hermetic and symbolic rites, the Lame di I tarocchi with texts taken from the tables of Ermete Trimegisto, with which he acquires the Hermatena Prize 2004, and his plates are exhibited at the Tarot Museum in Bologna. With the study of the book of Toth, and of the Egyptian culture and hermetic and symbolic rites, the Lame di I tarocchi with texts taken from the tables of Ermete Trimegisto, with which he acquires the Hermatena Prize 2004, and his plates are exhibited at the Tarot Museum in Bologna. With the Anthology Anthology to 40 years of artistic activity, Art and Solidarity, with the patronage of the province of Palermo (2011), closes the active phase of Crivello, in this anthology, wanted by former students, friends and fans, are explained with simplicity, all the artistic, design and operational phases of Crivello alone and with his students, for the promotion of the Arts and Letters, but above all the work in the legality with a spirit of solidarity. With the drawing for the 2013 Annual Card, donated to Anafi, Crivello performs his last official drawing dedicated to his good friend, Paolo Gallinari.

== Work ==
The institutional scholastic participation in prizes of international importance, which provide recognition to students, as in 2004, the International Festival of Cinema and Comics award of Dervio Comics and Stories[7] with the story of four tables Crash Day, September 11 performance in New York. To follow, the project of the reconstructions of the Mafia murders from Comics, Mafia: Architecture of a pain, go to the realization of film format, with the sequence plan, made in Palermo during the celebrations of the death of Joe petrosino in Piazza Marina. Among Crivello's projects, the one on comics in Sicily, in 1999, which provided three vocational training courses called - We create together, Sequential Arts - Held at the Lombardo Radice State School in Palermo. In addition, the one about Cesare Zavattini, Zavattini: an artist between Cinema and Comics, a narrative and editorial phase with the continuation of Saturn against the Earth by Zavattini, Pedrocchi and Scolari. Among Crivello's projects, the one on comics in Sicily, in 1999, which provided three vocational training courses called - We create together, Sequential Arts - Held at the Lombardo Radice State School in Palermo. In addition, the one about Cesare Zavattini, Zavattini: an artist between Cinema and Comics, a narrative and editorial phase with the continuation of Saturn against the Earth by Zavattini, Pedrocchi and Scolari.

== Legality and solidarity ==
Crivello also mentions the project on mobbing: The Mob; it included a study on the phenomenon and an exhibition of illustrations and the publication of a mini book with the history of Mobbing in Palermo in February 2007. The Mob project ended in 2008 in a screenplay written by Crivello for the making of a film never produced, The thorns of the bush and a second chapter The invisible enemy; the story is autobiographical, and talks about the phenomenon of white-collar mafias. Moreover, for the results of his projects he received several awards: Prize with plaque and medal, Art and Culture, of the Regional Province of Palermo, in 2004 for institutional teaching, which allowed students to win the prize on the comic strip of DERVIO

== Film-maker ==
Artistic merit award awarded by Ente International Joe Petrosino for the realization of the film sequence plan of the murder of Lieutenant Petrosino. He has received several awards and honors for his work in the promotion of legality and solidarity among peoples, in support of the less well-off classes and for projects dedicated to youth work in a Sicily anti-mafia and legality.

== Martyrdom ==
At the beginning of 2003 continues The project/ historical path Mafia Architecture of a pain, which is expanded with a research on the old and new motivations of the mafias in Palermo. This study produced a dossier and a script for television which was to be published. In March 2003, in Palermo, he was ambushed by unknown persons who caused a head trauma and fracture of the fingers of his left hand, with the intention of having him stop his artistic activities aimed at antimafia. The ambush is reported to the police, but the investigation does not lead to any result. This episode causes memory loss due to head trauma. After a long period of treatment, he recovers part of his memories, but much of the past is erased.

For serious health reasons, he ceased his professional and artistic activity.

=== Portfolios of prints ===
- 1979 – Cola Pesce – serie Miti e leggende di Sicilia (5 etchings with aquatint, with text by Giovanni Capuzzo).
- 1982 – La Baronessa Di Carini (4 etchings).
- 1983 – Promontori per un Natale (lithographs, with text by Aldo Gerbino).
- 1984 – Donna e peccato (lithographs with text by Francesco Carbone and poems by Giacomo Giardina).
- 1985 – Don Michelino (7 serigraphs in color, with text by Francesco Carbone).
- 1986 – Harem (serigraphs in color, with text by Bent Parodi)
- 1988 – Gli amori impossibili (engravings, with text by Renzo Bertoni).
- 1989 – Apokalipsys (5 engravings, with text by Francesco Carbone).
- 1990 – Miti e leggende di Sicilia (5 engravings, with text by Renzo Bertoni)
- 1992 – Venere e Naxo (3 engravings, with text by Francesco Carbone).
- 1993 – Il corpo e la mente (4 engravings, with text by Bent Parodi).
- 1994 – Palermo. Storia e miti (2 lithographs, with text by Bent Parodi and Salvo Licata).
- 1995 – I Beati Paoli (10 lithographs, with text by Salvo Di Matteo).
- 1996 – Santa Rosalia (25 engravings).
- 1997 – Volti di donne (10 engravings, with text by Alberoni).
- 1999 – Computer Art (10 lithographs).
- 2000 – Skethc and model (18 lithographs in color, with text by Dario Gulli and Alberto Arato).
- 2005 – Crocifissione (photocopies),
- 2006 – E sul quotidiano rivivono i luoghi dell' immaginario (with text by Francesco Deliziosi, 1989)

=== Editorial creations and comic books ===
- Fear (libro di racconti dell'orrore, with text by Dario Gulli)
- He-egli Virgilius Dc 2999 (miniserie di fantapolitica a fumetti)
- Virgilius 2999 (miniserie a fumetti, con 80 tavole a colori)
- 1000 Illustrazioni per il Giornale di Sicilia – Palermo
- La saga dei Beati Paoli (200 tavole a fumetti)
- Coriolano della foresta (200 tavole a fumetti)
- Illustrations for I cognomi, by Bent Parodi (25 illustrations)
- Illustrations for Don Michelino (50 illustrations)
- L'indifferenza uccide (Speciale "Max Living", 36 tavole a fumetti)
- Uccidere Gesu (50 tavole a fumetti)
- Favorita di Donizetti (38 tavole a fumetti)
- La vita che non-c'è (Lexy Dark horse Presente n.7 del novembre 2000, 8 tavole a fumetti)
- Uccidere Gesu seconda versione (64 tavole a fumetti, Lexy – Dark Horse edizioni 2000)
- Horror Show Pin-up (Lexy – Chaos on the edge aprile 2002)

=== Exhibitions ===
The most important since 1975 are:

- 1983, "Tra immaginario e territorio" (Galleria Comunale, con il patrocinio della Provincia di Palermo)
- 1984, "Tre pannelli per un trittico" (Comune di Misilmeri)
- 1985, "Apokaliypsis cum figuris" (Galleria comunale Randazzo di Catania)
- 1986, "A 10 anni di attività. Ricordi" (Biblioteca comunale di Palermo)
- 1989, "Incisciature" (incisioni, Galleria comunale di Catania)
- 1990, "Amori Amore" (incisioni, Galleria comunale di Messina)
- 1990, "'Luci" (acquatinte colorate, Biblioteca comunale di Erice)
- 1991, "Mafia. Architettura di un dolore" (Galleria comunale "La Carnale" di Salerno)
- 1991, "the Gospel of Giovanni" ( New Orleans Gallery)
- 1992, "Ritratto del dolore" (Galleria pubblica comunale di San Giovanni Rotondo)
- 1995, "Implacabili segni" (Palazzo Comitini, con il patrocinio della Provincia di Palermo)
- 1998, "Illustrazioni e comics" (Palazzo Delle Acquile, Comune di Palermo)
- 1999, " In Giro Per La Algovia " – Antologica Patrocinio Citta di Kempten, Monaco)
- 2003, "Il signore degli anelli i mondi di Tolkien" (tavole tratte dai racconti di Tolkien, richieste da Centro Studi Antonello da Messina – Palazzo delle Aquile, Comune di Palermo).
- 2004, "Art and Work" Antologica,(Palazzo Cutò, Biblioteca comunale di Bagheria)
- 2006, "Pinocchio" (Galleria Mammana di Palermo, con il patrocinio dell'Assessorato al Turismo della Regione Siciliana)
- 2006, "Pinocchio: burattino del passato o parabola moderna?" (Fondazione Terragni, Chiostrina di S. Eufemia, con il patrocinio dell'Assessorato al Turismo della Regione Siciliana e del Comune di Como)

=== Public art ===
- 1997, "Paesaggio e territorio", pannello in ceramica policroma (10 x 5m), parco urbano del comune di Lascari
