= Terragni =

Terragni is a surname. Notable people with the surname include:

- Attilio Terragni (1896–1958), a member of the rightist Monarchist National Party
- Dino Terragni (1927–1979), an Italian entrepreneur and inventor
- Giuseppe Terragni (1904–1943), an Italian architect
- Marco Terragni (1930–2006), an Italian entrepreneur and inventor

== See also ==
- Rodolfo Terragno
- Terrani
