= Wood–plastic composite =

Composite materials made of wood fiber and thermoplastics

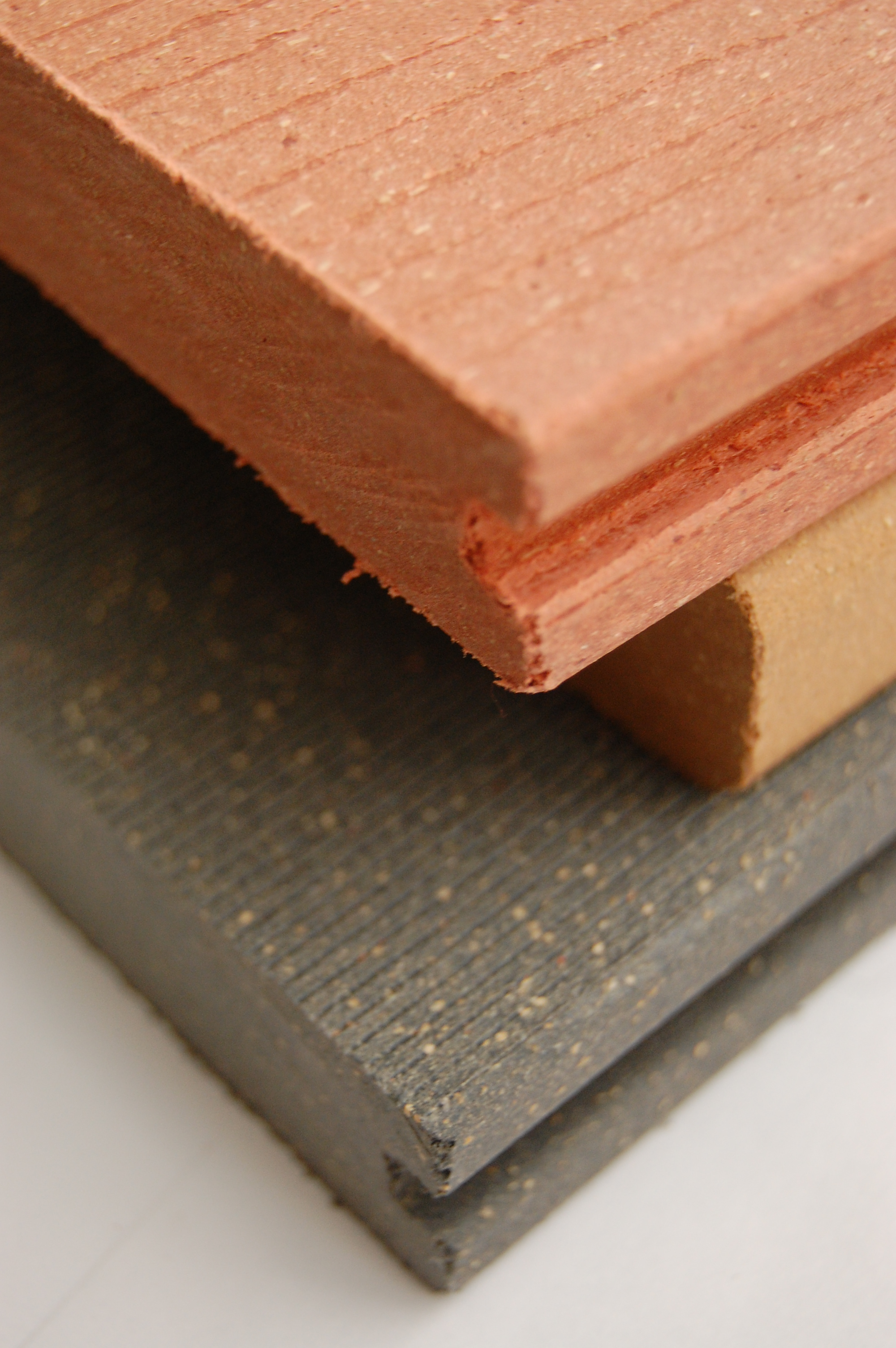
Wood-plastic composite

Wood–plastic composites (WPCs) are composite materials made of wood fiber or wood flour and thermoplastics such as polyethylene (PE), polypropylene (PP), polyvinyl chloride (PVC), or polylactic acid (PLA).

In addition to wood fiber and plastic, WPCs can also contain other ligno-cellulosic or inorganic filler materials. WPCs are a subset of a larger category of materials called natural fiber plastic composites (NFPCs), which may contain no cellulose-based fiber fillers such as pulp fibers, peanut hulls, coffee husk, bamboo, straw, digestate, etc.

Chemical additives provide for integration of polymer and wood flour (powder) while facilitating optimal processing conditions.

== History ==
The company that invented and patented the process to create WPC was Covema of Milan in 1960, founded by Terragni brothers (Dino and Marco). Covema made WPC under the tradename Plastic-Wood. After a few years from the invention of the Plastic-Wood the company Icma San Giorgio patented the first process to add wood fiber or wood flour to the thermoplastics (WPCs).

== Uses ==
Also sometimes known as composite timber, WPCs are still new materials relative to the long history of natural lumber as a building material. The most widespread use of WPCs in North America is in outdoor deck floors, but it is also used for railings, fences, landscaping timbers, cladding and siding, park benches, molding and trim, prefab houses under the tradename Woodpecker WPC, window and door frames, and indoor furniture. WPCs were first introduced into the decking market in the early 1990s. Manufacturers claim that WPC is more environmentally friendly and requires less maintenance than the alternatives of solid wood treated with preservatives or solid wood of rot-resistant species. These materials can be molded with or without simulated wood grain details.

== Production ==
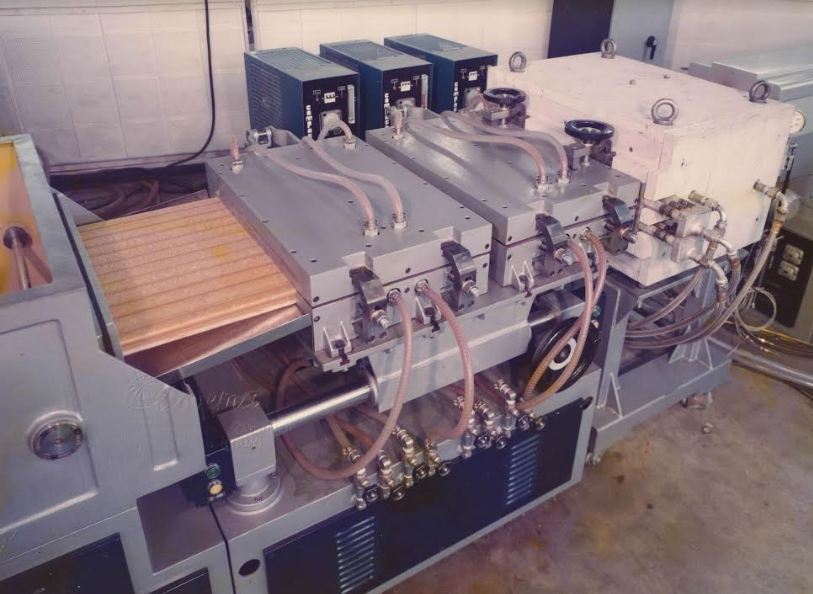
The first extrusion line to produce plastic wood, made by Covema

WPCs are produced by thoroughly mixing ground wood particles and heated thermoplastic resin. The most common method of production is to extrude the material into the desired shape, though injection molding is also used. WPCs may be produced from either virgin or recycled thermoplastics including high-density polyethylene (HDPE), low-density polyethylene (LDPE), polyvinyl chloride (PVC), polypropylene (PP), acrylonitrile butadiene styrene (ABS), polystyrene (PS), and polylactic acid (PLA). PE-based WPCs are by far the most common. Additives such as colorants, coupling agents, UV stabilizers, blowing agents, foaming agents, and lubricants help tailor the end product to the target area of application. Extruded WPCs are formed into both solid and hollow profiles. A large variety of injection molded parts are also produced, from automotive door panels to cell phone covers.

In some manufacturing facilities, the constituents are combined and processed in a pelletizing extruder, which produces pellets of the new material. The pellets are then re-melted and formed into the final shape. Other manufacturers complete the finished part in a single step of mixing and extrusion.

Due to the addition of organic material, WPCs are usually processed at far lower temperatures than traditional plastics during extrusion and injection molding. WPCs tend to process at temperatures of about 28 °C (50 °F) lower than the same, unfilled material, for instance. Most will begin to burn at temperatures around 204 °C (400 °F). Processing WPCs at excessively high temperatures increases the risk of shearing, or burning and discoloration resulting from pushing a material that is too hot through a gate which is too small, during injection molding. The ratio of wood to plastic in the composite will ultimately determine the melt flow index (MFI) of the WPC, with larger amounts of wood generally leading to a lower MFI.

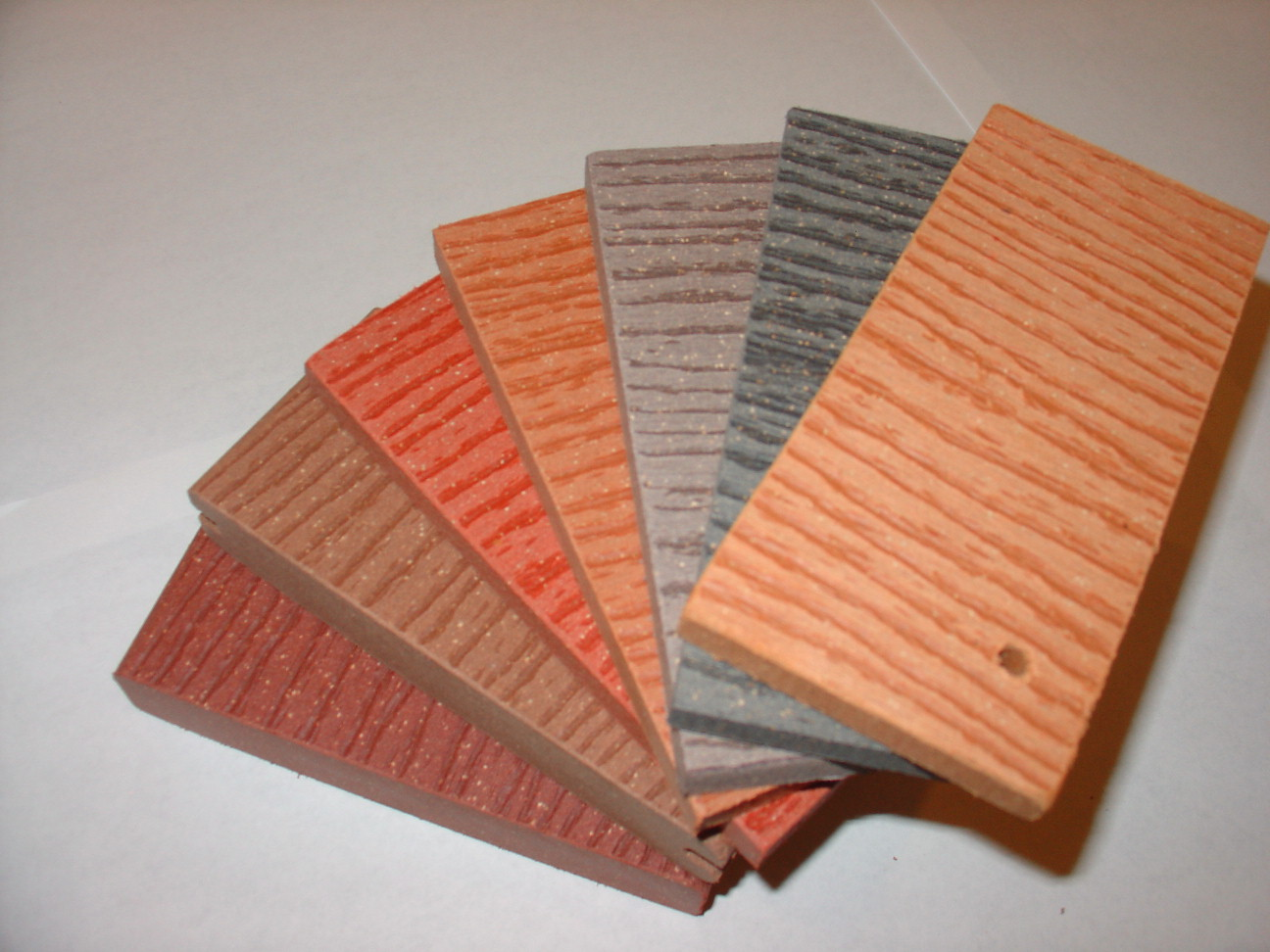
A variety of wood-plastic composites

== Advantages and disadvantages ==
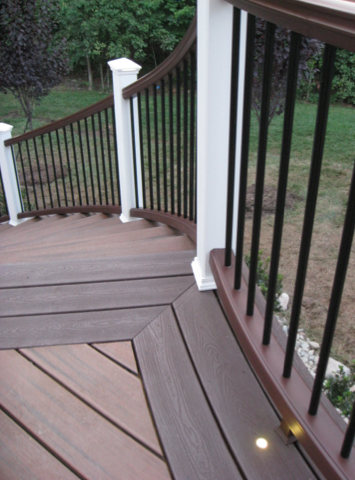
Trex composite decking

WPCs do not corrode and are highly resistant to rot, decay, and marine borer attack, though they do absorb water into the wood fibers embedded within the material. Water absorption is more pronounced in WFCs with a hydrophilic matrix such as PLA and also leads to decreased mechanical stiffness and strength. The mechanical performance in a wet environment can be enhanced by an acetylation treatment. WPCs have good workability and can be shaped using conventional woodworking tools. WPCs are often considered a sustainable material because they can be made using recycled plastics and the waste products of the wood industry. Although these materials continue the lifespan of used and discarded materials, they have their own considerable half life; the polymers and adhesives added make WPC difficult to recycle again after use. They can however be recycled easily in a new WPC, much like concrete. One advantage over wood is the ability of the material to be molded to meet almost any desired shape. A WPC member can be bent and fixed to form strong arching curves.

Another major selling point of these materials is their lack of need for paint. They are manufactured in a variety of colors, but are widely available in grays and earth tones. Despite up to 70 percent cellulose content (although 50/50 is more common), the mechanical behavior of WPCs is most similar to neat polymers. Neat polymers are polymerized without added solvents. This means that WPCs have a lower strength and stiffness than wood, and they experience time and temperature-dependent behavior. The wood particles are susceptible to fungal attack, though not as much so as solid wood, and the polymer component is vulnerable to UV degradation. It is possible that the strength and stiffness may be reduced by freeze-thaw cycling, though testing is still being conducted in this area. Some WPC formulations are sensitive to staining from a variety of agents.

== WPC sandwich boards ==
WPC boards show a good set of performance but monolithic composite sheets are relatively heavy (most often heavier than pure plastics) which limits their use to applications where low weight is not essential. WPC in a sandwich-structured composite form allows for a combination of the benefits of traditional wood polymer composites with the lightness of a sandwich panel technology. WPC sandwich boards consist of wood polymer composite skins and usually low-density polymer core which leads to a very effective increase of panel's rigidity. WPC sandwich boards are used mainly in automotive, transportation and building applications, but furniture applications are also being developed. New efficient and often in-line integrated production processes allow to produce stronger and stiffer WPC sandwich boards at lower costs compared to traditional plastic sheets or monolithic WPC panels.

== Issues ==
=== Environmental impact ===
The environmental impact of WPCs is directly affected by the ratio of renewable to non-renewable materials. The commonly used petroleum-based polymers have a negative environmental impact because they rely on non-renewable raw materials and the non-biodegradability of plastics.

=== Fire hazards ===
The types of plastic normally used in WPC formulations have higher fire hazard properties than wood alone, as plastic has a higher chemical heat content and can melt. The inclusion of plastic as a portion of the composite results in the potential for higher fire hazards in WPCs as compared with wood. Some code officials are becoming increasingly concerned with the fire performance of WPCs.

== See also ==
- Composite lumber
- Glued laminated timber
- Laminate panel
- Plastic composite (disambiguation)
- Plastic lumber
- Sleeper
- Transparent wood composite
