= Guido Donegani =

Italian businessman (1877–1947)

- Born: 26 March 1877; Livorno, Italy
- Died: 16 April 1947 (aged 70); Bordighera, Italy
- Occupations: CEO and Chairman of the Board
- Known for: Prominent Italian businessman leading the Italian chemical industrial giant Montecatini.

Guido Donegani (26 March 1877 in Livorno – 16 April 1947 in Bordighera), was a prominent Italian engineer, businessman and politician. He was CEO and President of the Italian chemical industrial giant Montecatini from 1910-1945. Due to his support to the Fascist regime of Benito Mussolini he was arrested at the end of the Second World War, but acquitted of charges of collaboration.

== Early life ==
Donegani was born in the port city of Livorno. The Donegani family was part of the Livorno business elite involved in maritime transport and import and export activities. He studied industrial engineering at the Polytechnic University of Turin where he graduated in 1901. The next year he was elected in the provincial council of Livorno.

After he had lost his wife, Anna Coppa, a few months after their marriage in 1904, he became the Commissioner of Public Works of the City of Livorno (1905-1908) in which capacity he helped to solve the long-standing problem of water supply in the city.

== Montecatini ==
Both his father Giovan Battista Donegani and his uncle Giulio Donegani were involved in the Montecatini Mining Company (Società Minerarie Montecatini), which had been founded in 1888 at Montecatini Val di Cecina in Tuscany and was active in mining copper pyrite. Through a series of complicated agreements with Italian banks and French investor groups, the Donegani's exercised a decisive role in the ownership of Montecatini.

In 1910, after the death of his father and the acquisition of Unione piriti – the major Italian pyrite producer – Guido Donegani became the CEO of the company. The same year he moved the headquarters of the company from Livorno to Milan. From that time until 1945 the fate of Donegani and Montecatini would become inseparable. He became Chairman of the Board of the company in 1918.

Under the dynamic leadership of Donegani, Montecatini would become the largest chemical company in Italy in the Interbellum. During World War I, the company acquired a decisive interest in the production of sulphuric acid, an important ingredient for the production of gunpowder. Montecatini also diversified into power stations and acquired the two largest produces of super-phosphates in Italy to become the country leading fertilizer producer. In the decade 1910-20 over 40 plants producing fertilizers and essential chemicals were established in Italy, controlling respectively 70 and 60% of the domestic market of super-phosphates and sulfuric acid.

During the war, the company expanded into explosives for their mining operations, becoming Italy's largest supplier of munitions taking control of the country's industry. After the war, Donegani transformed Montecatini from a mining company into chemical one, with a primary focus on agriculture. The company also played an important role in the industrial innovation of Italy in collaboration with the Italian chemist Giacomo Fauser who developed an innovative process for ammonia synthesis in 1920 and other pioneering chemical synthesis.

== Supporting the Fascist regime ==
Donegani strongly supported the Fascist regime of Benito Mussolini. In 1921 he became a member of parliament for the National Bloc, which aggregated the Italian political right – including Mussolini – and which was absorbed by the National Fascist Party in 1924. After the March on Rome in October 1922, Donegani proclaimed that:

"When in October 1922 the blackshirts arrived at Rome, we industrialists rejoiced and welcomed Benito Mussolini's government that gave back to the state and its laws the necessary authority."

He lauded the violent fascist squads for restoring the order and linked the future of sales of fertilizers to the end of post-war social agitation.

He sided with Mussolini during the Matteotti Crisis. Later, he would become the president of National Fascist Federation of Industries. He was often seen with Mussolini and did not hesitate to dress in the Fascist uniform. As Mussolini's personal emissary, he carried out a mission abroad to reassure the international business community about the good intentions of the new fascist regime.

The ties with the Fascist regime benefited the Montecatini company substantially, in particular during the conversion from wartime production of munitions to peacetime expansion of fertilizers and modernization of agriculture. With the Battle for Grain (Battaglia del grano) launched in the summer of 1925, the company played an almost institutional role as the main supplier of fertilizers. A clear convergence of interests existed for the production of nitrogen which is the basic element for fertilizers, but also for gunpowder and explosives. During the 1930s the Fascist government protected the company with tariffs. In return, however, Montecatini had to keep open certain less profitable operations.

The harmony between business and the regime reached its peak when Mussolini declared the necessity for economic autarky in a speech to the National Assembly of Corporations in March 1936. The planned chemical autarky was centered around Montecatini. This coincided with challenging achievements on the technical-scientific level, such as the foundation of the Azienda Nazionale Idrogenazione Combustibili (ANIC) jointly with the Azienda generale italiana petroli (Agip) and the State Railways, to produce fuel by hydrogenation of brown coal.

At the end of the 1930s the company experienced an accelerated growth: the capital, more than doubled between 1936 and 1939, the number of employees reached nearly 60,000, and the consumption of electricity one tenth of the national total. The company prestige was at its peak and Donegani was appointed Senator in 1943.

== Downfall ==
Despite the relative dispersion of ownership, some constraints from major shareholders and political circumstances, Donegani nevertheless determined the entrepreneurial strategies of Montecatini and its subsidiaries. The Second World War did not represent to Montecatini the same opportunities for growth as the First World War had. If initially there was an increase in production of some minerals, explosives, pharmaceuticals, after 1941 the difficulties of supply, the scarcity of labour, the destruction of war, the ups and downs caused by the division of the country as the war prolonged, put the firm in a difficult position.

The last years of Donegani were difficult. Accused of collaboration with the enemy he was arrested and then released by the Germans occupiers in March 1944. He was arrested again for the same reason by the British on 30 May 1945. After a brief inquiry he was handed over to the National Liberation Committee (Comitato di Liberazione Nazionale - CLN) – the former partisan coalition that formed the provisional government – which accused him of collaboration with the Fascist regime.

He had been kept in prison for over a month, but was suddenly released on 14 July 1945, sparking accusations of bribery of the local authorities by the wealthy entrepreneur in the newspapers. A new arrest warrant was issued and strikes were staged at Montecatini plants. Eventually, the scandal withered away and no charges were brought against Donegani. Nevertheless, he had to hand over the direction of the company in November 1945, and lived in hiding for about a year, until acquittal. A few months after his exoneration he died in a state of severe mental and physical decay in Bordighera on the Italian Riviera, on 16 April 1947.

After his death, the Guido Donegani Foundation (Fondazione "Guido Donegani") was established, an entity created by presidential decree on 22 February 1951, with the income of the assets of Donegani and with funds provided by the Montecatini company, in order to promote the study of chemistry in Italy.
