= Terrani =

Terrani is a surname. Notable people with the surname include:

- Lucia Valentini Terrani (1946–1998), Italian coloratura mezzo-soprano .
- Giovanni Terrani (born 1994), Italian football player

== See also ==
- Terragni
