= Road case =

Shipping container built to protect sensitive equipment

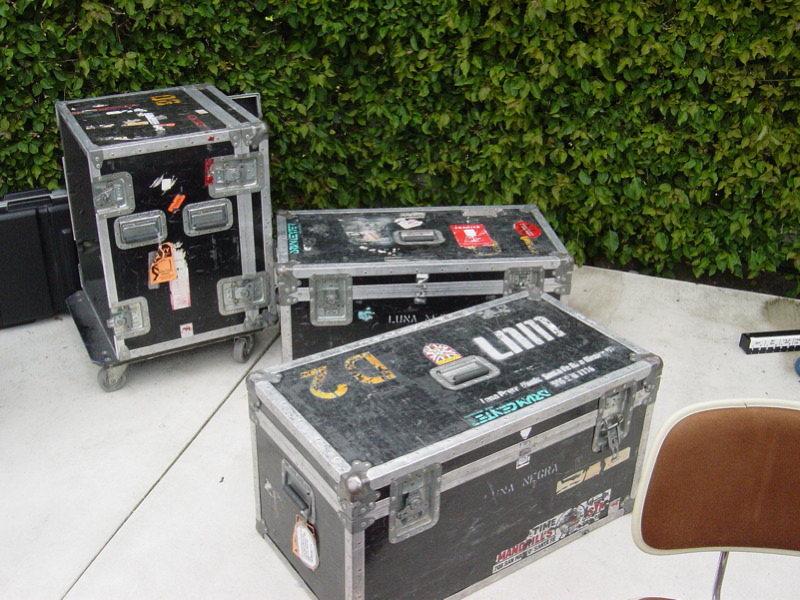
Road cases

A road case, ATA case, or flight case is a shipping container specifically designed to protect musical instruments, motion picture equipment, audio and lighting production equipment, props, firearms, or other sensitive equipment that must be frequently moved between locations by ground or air. Many varying-sized road cases can be built to outfit the needs of an entire concert tour, or custom designed individually for a specific industry or product.

The term road case is mostly used in the United States and implies that the case is primarily for road-based travel, unlike a flight case. The term originates from its use for storing and shipping band equipment while the musicians were on the road.

Today, the term road case and flight case are generally interchangeable. In different countries the same transport protective case may be called either a road case, or a flight case. For example, in the USA and Australia the term road case is often used, while in the UK and most European countries the term flight case is used.

== History ==
The history of flight case design is based on an airplane parts packaging specification. It was designed by airline packaging engineers. The specification is ATA 300. (Note: ATA is the A4A (Airlines for America) International, formerly the Air Transport Association of America located in Washington, D.C., and consists of members like Boeing, Airbus, FedEx, American, United, and JetBlue.) Category I cases are designed to withstand a minimum of 100 round trips. Category II containers a minimum of 10 round trips. Category III containers 1 round trip as defined to also include the return of a replacement part. Because of visibility requirements during nighttime airline operations, the recommended color of reusable cases is white, but the requirement is waived to permit a carrier's traditional or logo colors except for very dark colors. The first ATA 300 spec was published on August 1, 1960.

== Construction ==
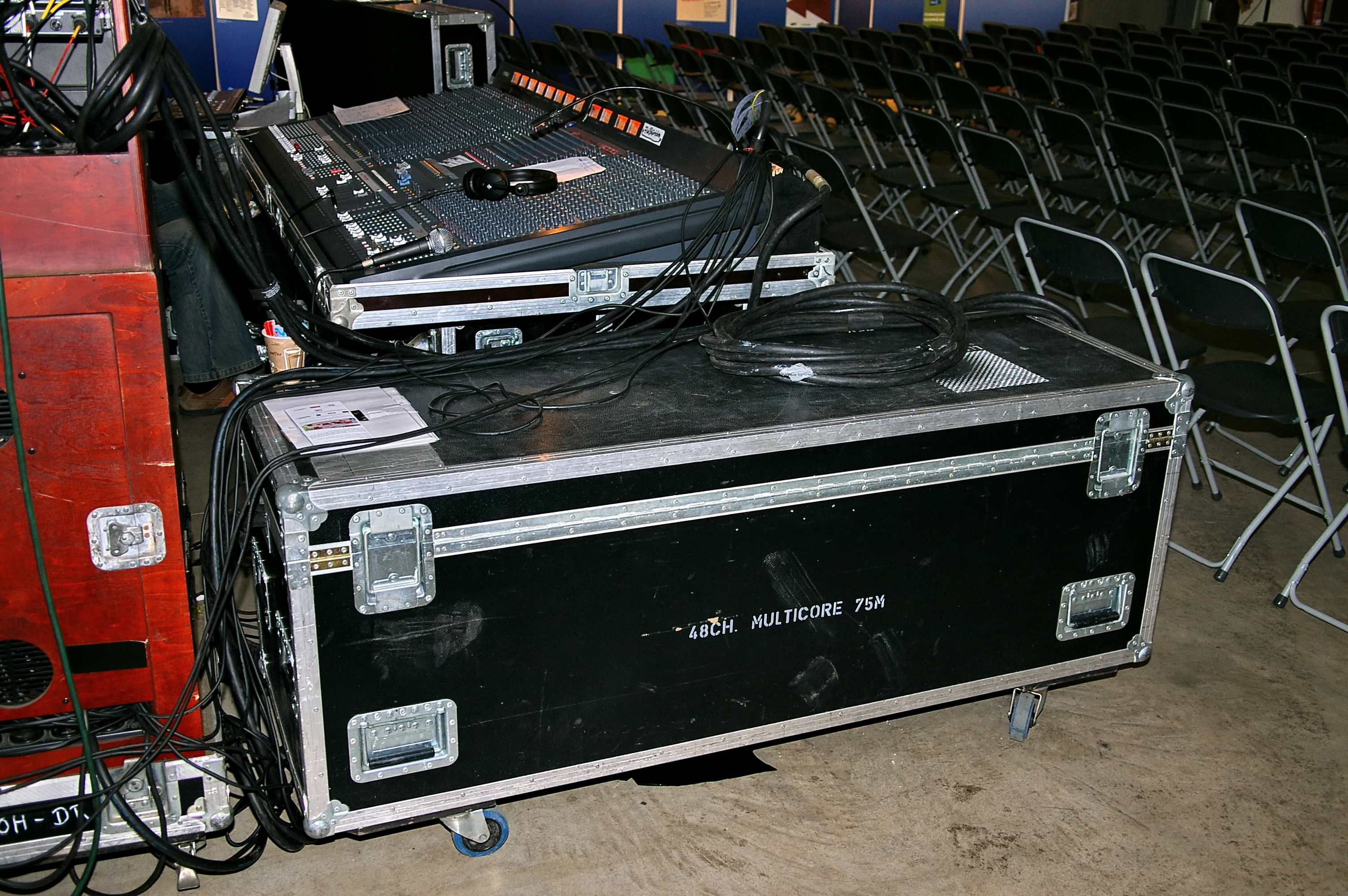
A large road case used to transport an audio multicore cable

Most cases are fabricated from panels joined by metal or plastic extrusions, molded plastic, or metal. Fabricated cases are typically made from panels constructed of two layers. An outer layer of ABS or fiberglass laminate is adhered to a middle layer of lightweight 3/16-to-1/2-inch (4.8 to 12.7 mm) cabinet-grade plywood such as birch, poplar, or maple. These two layers are known as laminate panel, and high-grade cases are made from composite material. Inside the case, an internal shock-absorbing filler such as polyurethane or polyethylene foam has cavities that correspond to the shape of the components it is preserving. Alternate shock protection methods include mounting the case contents to racks or panels attached to the case walls with shock isolators. The corners of fabricated cases are commonly reinforced with stamped sheet steel case corners commonly finished in zinc, nickel, chrome.

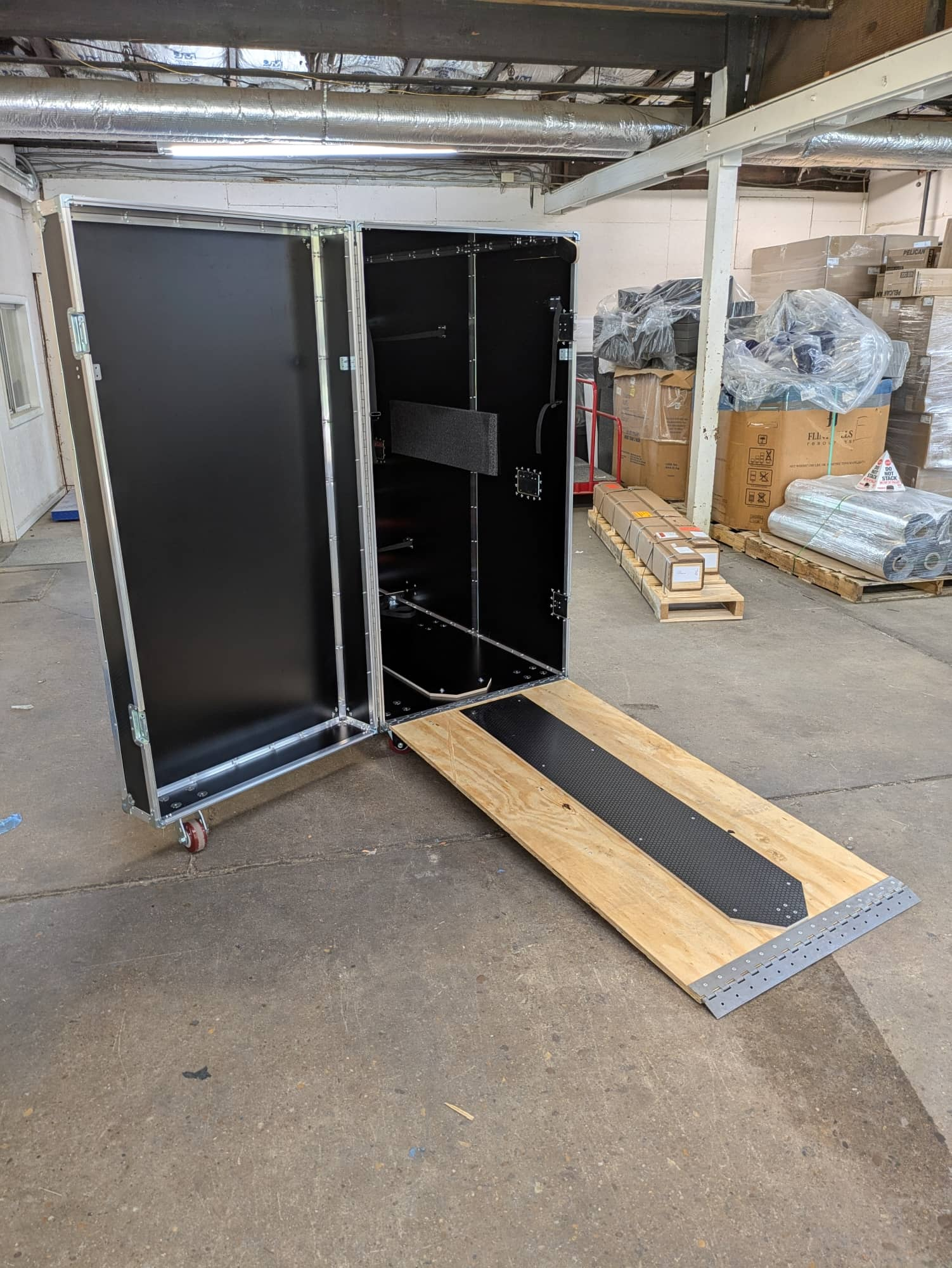
A large road case with a ramp for easy loading

The term ATA case is frequently used to describe cases that resemble those that comply with ATA Specification 300 category I or II, but have not been certified by the independent testing defined in ATA Specification 300. Category I and II cases are required to be tested both as a pre-production prototype and as a sample selected from the first production lot. Tests include stackability, drop or impact, water resistance, vibration (category I only), and penetration (category I only). Of these, the drop test, stackability, and vibration tests are probably the most severe. For cases under 50 pounds (23 kg) gross (loaded) the drop test requires 160 face drops from 30 inches (760 mm), 80 edge drops from 36 inches (910 mm), and 40 corner drops from 36 inches. The face drop distance is reduced to 21 inches (530 mm) up to 100 pounds (45 kg), 18 inches (460 mm) 150 pounds (68 kg), 16 inches (410 mm) 200 pounds (91 kg) or more. Category II cases are dropped one-tenth as many times from 22 inches (560 mm) and 27 inches (690 mm) at 50 pounds, and proportionally for heavier cases. The stackability test requires every case face over 0.37 square metres (4.0 sq ft) to support 135 kilograms (298 lb) centered on 0.09 square metres (0.97 sq ft) of the face for 24 hours. The vibration test searches for the four strongest resonances between 5 and 50 Hz, and then tests each at 0.5 standard gravities (4.9 m/s^{2}) for 2 hours on each principal axis. The penetration test is a 6-kilogram steel bar 3.2 centimeters in diameter with a hemispherical end dropped 0.5 meters on the weakest point. For all tests no degradation or functional damage is allowed.

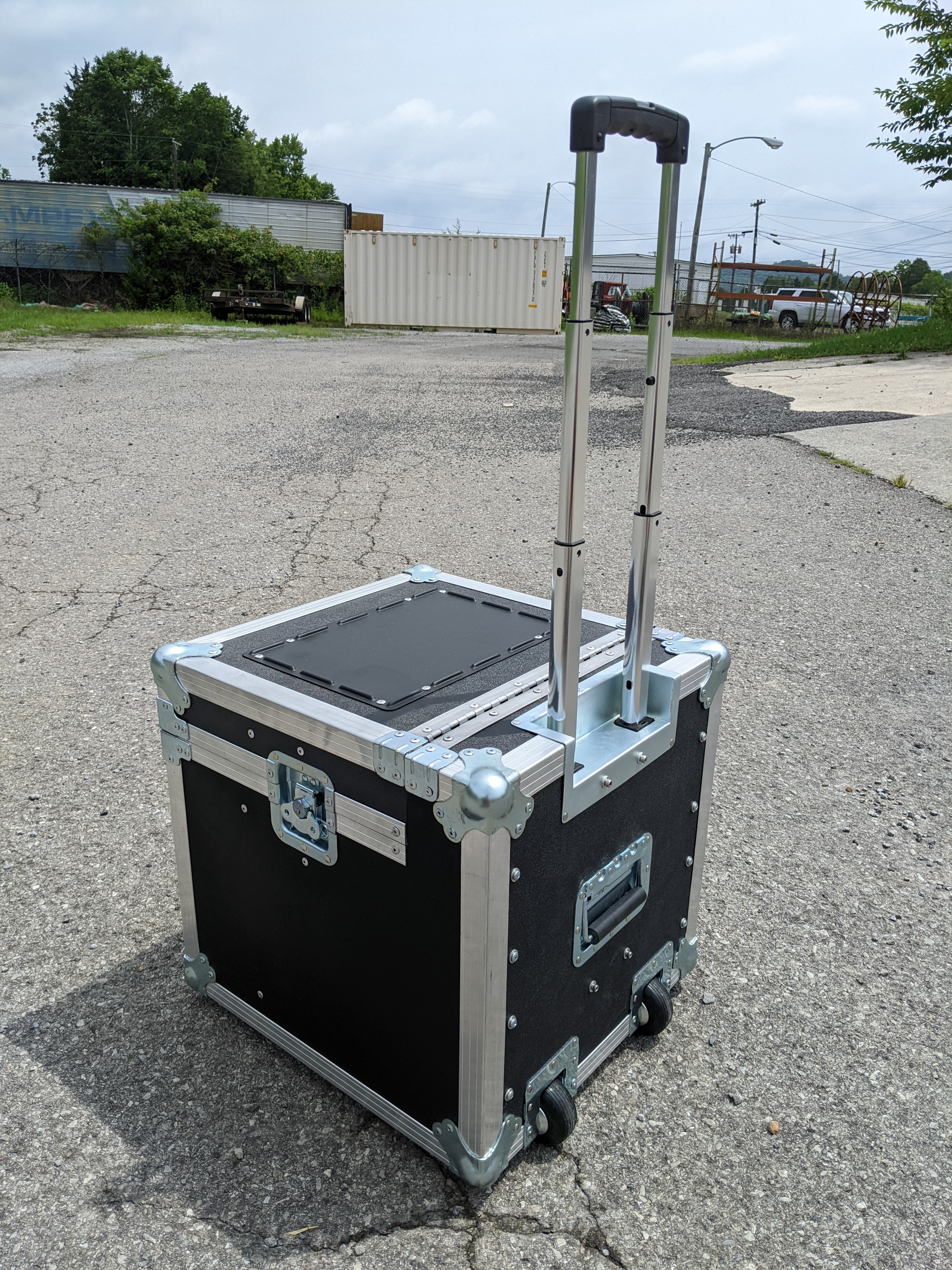
A small road case with a telescoping handle and wheels

Caster wheels are often built into or attached to the case for ease of transit, and may be removable to prevent damage to other containers or to the airframe.

Road cases can be equipment with additional features such as ramps, work stations, rack mount rails, drawers, trays, shelves, telescoping handles, removable sides and lids, custom foam inserts, and dividers.

Molded cases are typically made of polyethylene or polypropylene plastic by injection molding or rotational molding and may be gasketed for splash protection. They typically have similar interior and wheel options as fabricated panel cases. The ATA specified performance temperature range −40 to 130 °F (−40 to 54 °C) tends to exclude thermoplastic cases large enough to be subject to the stackability test.

Cases may be further customized by adding a power adapter and a computer fan. Thus certain equipment may operate in transit or at destination without leaving the protection of the case.

== Uses ==
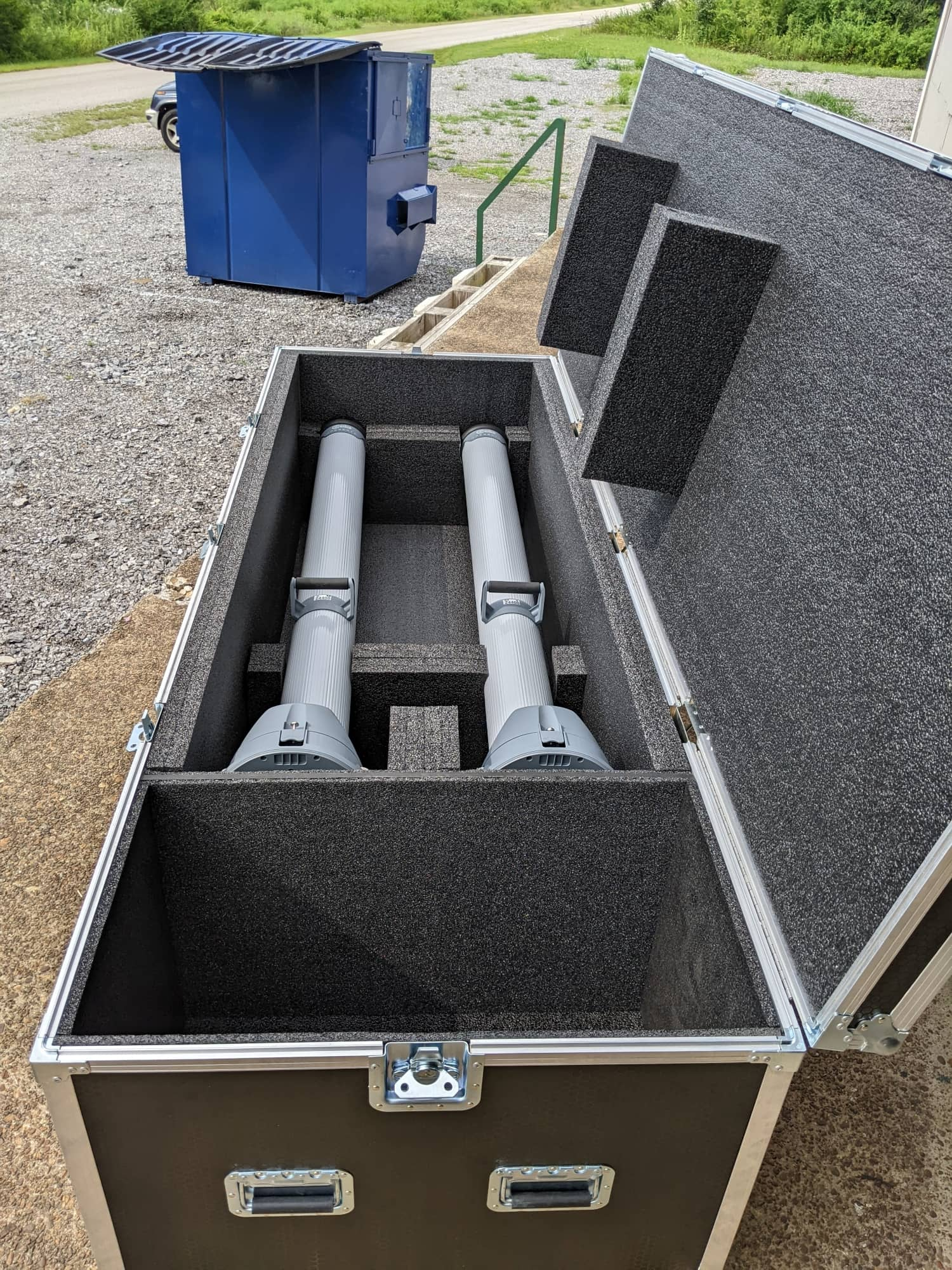
A large road case with custom foam

Typical uses for road cases on tour are wardrobe, hair and make-up, catering, rigging, backline, sound reinforcement equipment, stage lighting, video, production and carpentry. Road cases got their name because they are usually used by touring entertainment companies that need to take their show out 'on the road'. Road cases configured with rackmounts are widely used on the road for pro audio, lighting, sound recording and video. Other applications include motion picture production, military, sports, medical, rental and staging.

In December 2019, Carlos Ghosn, the former head of the Renault–Nissan–Mitsubishi Alliance, reportedly escaped from Japan hidden in a road case.

== See also ==
- Transit case
