= Montecatini (company) =

- Native name: Montecatini – Società Generale per l'Industria Mineraria e Chimica
- Type: Public
- Industry: Chemicals; Mining; Fertilizers; Petrochemicals
- Predecessor: Società Anonima delle Miniere di Montecatini
- Founded: 1888
- Defunct: 1966
- Fate: Merged with Edison
- Successor: Montedison
- Headquarters: Milan, Italy
- Key people: Guido Donegani (CEO and President)
- Products: Sulfuric acid, fertilizers, industrial chemicals, petrochemicals, synthetic materials
- Number of employees: 50,000+ (late 1930s)
- Subsidiaries: ACNA; Farmitalia; ANIC (joint venture); Rhodiaseta

Montecatini was an Italian chemicals company founded in 1888. Historians have considered the company a "quasi-monopolist of the Italian chemical industry" in the time between World War I and the end of World War II.

== History ==
Montecatini was founded as a small mining business in Montecatini Val di Cecina. The company originally operated a copper pyrite mine in 1888. In 1910, Guido Donegani was named director of the company, and production subsequently shifted from copper ore production to pyrite production as a starting material for sulfuric acid production.

Following the increase of sulfuric acid production, Montecatini expanded into the greater superphosphate fertilizer industry. By 1920, the company had acquired the two largest phosphate fertilizer producers, Unione Concimi and Colla e Concimi. The company became dominant in chemical industry of Fascist Italy.

Between 1948 and 1950, Montecatini built a large power station to generate electricity from Lake Reschen.

In the 1950s, Montecatini collaborated with Covema and the Research on Industrial Application of Polyolefins (RIAP) of Bergamo. Together, the companies developed an extrusion machine.

In 1966, the company merged with the Edison company, subsequently leading to the formation of the company Montedison.

== See also ==
- List of Italian companies
- Covema Group
