= Laminate panel =

Laminate panel is a type of manufactured timber made from thin sheets of substrates or wood veneer. It is similar to the more widely used plywood, except that it has a plastic, protective layer on one or both sides. Laminate panels are used instead of plywood because of their resistance to impact, weather, moisture, shattering in cold (ductility), and chemicals.

Laminate panel layers (called veneers) are glued together with adjacent plies having their grain at right angles to each other for greater strength. The plastic layer(s) added for protection vary in composition, thickness, color and texture according to the application.

== Types ==
A number of varieties of laminate panel exist for different applications.

- Plywood + ABS pipes

Panels

- Plywood + FRP laminate panels
- Plywood + aluminum laminated panels
- Lightweight composite panels

== Sizes ==
The most commonly used thickness range from 3.2 mm (1/8 in) to 13 mm (1/2 in) and 9.5 mm (3/8 in), in a variety of colours and textures.

== Applications ==
Laminate panels are used in many applications that need weather-proof, impact resistant sheet material. Typical end uses of spruce plywood are:

- Floors, walls and roofs in cleanrooms
- Vehicle internal body work
- Packages and boxes
- Road cases

== See also ==
- Glued laminated timber
- Wood-plastic composite
