= Simple Plastic Airplane Design =

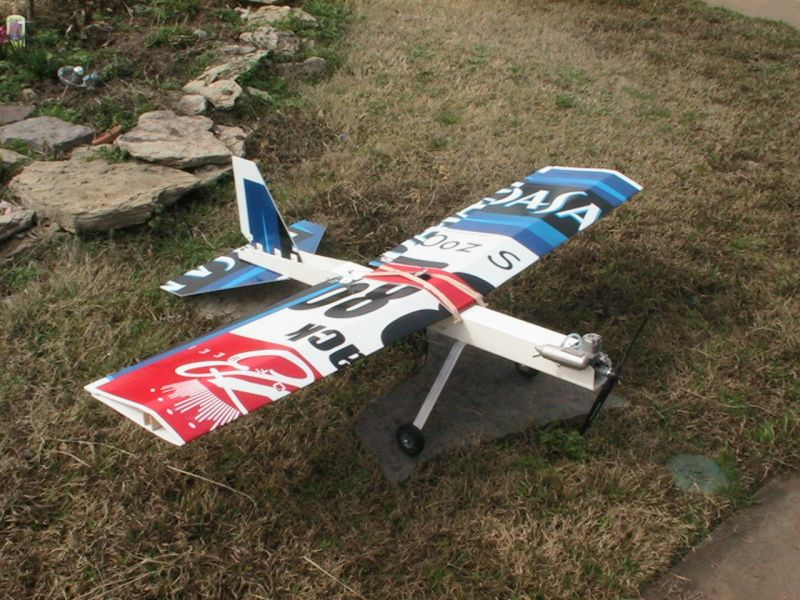
SPAD Debonair

Simple Plastic Airplane Design (SPAD) is a type of radio controlled model airplane.

The R.C. aircraft is usually, though not always, built with the body consisting of a lightweight plastic material such as PVC gutter downspout or an aluminium rail. The wings are made of an equally light material such as foam or coroplast. The remaining components added to the plane are virtually the same as can be found in any other R.C. aircraft of similar size.

This concept of building simple radio controlled airplanes using cheap materials without the time-consuming and painstaking process of working with balsa wood and iron-on plastic coating was popularized by a web site created in the late 1990s, spadtothebone.net. While this web site, and the many original plans and articles still exist, the main gathering place for Spad enthusiasts on the web today resides at rcgroups.. R/C Report magazine author Frank Costa covered Spads from April 2003 to July 2004.

SPADs are preferred to other materials because they are cheaper and are easy to work with, painting is not required, the plastic can optionally be decorated with vinyl sheets which are available in any signboard making shop at very cheap price. The hinges for the control surfaces can be made by sheering one of the twinwalls of the plastic sheet and no special hinging device is required.

SPAD Modelers use corrugated plastic sheets of various thickness, such as 2 millimeter (like the flying wings or electric gliders for which 2mm sheet are preferred) and 4 millimeter. These sheets are generally used by signboard makers and many times, when these sheets are discarded, the modelers have a choice to use them to build model airplanes.

The choice of propulsion can be either internal combustion engine or electric motors as with balsa counterparts.

Corrugated plastic planes are simpler alternative to the traditional balsa wood based R.C. aircraft for a variety of situations. Most of the SPAD airplanes do not use balsa which saves considerable cost. They withstand crashes better than balsa counterparts because of their resilience and hence are a good choice for beginners. Good trainer planes and gliders can be made from SPADs. SPAD modelers make equally good advanced planes that can be made with corrugated plastic. They include: RC Airplane Combat, 3D Flying, and are preferred in places where the flyers would normally not risk a more expensive plane and yet want the same flying characteristics of balsa planes.

For making a SPAD plane, the modeler (usually a beginner) can copy the dimensions of a well known balsa trainer and makes the SPAD plane using the same dimensions and adapting to the building techniques of a SPAD plane. The plane can also be built from plans or can be scratch built (usually, the modeler draws his/her own plans and makes the plane, though this is mostly attempted by experienced modelers)
