= Dino Terragni =

Italian entrepreneur and founder of Covema

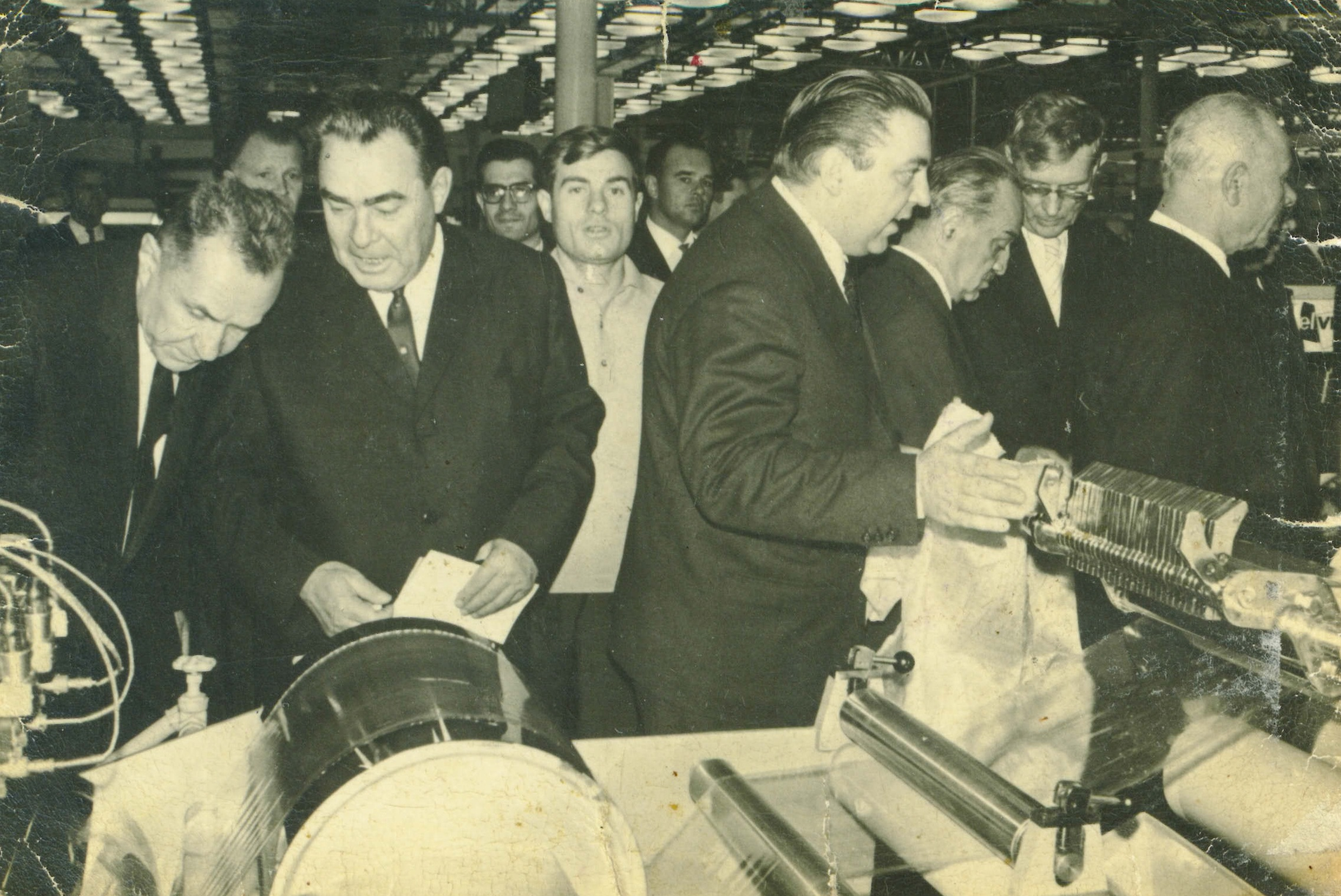
- Marco and Dino Terragni with Leonid Brezhnev in 1965
- Born: Dino Terragni; September 10, 1928; Paderno Dugnano, Italy
- Died: 21 June 1979 (aged 50); Geneva, Switzerland
- Occupation(s): entrepreneur, inventor
- Known for: Founder and president of Covema
- Spouse: Angela Rossetti

Dino Terragni (10 September 1927 – Geneva, 21 June 1979) was an Italian entrepreneur and inventor, founder and president of Covema, Corima Spa, Plastiform Srl, GBF Italia Spa, GBF Iberica SA, Omam spa, Covepla SA, Covema SAE, Firs Spa, RIAP Srl, Floraplant Srl and Technical Dies Spa. He was an innovator in the production of machinery for plastic material processing.

== Early life ==
Born in 1927 in Paderno Dugnano to Ercole Terragni (born in Paderno Dugnano in 1889 and died in 1966) and by Enrichetta Strada (born in Paderno Dugnano in 1896 and died in 1970). Two brothers and two sisters. Despite the family economic situations, she managed with the help of the nuns, to obtain an adequate education.

In the 50s, he met Felice Zosi at the Plast fair in Milan, with whom he began to work in the field of production and sale of machinery for plastic processing. In 1953 the two decided to found Covema (Comissionaria Vendita Macchine) in Milan with headquarters in via Fontana 1, with the aim of marketing the machinery that Luigi Bandera was developing in those years, an entrepreneur active in the production of machinery for the transformation of materials plastic. The first year the company achieved a turnover of a few million lire.

With the help of a small loan from a relative, he decided to continue the entrepreneurial adventure alone by finding a way to become the sole partner of Covema. He marries Angela Rossetti, from who he had three children. He appointed his brother Marco as sales manager for the America area and his sister Luigia as secretary. In the following years, Covema greatly developed the American and Spanish market. This success led Dino, at the end of the 1950s, to take the decision to produce his own extrusion plants, becoming an entrepreneur.

In the 60s Covema developed the first extrusion plant in the world for the production of raffia and sold 70 plants in one year. [2] This was decisive for the strong development of the company which subsequently began the production of thermoforming (Plastiform srl) and injection (GBF mechanical constructions Spa) machines. Also in those years, Dino Terragni founded RIAP Spa in Bergamo with the aim of developing new technologies in collaboration with Montedison. In 1970, the RIAP engineering team patented the process for the production of Cartonplast. In the years 1972, 1973 Covema achieved great success by opening branches abroad, founding new companies (see above) and managing almost 700 employees with a consolidated turnover of the group around 50 billion lire, becoming at the time one of the most largest in the world for the production of machinery in the plastics sector. [3]

A foreign company offered to take over the entire group, but Dino refused the proposal, although it is said to have been very important, he decided to continue the adventure and that it was not yet time to sell his company. On 21 July 1979 Dino Terragni died suddenly due to a heart attack in Geneva where he had gone to do some business with Arab clients.

Like most of the successful entrepreneurs of that time, tireless worker, never a holiday with the family if not for a few days, self made man, his disappearance immediately caused the decline of Covema and all the companies in the group.

== Death ==
On 21 July 1979 Dino Terragni died due to a heart attack while in Geneva on a business trip.

== Recognition ==
- Mercurio D'oro Prize
- Gold Medal for the exports of Covema

== See also ==
- Cartonplast
- Covema
- Marco Terragni
- Wood-plastic composite

== Bibliography ==
- Archivio storico della Camera di Commercio di Milano.
- Archivio storico della Camera di commercio di Varese.
- Archivio storico della Camera di commercio di Brescia.
- Archivio storico della Camera di commercio di Bergamo.
