= Covema =

Italian conglomerate

Covema group
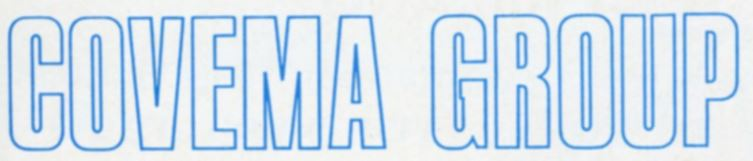
- Type: Conglomerate
- Industry: Plastic
- Founded: Milan, Italy January of 1953
- Founders: Felice Zosi, Dino Terragni and Marco Terragni
- Successor: AGRIPAK srl
- Headquarters: Via Fontana 1, Milan, Italy
- Number of locations: 45
- Area served: Worldwide
- Key people: Marco Terragni (CEO) Dino Terragni (President)
- Products: Thermoforming (Extrusion and injection machinery for plastic)
- Operating income: ▲€600 million
- Net income: ▲€20 million
- Owners: Marco and Dino Terragni
- Number of employees: 2000
- Divisions: Corima S.p.A.; GBF S.p.A.; Plastiform S.r.l; Covepla S.A.; RIAP S.r.l; OMAM S.p.A.; OMAM International S.A.; FIRS S.p.A.; GBF S.A.; Technical Dies S.pA.; Floraplant S.r.l; Covema S.A.E.
- Website: agripak.com

Covema srl was a historic Italian company specializing in the design of plastic processing machinery, based in Milan, via Fontana 1. Founded in 1953 by the Terragni brothers, it also included the companies Corima spa, GBF spa, GBF iberica, RIAP srl, FIRS spa, Covepla Spain (specialized in thermosetting machines), Italproducts srl, Omam spa, TPA srl, AGRIPAK srl, Floraplant srl, Interfinance SA, Technical Die spa, Covema SAE. The technology that Covema has developed since the 1950s is merged into Agripak srl based in Milano and managed by the sons of Marco Terragni: Fabio Terragni (president), Patrizia Terragni and Massimo Terragni (managing directors).

== History ==
Founded in Milan in 1953, Covema (Commissionaria Vendita Macchine) first devoted itself to the commercialization of plastic processing machinery. This marketing activity was a great help to the growth and development of the Luigi Bandera spa in Busto Arsizio, which at the time was making the first blown film extrusion lines to produce plastic bags and films. One of the most successful markets of this initial activity of Covema was the US market where, thanks to Covema's intermediation, the Luigi Bandera spa exported dozens of blown film extrusion lines during the 1950s. Marco Terragni was the main proponent of such sales success towards the North American market.

In the late 1950s, the Covema began the production and sale of its blown film extrusion lines. In the meantime, exports to the Latin American markets began and Marco Terragni was asked during his missions abroad to produce in plastic various objects made so far of wood or paper or glass. Thus began a phase of research and development that led Covema to create two poles for specific research such as the FIRS for the production of machines for window and door profiles and the RIAP (Research Industrial Applications Polyolefin) of Zingonia (Bergamo) for the development of polypropylene (PP) applications recently polymerized by Professor Giulio Natta at the Milan Polytechnic. Thus were born the first plants for the production of synthetic raffia and monofilaments: the first fair in which Covema showed in operation a raffia plant in PP was Equiplast of Barcelona in 1969. Montecatini intensively collaborated with RIAP for the development of various grades of polymers and copolymers of PP. In RIAP some downstream plants were also developed to produce raffia or monofilament articles (fabrics, ropes, woven bags, etc.).

Still at the RIAP at the beginning of the 1970s a group of researchers coordinated by Marco Terragni created a first pilot plant for the production of Cartonplast (PP alveolar sheets). Many other developments in technology were made in those years by Covema, including the extrusion in flat head of PP sheets and the thermoforming of these sheets to produce disposable cups. Various other technologies for the production of pipes, machines for covering electric cables, extrusion lines for WoodPlast (synthetic wood), multi-filaments spinning plants of the POY type (Partially Oriented Yarns) or FDY type (Fully Drawn) or BCF type (Bulky Continuous Filaments) for nylon, PA, PP, PET were also developed by Covema for the production of upholstery, fabrics for the automotive industry, carpets and rugs, industrial filters, technical garments. At the company Corima at Cassano Magnago, Covema realized the specific development of multi-filament plants and systems to cover electric cables.

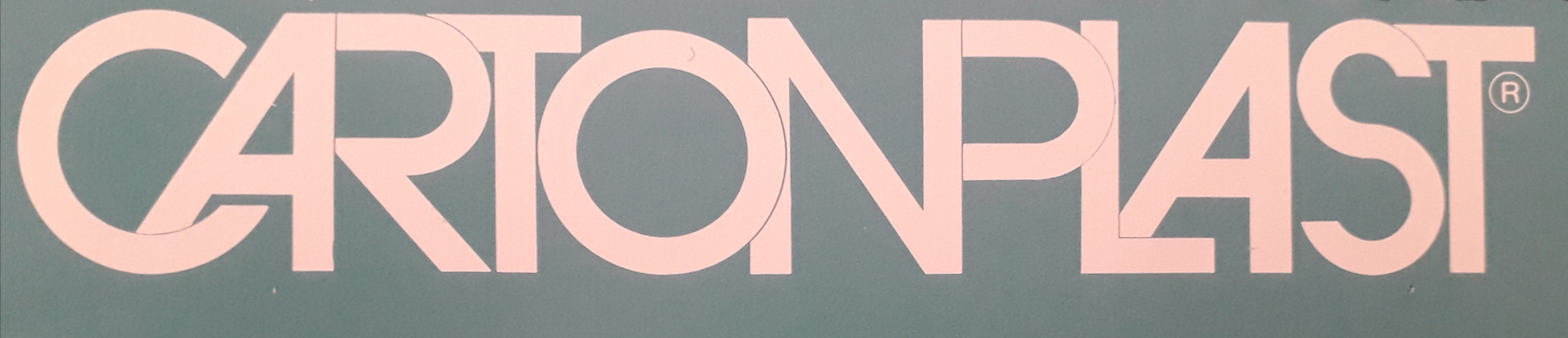
Cartonplast logo

The Plastiform of Paderno Dugnano was instead created by Covema for the development of technologies for thermoforming both from sheet and board. The FC series machines were developed to form and cut in the same station using match metal system; the Rotoform series, which formed and cut with a separate cutting press and the Multiform series that formed, die cut, and stacked in line. Plastiform also produced thermoforming machines for board to produce, for example, counter door and inside of refrigerator cells, bathtubs. Also at Plastiform, the first in line extrusion and thermoforming were developed and a compact extrusion / calendering system (named subsequently Compact) was designed to be put in line with thermoformers especially for the FC and Rotoform series.

The Rotoform machines were the first ever used by the Swiss group Ovotherm for the production of polystyrene (PS) egg containers. During the 1970s, Ovotherm opened several factories all over the world for the production of eggs in PS and Covema was the partner who supplied the necessary machines for thermoforming. Other companies belonging to the Covema group were Ombia spa of Solbiate Arno, which specialized in the start of the production of pipe systems and the GBF of Milan, which dedicated itself to the production of injection molding machines. GBF Spa worked intensely with Basell Polyolefins of Milan and developed with it some important patents.

Also worthy of note is the collaboration of Covema with the company Magic S.p.A. of Monza specialized in the production of extrusion / blow molding lines for plastic bottles.

== Covema patents ==
=== Covema Srl ===
- A process for the production of laminated panels, particularly for coating and the like, as well as' plant for its realization.
- The panel structure particularly coupled for coatings and the like.
- Plant for the realization of particularly hollow profiles made of plastic material.
- Sound-absorbing and heat-insulating panel structure.
- An extruder for the extrusion of hollow tubular elements in plastic and container material obtained with said tubular elements.
- Calibrator for extruded profiles are made of plastic material.
- Calibrator for extruded profiles are made of plastic material.
- An extruder for the extrusion of plastic hollow sides profile.
- Extrusuradora for the production of shaped hollow plastic material.
- Extruder for producing plastic hollow profile material.
- Operating machine for boring and facing and machining head of a machine tool.
- Extruders for plastics.

=== Covema SAE ===
- Improvements in closing mechanisms for rotating blowing heads.
- Regulator blowing.
- Sizer.
- Tube winding machine to apply plastic industrial sacks.

=== Plastiform Srl ===
- Solid-state heat-moulding polypropylene sheets - involves passing sheet intermittently across a continuous heating zone, to raise the temp. or the sheet to near its m.pt.
- Thermoforming high crystalline content polymers.
- Formningsforfarande for hogkristallina polymerer, speciellt polypropenfolier.
- Thermoforming sheet material.
- Procedure for thermoforming polypropylene sheet, solid state processing.

=== OMAM Spa ===
- Apparatus profiling tubes.

=== Corima Spa ===
- Mario Miani, extrusion head for the production of synthetic yarns.
- Giuseppe De Maria and Mario Miani, thermoplastic extrusion press - with two chambers and multiple extruder screws.
- Boscato Silvano, device for winding and unwinding of materials constant tension on reels.
- Carlo Rattazzi and Giuseppe De Maria, continuous filter for plastic.

=== Floraplant Srl ===
- Separator device of portaudva arranged impilanti containers.

=== GBF costruzioni meccaniche Spa ===
- Device for the production of plastic and elastomer bearings.

=== Agripak srl ===
- Massimo Terragni and Daniele Perrella, process and apparatus for machining a sheet of thermoplastic material with hollow profile.
- Thermoforming machine with stacking device of thermoformed articles.
- Product precious materials obtained from fibers of textile origin and their galvanic process.

=== Italproducts srl ===
- Structure of extruded honeycombed profiled plastic.
- The preheating oven particularly for panels to be formed.
- A process for the microperforation of extruded multiwall sheets.
- Structure of extruded honeycombed profiled plastic.

=== TPA srl ===
- Tray, container and the like with drainage characteristics.
- A method for obtaining formed articles from alveolar sheet-like elements made of plastics, as well as 'articles so'.

== Honors ==
- "MERCURIO D'ORO" prize.
- FOREIGN TRADE PRIZE, issued by the Milan Chamber of Commerce in 1978. It ranks as the first company in Milan with exports around €80 million in 1972.

== See also ==
- Montecatini
- Corrugated plastic
- Cartonplast®
- Dino Terragni
