= Melt flow index =

Ease of flow of polymer melt

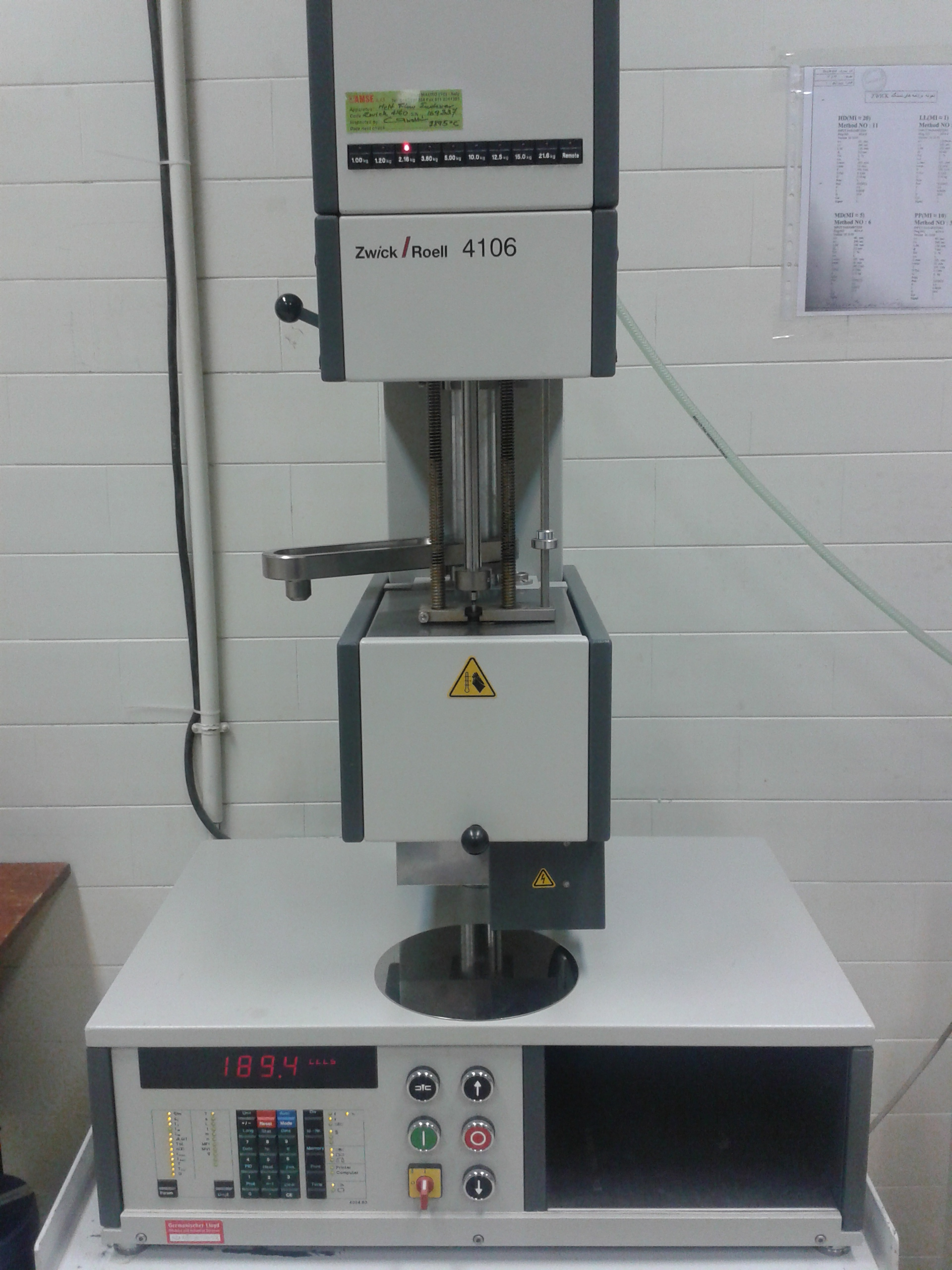
MFI Measuring device

The Melt Flow Index (MFI) is a measure of the ease of flow of the melt of a thermoplastic polymer. It is defined as the mass of polymer, in grams, flowing in ten minutes through a capillary of a specific diameter and length by a pressure applied via prescribed alternative gravimetric weights for alternative prescribed temperatures. Polymer processors usually correlate the value of MFI with the polymer grade that they have to choose for different processes, and most often this value is not accompanied by the units, because it is taken for granted to be g/10min. Similarly, the test conditions of MFI measurement are normally expressed in kilograms rather than any other units. The method is described in the similar standards ASTM D1238 and ISO 1133. To reduce equipment costs an open source hardware-based MFI has been developed and validated on several thermoplastics including polylactic acid, poly(ethylene) terephthalate glycol, and high-density polyethylene/poly(ethylene) terephthalate blends.

Melt flow rate is a measure of the ability of the material's melt to flow under pressure, and is an indirect measure of molecular weight, with high melt flow rate corresponding to low molecular weight. Melt flow rate is inversely proportional to viscosity of the melt at the conditions of the test, though it should be borne in mind that the viscosity for any such material depends on the applied force. Ratios between two melt flow rate values for one material at different gravimetric weights are often used as a measure for the broadness of the molecular weight distribution.

Melt flow rate is very commonly used for polyolefins, polyethylene being measured at 190 °C and polypropylene at 230 °C. The plastics engineer should choose a material with a melt index high enough that the molten polymer can be easily formed into the article intended, but low enough that the mechanical strength of the final article will be sufficient for its use.

== Measurement ==
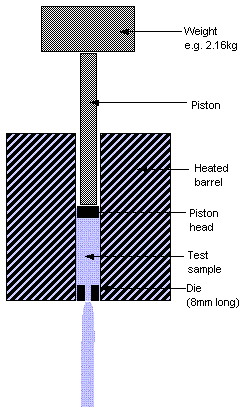
Overview of the measurement of melt flow index (MFI)

ISO standard 1133-1 governs the procedure for measurement of the melt flow rate. The procedure for determining MFI is as follows:

1. A small amount of the polymer sample (around 4 to 5 grams) is taken in the specially designed MFI apparatus. A die with an opening of typically around 2 mm diameter is inserted into the apparatus.
2. The material is packed properly inside the barrel to avoid formation of air pockets.
3. A piston is introduced which acts as the medium that causes extrusion of the molten polymer.
4. The sample is preheated for a specified amount of time: 5 min at 190 °C for polyethylene and 6 min at 230 °C for polypropylene.
5. After the preheating a specified weight is introduced onto the piston. Examples of standard weights are 2.16 kg, 5 kg, etc.
6. The weight exerts a force on the molten polymer and it immediately starts flowing through the die.
7. A sample of the melt is taken after the desired period of time and is weighed accurately.
8. MFI is expressed in grams of polymer per 10 minutes of duration of the test.

Synonyms of Melt Flow Index are Melt Flow Rate and Melt Index. More commonly used are their abbreviations: MFI, MFR and MI.

Confusingly, MFR may also indicate "melt flow ratio", the ratio between two melt flow rates at different gravimetric weights. More accurately, this should be reported as FRR (flow rate ratio), or simply flow ratio. FRR is commonly used as an indication of the way in which rheological behavior is influenced by the molecular weight distribution of the material.

formerly: (MFI = Melt Flow Index) → currently: (MFR = Melt mass-Flow Rate)

formerly: (MVI = Melt Volume Index) → currently: (MVR = Melt Volume-flow Rate)

formerly: (MFR = Melt Flow Ratio) → currently: (FRR = Flow Rate Ratio)

The flow parameter that is readily accessible to most processors is the MFI. MFI is often used to determine how a polymer will process. However, MFI takes no account of the shear, shear rate or shear history and as such is not a good measure of the processing window of a polymer. It is a single-point viscosity measurement at a relatively low shear rate and temperature. Earlier, it was often said that MFI give a ‘dot’ when actually what is needed is a ‘plot’ for the polymer processors. However, this is not true now because of a unique approach developed for estimating the rheogram merely from the knowledge of the MFI.

The MFI device is not an extruder in the conventional polymer processing sense in that there is no screw to compress, heat and shear the polymer. MFI additionally does not take account of long chain branching nor the differences between shear and elongational rheology. Therefore, two polymers with the same MFI will not behave the same under any given processing conditions.

The relationship between MFI and temperature can be used to obtain the activation energies for polymers. The activation energies developed from MFI values has the advantage of simplicity and easy availability. The concept of obtaining activation energy from MFI can be extended to copolymers as well wherein there exists an anomalous temperature dependence of melt viscosity leading to the existence of two distinct values of activation energies for each copolymer.

For a detailed numerical simulation of the melt flow index, see or.

== Melt Flow Index Formula ==
formerly MFI (currently MFR) = Weight (gram) of Melted samples in 10 minutes

Melt Flow Index Tester
