= Cartonplast =

Extruded corrugated plastic

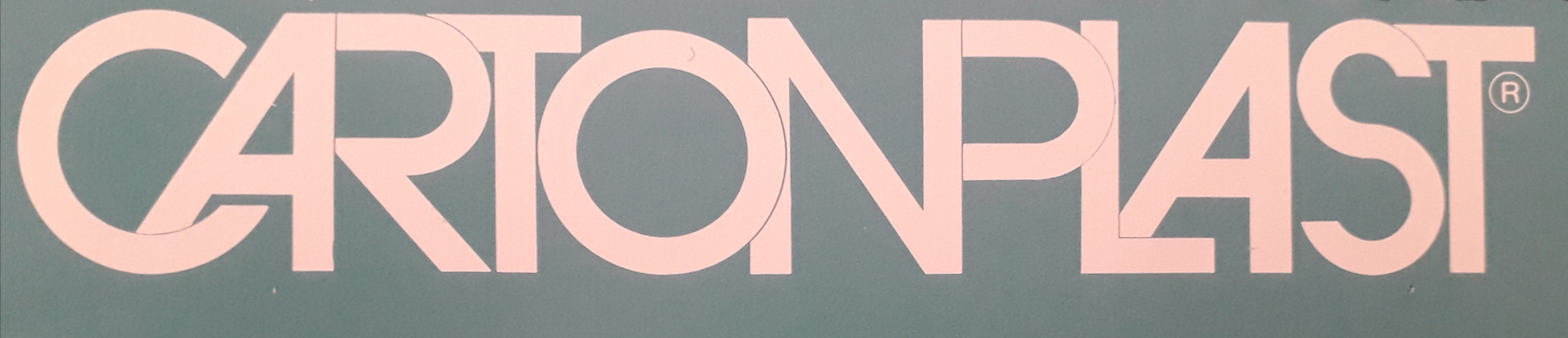
Cartonplast logo

Cartonplast is a trademark that was first given by Covema spa (Italy) in the early seventies to a specific model of extrusion line manufactured and sold world wide by the aforesaid.

In subsequent years such name was used as well to identify the product made by a Cartonplast extrusion line that is to say plastic corrugated sheet as well known as plastic hollow profile sheet or plastic twin wall sheet. The main raw material used to manufacture Cartonplast sheets are PP (polypropylene) and PET (Polyethylene terephthalate).

The Cartonplast extrusion is carried out by using a unique front spinneret plate applied to a flat T-die equipped with restrictor bar (this technology was invented and patented by Marco Terragni during the seventies) to enable using thermoplastic polymers with different MFI (range 0.9 to 3).

== History ==
Marco Terragni started to work on this technology in 1970 with an engineering team of Riap spa and he patented it in 1974. In the year 1991 there was big development of this technology when Y.C. Wang of Formosa Plastics Corp, of Taiwan, was meeting Terragni and discussing with him the foundation of the biggest Cartonplast factory worldwide to be installed in Lolita, Texas. In 1992 Wang and Terragni signed deal for the supply of 15 Cartonplast extrusion lines for the Lolita Plant (Inteplast Group) that still today is manufacturing Cartonplast sheets under the registered trade name of Intepro or Coroplast. Cartonplast extrusion lines are still today manufactured by company Agripak S.r.l of Milan, Italy.

== Cartonplast feature ==
Cartonplast sheets is lightweight (hollow structure), non-toxic, waterproof, shockproof, long-lasting material that resists corrosion. Compared with cardboard, Cortoplast has the advantages of being waterproof and colorfast.

The Cartonplast composition can be altered to add anti-static properties using the masterbatch technique. This particular masterbatch produces a conductive, anti-static plastic hollow board sheet.

== Applications ==
Cartonplast is a lightweight and durable material that is used in the manufacture of reusable plastic boxes, pallet boxes, layer pads, partition walls, facades, beam forms, advertising panels, point-of-sale displays, and other products, including small boats.

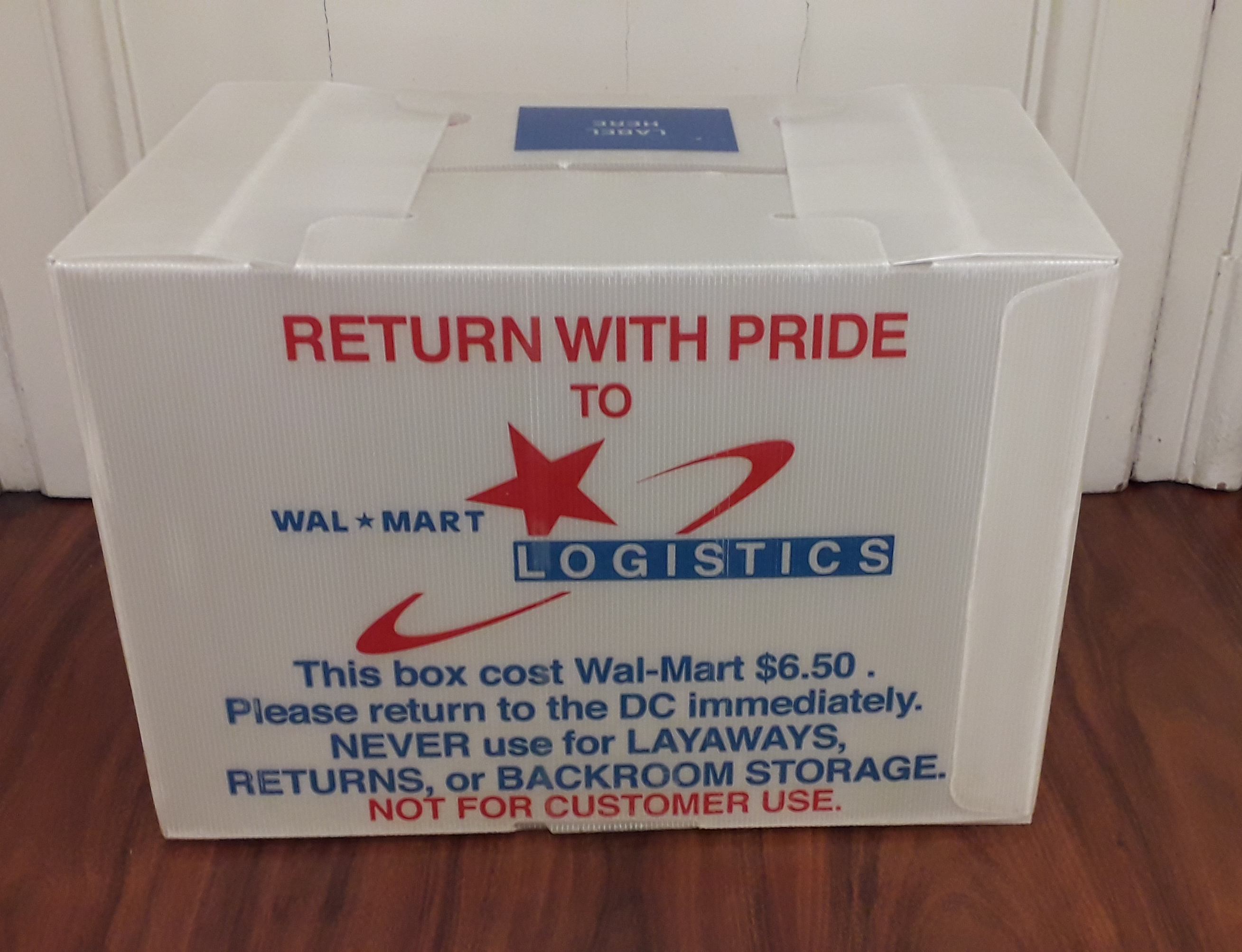
Cartonplast box of Walmart

== Modifying cartonplast sheets ==
Cartonplast sheets can be modified by adding foaming agents, colors, anti UV, antistatic additives and flame retardant.

== See also ==
- Covema
- Corrugated plastic
