= Corrugated plastic =

Range of extruded twinwall plastic-sheet products

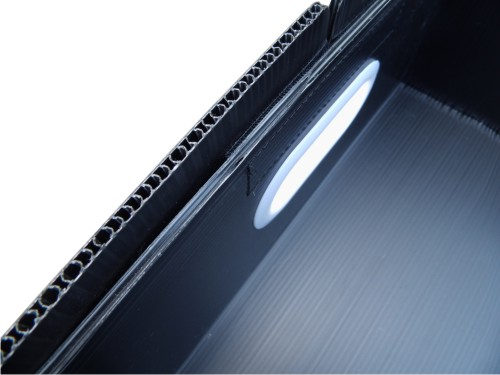
Close-up view of corrugated plastic

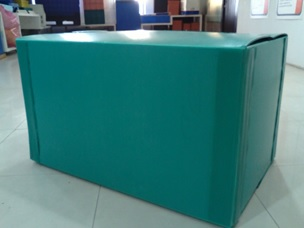
Corrugated plastic box used as reusable packaging

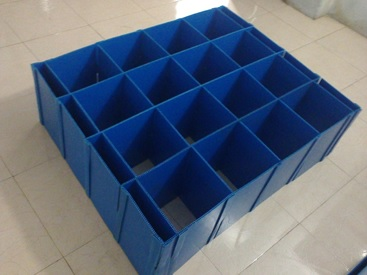
Corrugated plastic dividers used to pack automotive components

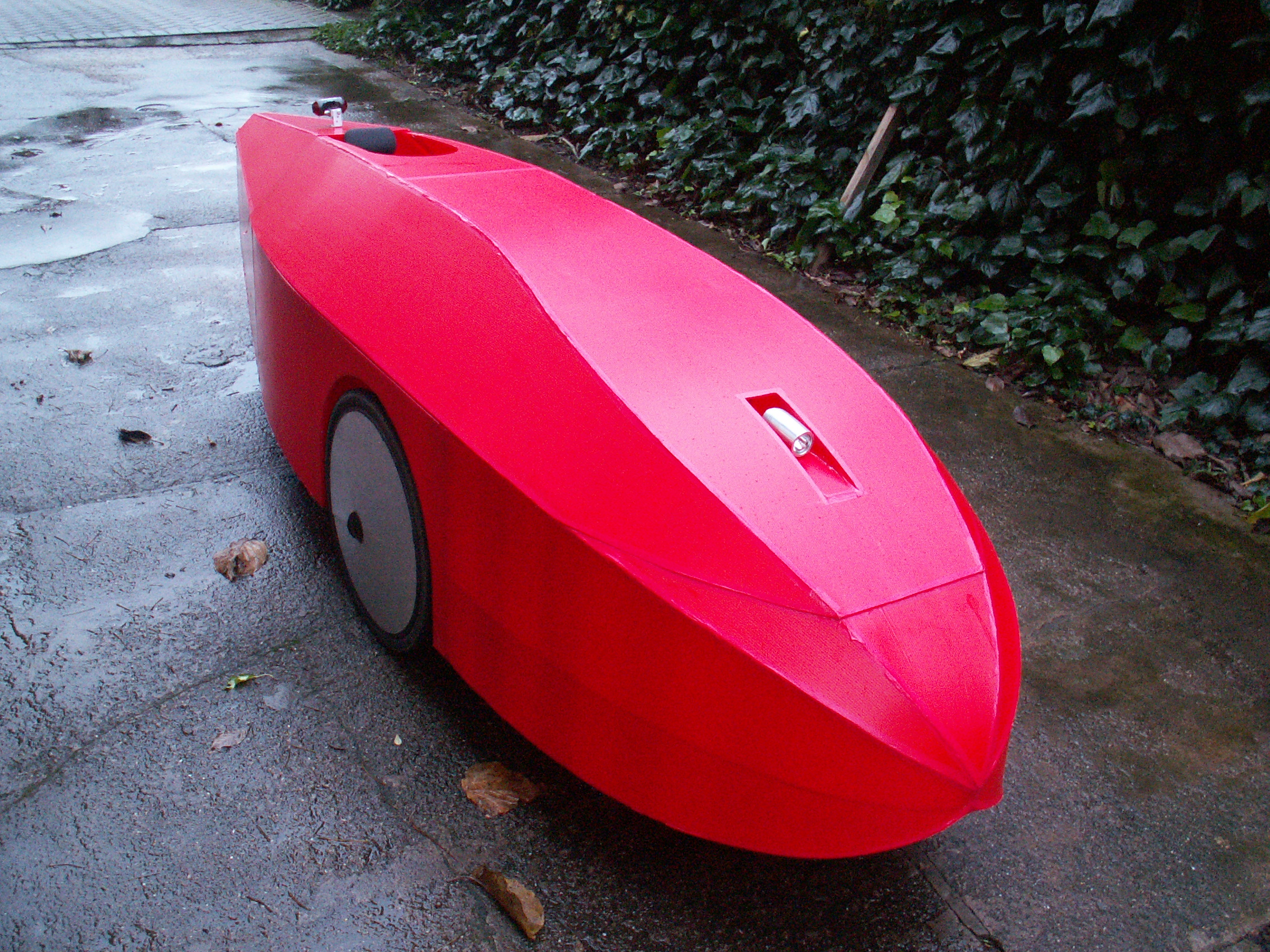
A Velomobile enclosed in corrugated plastic

Corrugated plastic or corriboard — also known under the trade names of Correx, Biplex, Cartonplast, Polyflute, Coroplast, FlutePlast, IntePro, Proplex, Twinplast, Corriflute, and Corflute — refers to a wide range of extruded twin-wall plastic-sheet products produced from high-impact polypropylene resin with a similar make-up to corrugated fiberboard. It is a light-weight tough material that can easily be cut with a utility knife. Manufacturers typically offer a wide variety of colors, thicknesses (quite commonly 3, 4, 5 mm), and weights (measured in grams per square meter).

Chemically, the sheet is inert, with a neutral pH factor. At regular temperatures most oils, solvents and water have no effect, allowing it to perform under adverse weather conditions or as a product component exposed to harsh chemicals. Standard sheets can be modified with additives, which are melt-blended into the sheet to meet specific needs of the end-user. Special products that require additives include ultraviolet protection, anti-static, flame retardant, custom colors, corrosive inhibitors, static-dissipative, among others.

== Applications ==
Corrugated plastic is commonly used to erect commercial, political or other types of signs and for constructing plastic containers and reusable packaging. It is widely used in the signwriting industry for making signs for real estate sales, construction sites and promotions.

The last decade has found its increasing use among guinea pig, rabbit, domesticated hedgehog and other small pet enthusiasts as components of do-it-yourself cages. Additionally, it is used by remote-controlled aircraft enthusiasts to build nearly indestructible SPAD model aircraft.

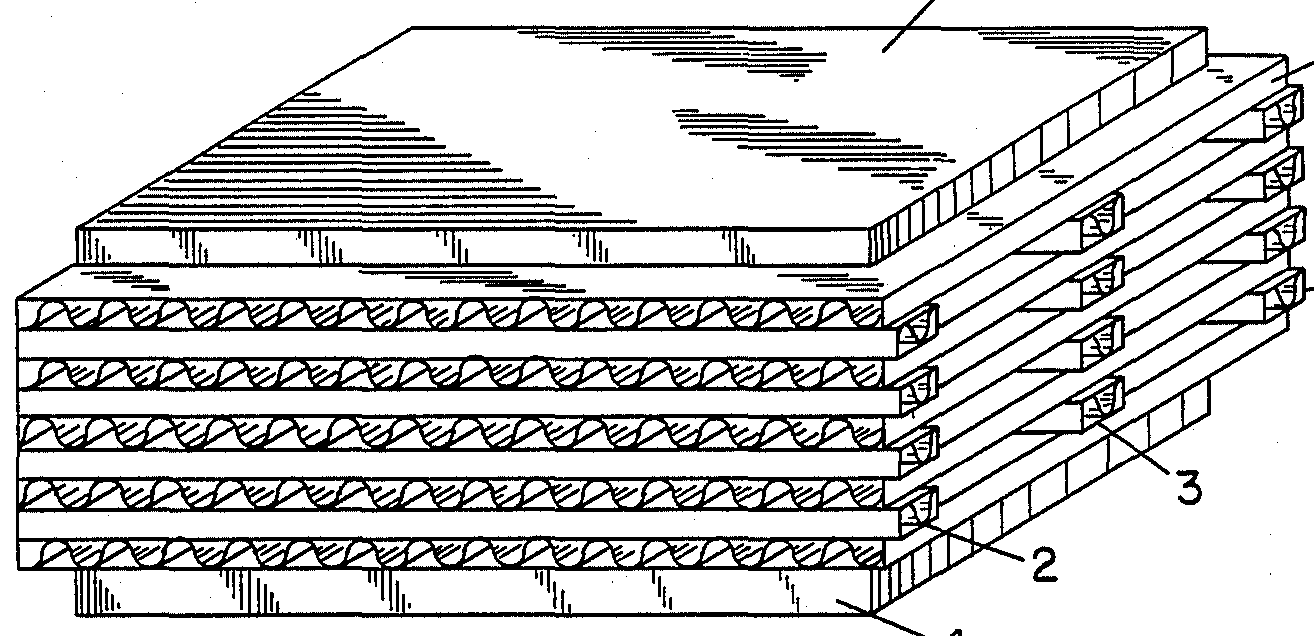
Use of corrugated plastic in welded hollow plastic plate air-to-air heat exchangers. From U.S. patent 4,820,468

At least one manufacturer of air-to-air heat exchangers (used in heat recovery ventilation) uses a fused stack of sheets of this material alternating with spacers made of the same material as the heat-exchange medium. One air stream passes through the corrugated channels in the interior of the sheets, while the other passes between the exterior layers of the stacked sheets.

== Recycling ==
Corrugated plastic is usually made from polypropylene, which can be recycled. Resin identification code 5 applies:.

== See also ==
- Packaging
- Plastic recycling
