= Radio-controlled helicopter =

Model aircraft

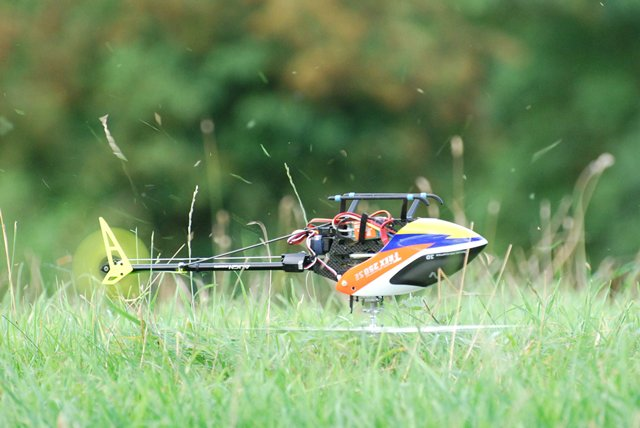
Electric Trex 250 flying inverted

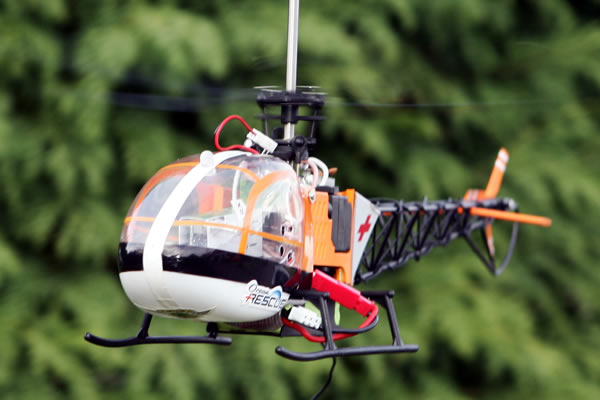
Electric-powered Venom Air Corps Ocean Rescue

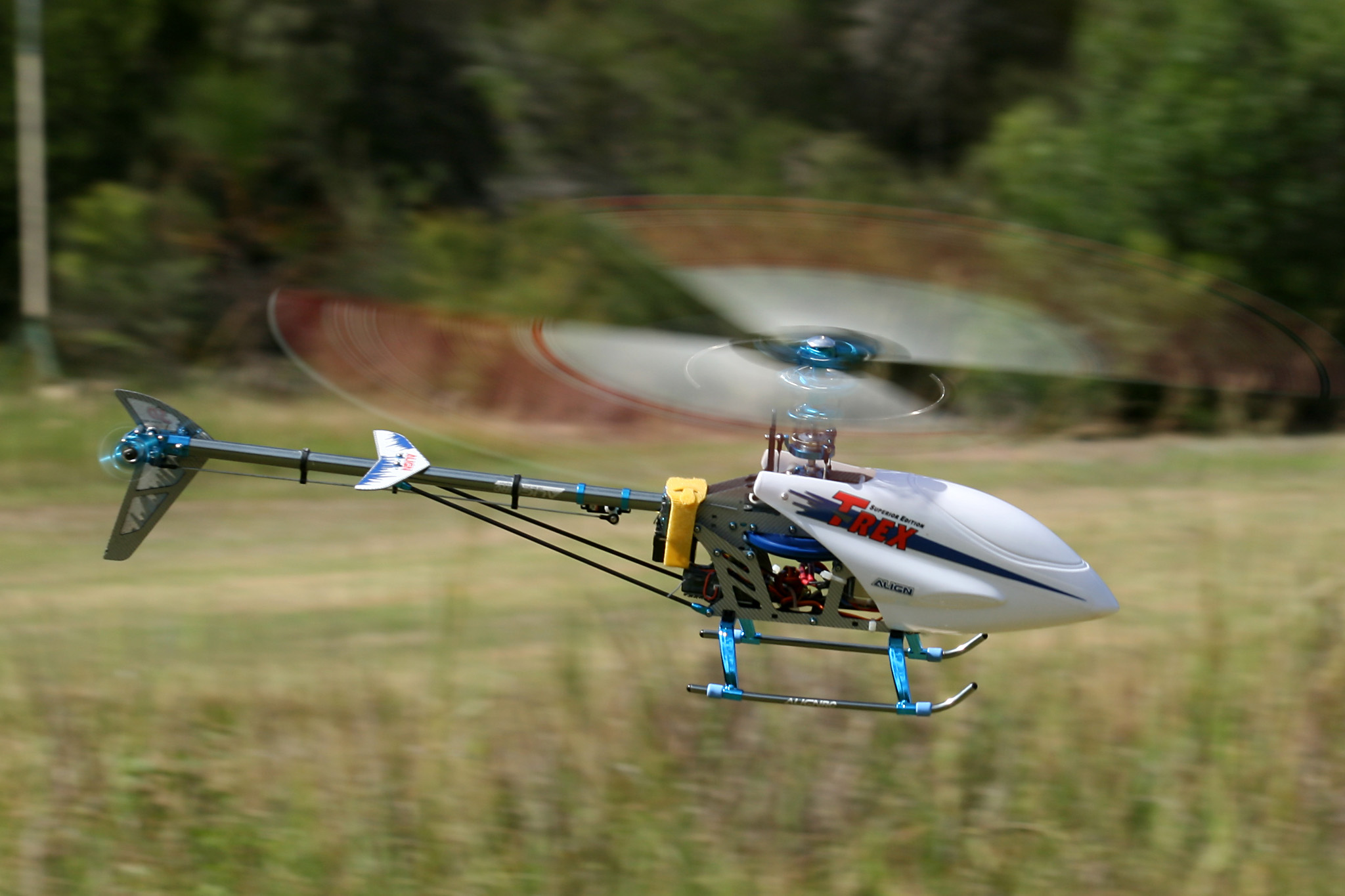
Electric-powered Align T-rex 450SE

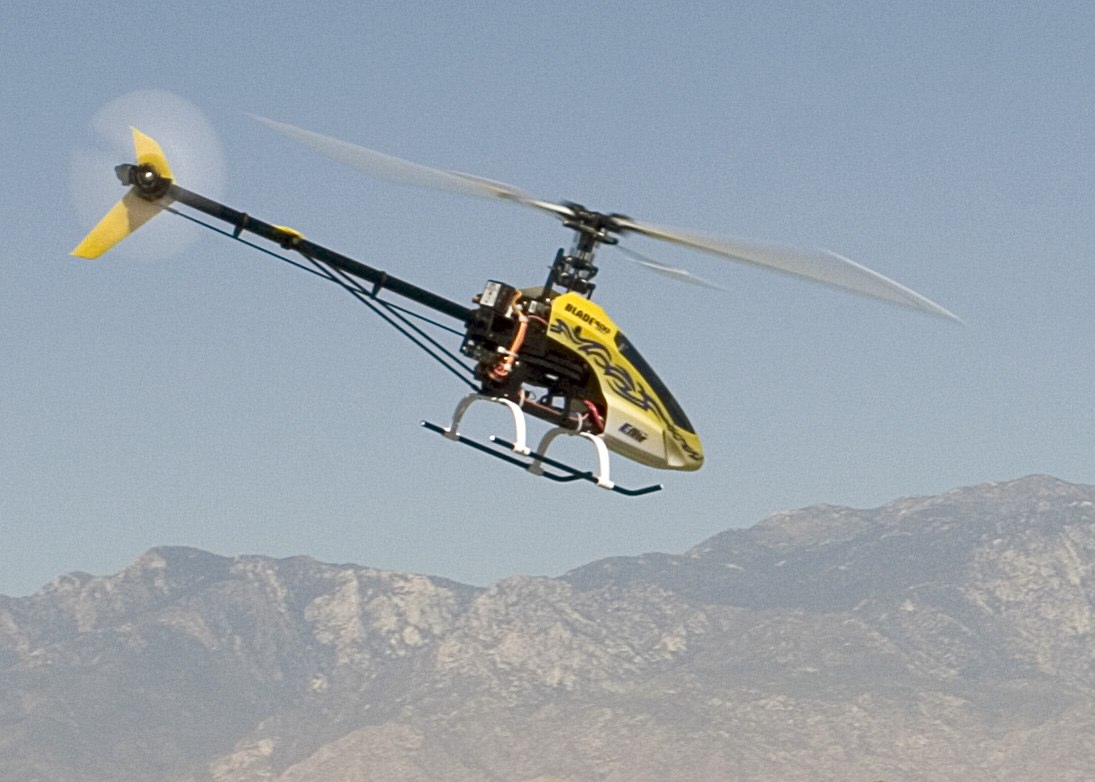
Electric-powered E-flite Blade 400 3D

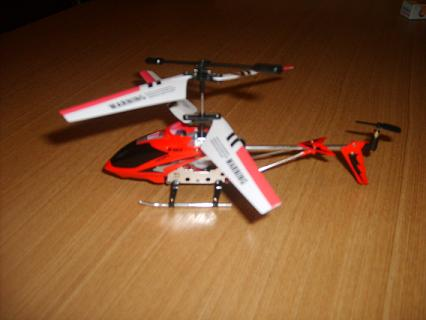
Electric-powered Syma S107

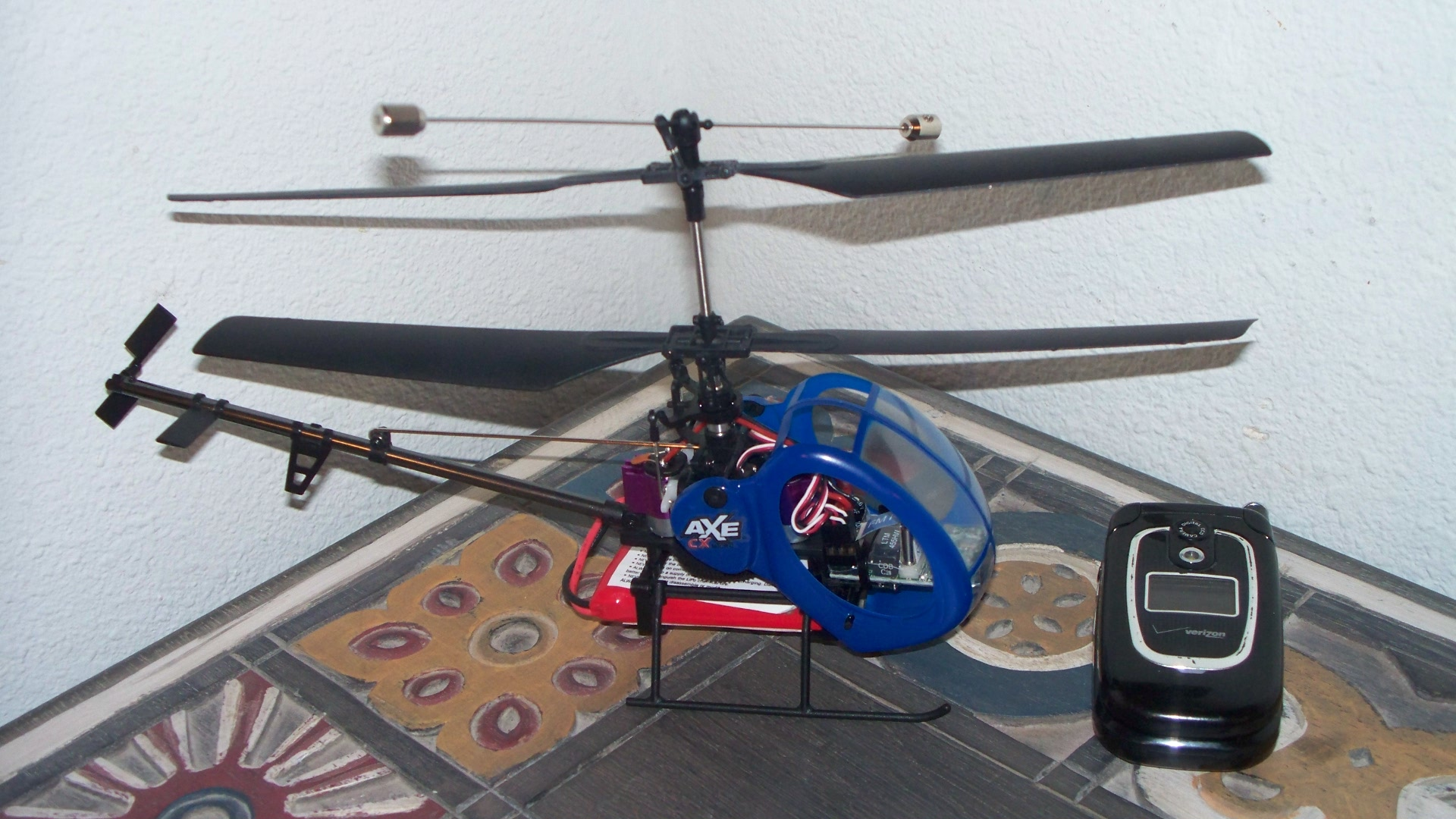
This Heli-Max Axe Micro CX model helicopter is an example of a micro-sized coaxial model. Note the size comparison with the cellular telephone at right.

A radio-controlled (RC) helicopter is a remotely-piloted model helicopter. Several basic designs exist, some of which (such as those with collective pitch control) are more maneuverable than others. The more maneuverable designs are often harder to fly, but benefit from greater aerobatic capabilities.

Flight controls allow pilots to control the collective pitch (or throttle, on fixed pitch helicopters), the cyclic pitch (for control of pitch and roll), and the tail rotor (for yaw). Controlling these in unison enables the helicopter to perform the same maneuvers as full-sized helicopters, such as hovering and backwards flight, and many other maneuvers that full-sized helicopters cannot, such as inverted flight (using negative collective pitch; cyclic pitch must be used in reverse).

The various helicopter controls are affected by means of small servo motors, commonly known as servos. A solid-state gyroscope sensor is typically used on the tail rotor (yaw) control to counter wind- and torque-reaction-induced tail movement. Most newer helicopters have gyro-stabilization on the other 2 axis of rotation (pitch and roll) as well. Such 3-axis gyro is typically called a flybarless controller, so-called because it eliminates the need for a mechanical flybar.

The engines typically used to be methanol-powered two-stroke motors, but electric brushless motors combined with a high-performance lithium polymer battery (LiPo) are now more common and provide improved efficiency, performance, and lifespan compared to brushed motors, while decreasing prices bring them within reach of hobbyists. Gasoline and jet turbine engines are also used.

Just like full sized helicopters, model helicopter rotors turn at high speeds and can cause severe injuries. Several deaths have occurred, some as recently as 2013.

== Types of R/C helicopters ==
Common power sources of remote control helicopters are glow fuel (also called nitro fuel, nitromethane-methanol), electric batteries, gasoline (petrol) and turbine engines. For the first 40 years, glow fuel helicopters were the most common type produced. However, in the last 10 years, electric powered helicopters have matured to a point where power and flight times are better, but typically not as long as glow fuel helicopters.

There have been two main types of systems to control the main rotors, mechanical mixing and electronic cyclic/collective pitch mixing (eCCPM). Most earlier helicopters used mechanical mixing. Today, nearly all R/C helicopter use eCCPM.

Practical electric helicopters are a recent development but have rapidly developed and become more common, overtaking glow fuel helicopters in common use. Turbine helicopters are also increasing in popularity, although the high cost puts them out of reach of most people.

=== Internal Combustion (Nitro, Gas) ===
The first RC helicopters have been powered by combustion engines (Glow fuel, or nitro, as well as gas, or gasoline as the fuel source). Original helicopter "classes" were based on the engine size. For example, a helicopter with a 0.30 cu in (4.9 cm^{3}) engine was a 30 class and a helicopter with a 0.90 cu in (14.7 cm^{3}) engine was referred to as a 90 class helicopter. The bigger and more powerful the engine, the larger the main rotor blade that it can turn and hence the bigger the aircraft overall. Typical flight time for nitro helicopters is 7–15 minutes depending on the engine size and tuning.

=== Electric ===
The 252 km/h fast electric helicopter TDR

Two small electric helicopters emerged in the mid-1990s. These were the Kalt Whisper and the Kyosho EP Concept, flying on 7–8 × 1.2 Ah NiCad batteries with brushed motors. However, the 540-sized brushed-motors were on the limit of current draw, often 20–25 amps on the more powerful motors, hence brush and commutator problems were common.

Recent advancements in battery technology are making electric flying more feasible in terms of flying time. Lithium polymer (LiPo) batteries are able to provide the high current required for high performance aerobatics while still remaining very light. Typical flight times are 4–12 minutes depending on the flying style and battery capacity.

In the past electric helicopters were used mainly indoors due to the small size and lack of fumes. Larger electric helicopters suitable for outdoor flight and advanced aerobatics have become a reality over the last few years and have become very popular. Their quietness has made them very popular for flying sites close to residential areas and in places such as Germany where there are strict noise restrictions. Nitro helicopters have also been converted to electric power by commercial and homemade kits.

The smallest remote-controlled production model helicopter made (Guinness World Records 2014) is the Silverlit Nano Falcon XS sold at many toy stores (although this is infrared controlled, not radio), electronics stores and internet stores, costing about $30 (£28). The next smallest is the Nano Falcon, which previously held the record for the smallest rc helicopter.

Several models are in contention for the title of the smallest non-production remote-controlled helicopter, including the Pixelito family of micro helicopters, the Proxflyer family, and the Micro flying robot.

=== Coaxial ===
A Lama V3 model helicopter, with a simplified coaxial rotor system.

A recent innovation is that of coaxial electric helicopters. The system's simple direction control and freedom from torque induced yaw have, in recent years, made it a good candidate on small models for beginner and/or indoor use. Models of this type, as in the case of a full-scale helicopter, eliminate rotational torque and can have extremely quick control response, both of which are very pronounced in a CCPM model. Most cheaper models do not have a swashplate, but instead use a third rotor on the tail to provide pitch control. These helicopters have no roll control and have limited mobility.

While a coaxial model is very stable and can be flown indoors even in tight quarters, such a helicopter has limited forward speed, especially outdoors. Most models are fixed-pitch, i.e. the collective pitch of the blades cannot be controlled, plus the cyclic control is only applied to the lower rotor. Compensating for even the slightest breeze causes the model to climb rather than to fly forward even with full application of cyclic. More advanced coaxial constructions with two swash plates and/or pitch control (common for full-scale coaxial helicopters like Kamovs) have been realized as models in individual projects but have not seen the mass market as of 2014.

=== Multirotor model helicopters ===
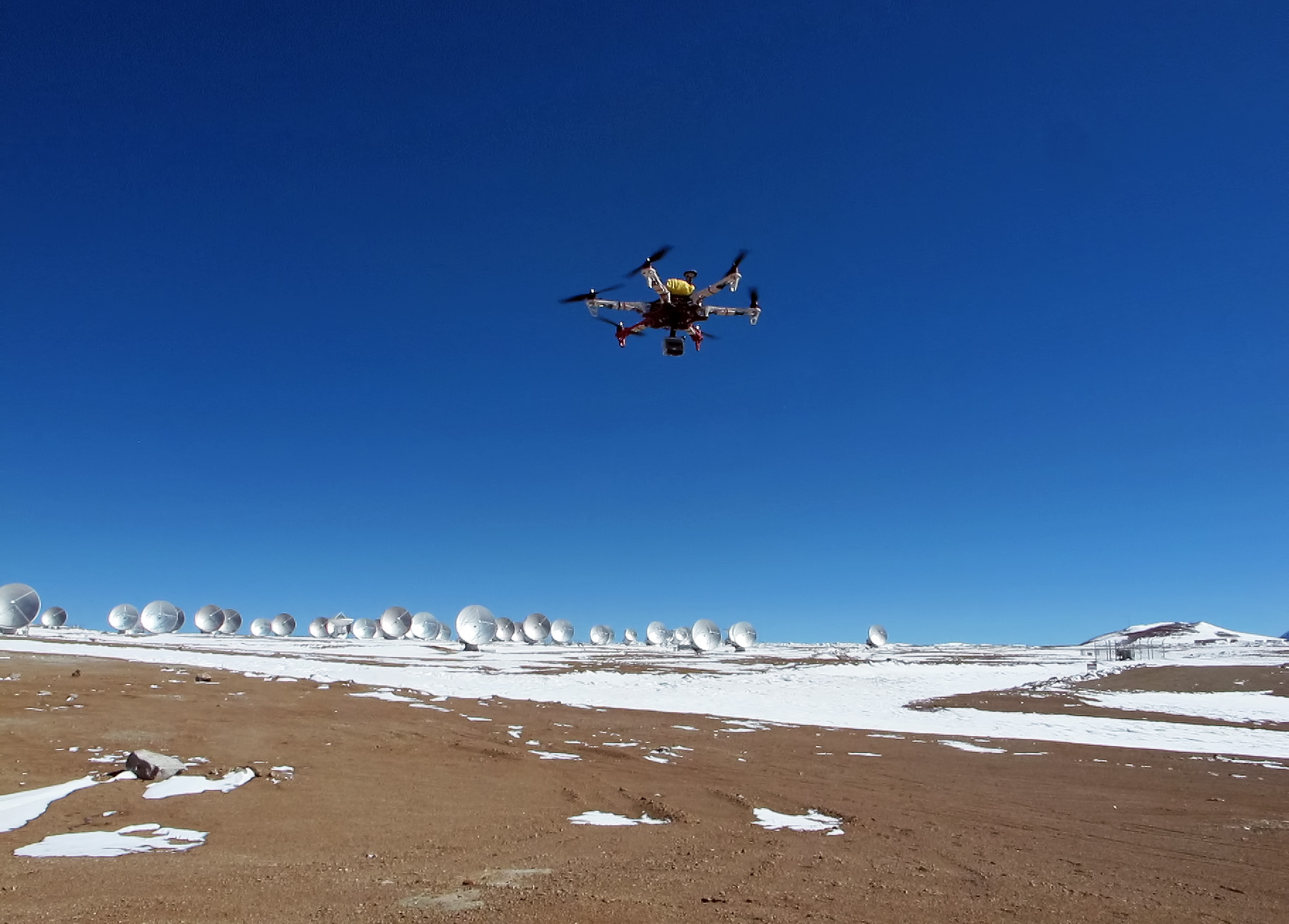
Hexacopter.

More recently, multirotor designs have become popular in both the RC hobby and unmanned aerial vehicle (UAV) research. These vehicles use an electronic control system and electronic sensors to stabilize the aircraft. Multirotors are generally more affordable, easier to construct, and simpler to operate than RC helicopters. This made multirotor aircraft an appealing platform for amateur model aircraft projects and aerial photography.

=== Size classes ===
Nitro RC helicopters are categorised under the following classes:

- 30 size : Engine 0.3 cubic inch, Main Blades 550-600mm
- 50 size : Engine 0.5 cubic inch, Main Blades 600-620mm
- 60 size : Engine 0.6 cubic inch
- 90 size : Engine 0.9 cubic inch, Main Blades 690-710mm

Modern RC helicopters are generally classed by the length of the main blades (with few exceptions). Common classes are:

- Micro (under 200mm main blades)
- Mini (240-420mm blades) - classically called 300–450.
- 500 (425-500mm)
- 600 (600mm)
- 700 (standard competition size)
- 800

== Radio gear ==
=== Transmitter ===
RC helicopters generally require between 3 and 7 channels for control (although micro helicopters that utilize a 2-channel infrared control system also exist). Small fixed-pitch helicopters use a 4-channel radio (throttle, elevator, aileron, rudder); while collective-pitch models need a minimum of 5 channels (throttle, collective pitch, elevator, aileron, and rudder). 6th channel is often used for gyro gain. 7th channel commonly used for engine governor control for fuel powered models. Because of the normal interaction of the various control mechanisms, advanced radios include adjustable mixing functions, such as throttle/collective and throttle/rudder. Radio prices vary from $50–$3,000 USD.

Early radio controls systems used amplitude modulation (AM) to transmit their signals. In the late '70s, frequency modulation (FM) became more commonplace.

=== Spread spectrum ===
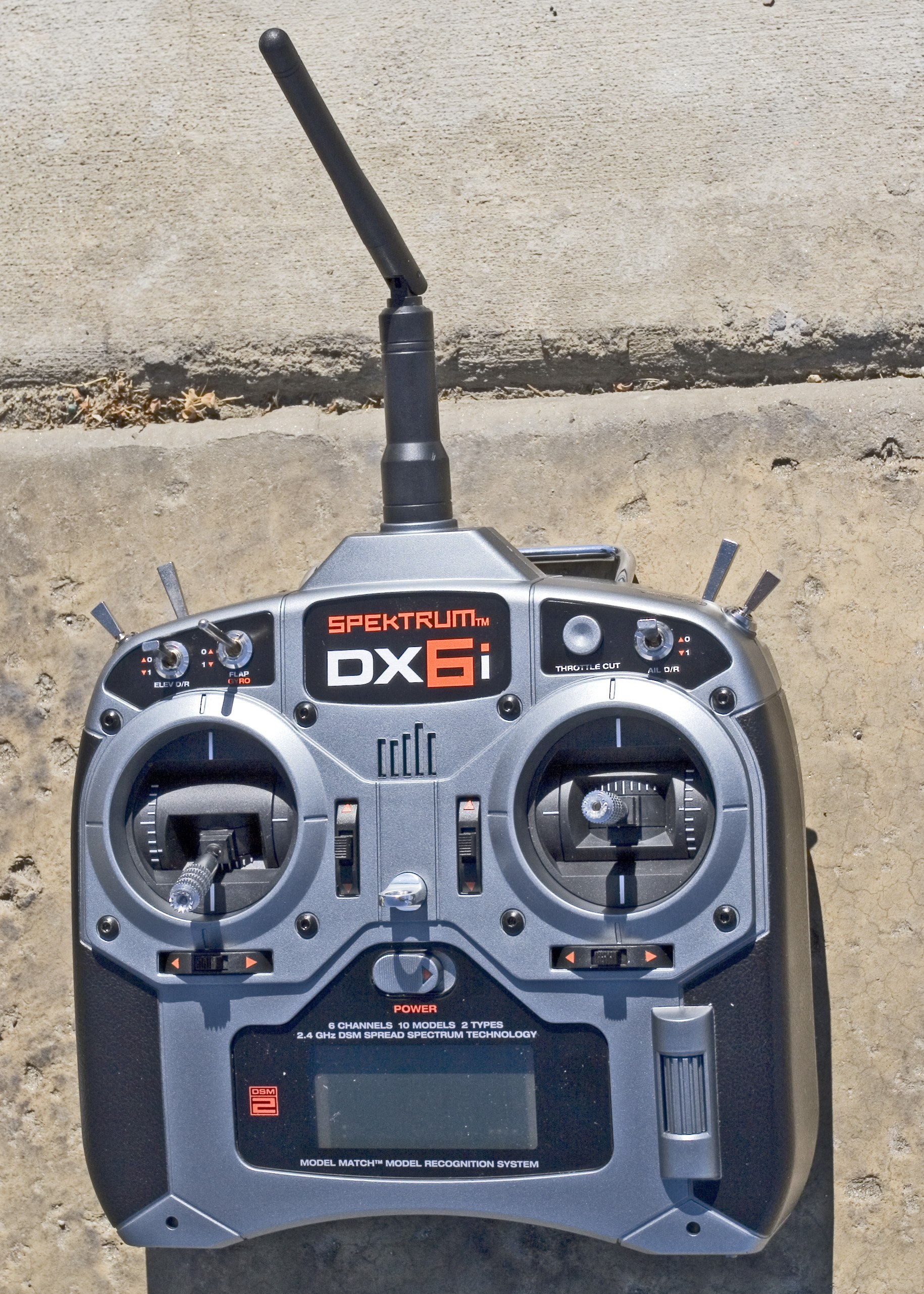
Spektrum DX6i 6-channel spread spectrum computerized aircraft radio which may be used for both helicopters and fixed-wing models

Starting with the Spektrum DX6 park flyer transmitter system in 2006, RC flying began the departure from various lower frequencies which were subject to interference and were less reliable than the new spread spectrum protocols. Systems such as Spektrum and JR use the DSM2 and later, DSMX direct-sequence spread spectrum (DSSS) method, where they transmit on a pair of fixed channels chosen when the radio and receiver are turned on. Any subsequent systems would avoid using these channels and continue searching for another unused pair of channels.

Systems such as frequency-hopping spread spectrum (FHSS) used by Futaba employ frequency hopping on the 2.4 GHz band instead of the various frequencies in the lower MHz ranges. The advantage is that radios are no longer using a fixed frequency during flight, mitigating the risk of interference on that fixed frequency.

With either method many radios can be transmitting at once without interfering with each other. The Futaba systems change frequency approximately every two milliseconds, so even if two transmitters are using the same channel they are not doing so for long. The pilot will not notice any abnormal behavior of the model in the 1/500th of a second that they are interfering. This gives one the advantage of turning on a transmitter without regard to channels currently in use by other pilots' radios.

One downside to 2.4 GHz is that precautions must be taken during installation since certain materials such as carbon fiber can mask the signal. In some cases, satellite receivers with secondary antennas need to be used to maintain better line-of-sight with the transmitter radio. Another drawback is that a 2.4 GHz standard has yet to evolve so that receivers and transmitters can be mixed regardless of their respective manufacturer.

=== Controls ===
Learning to fly a collective pitch RC helicopter takes time and practice. Many modelers join a club so they can be instructed by experienced RC pilots, or follow on-line guides.

RC Helicopters usually have at least four controls: roll - cyclic pitch, elevator (fore-aft cyclic pitch), rudder (yaw) and pitch/throttle (collective pitch/power). For simple flight, the radio is usually configured such that pitch is around −1 degree at 0% throttle stick, and somewhere around 10 degrees at 100% throttle stick. It is also necessary to modulate the throttle in conjunction with the pitch so that the model maintains a constant rotor speed. This is beneficial for consistent and smooth flight performance.

If aerobatic '3D' performance is desired, then automatic throttle, or idle up, mode of flight is used. In this mode, the collective pitch ranges from its negative limit at 0% throttle stick input, up to its positive limit at 100% throttle stick. The throttle, on the other hand, is modulated automatically to maintain a constant rotor speed and is usually at its lowest value when the throttle stick is centered and the pitch is 0. This mode allows the rotor to produce a thrust upwards (by using negative pitch) which, when the model is inverted, allows sustained inverted flight. Usually a more advanced computer radio is used for this kind of flying, which allows customization of the throttle-collective mix.

The cyclic and yaw controls are not by definition different in these two modes, though 3D pilots may configure their models to be much more responsive.

== Construction ==
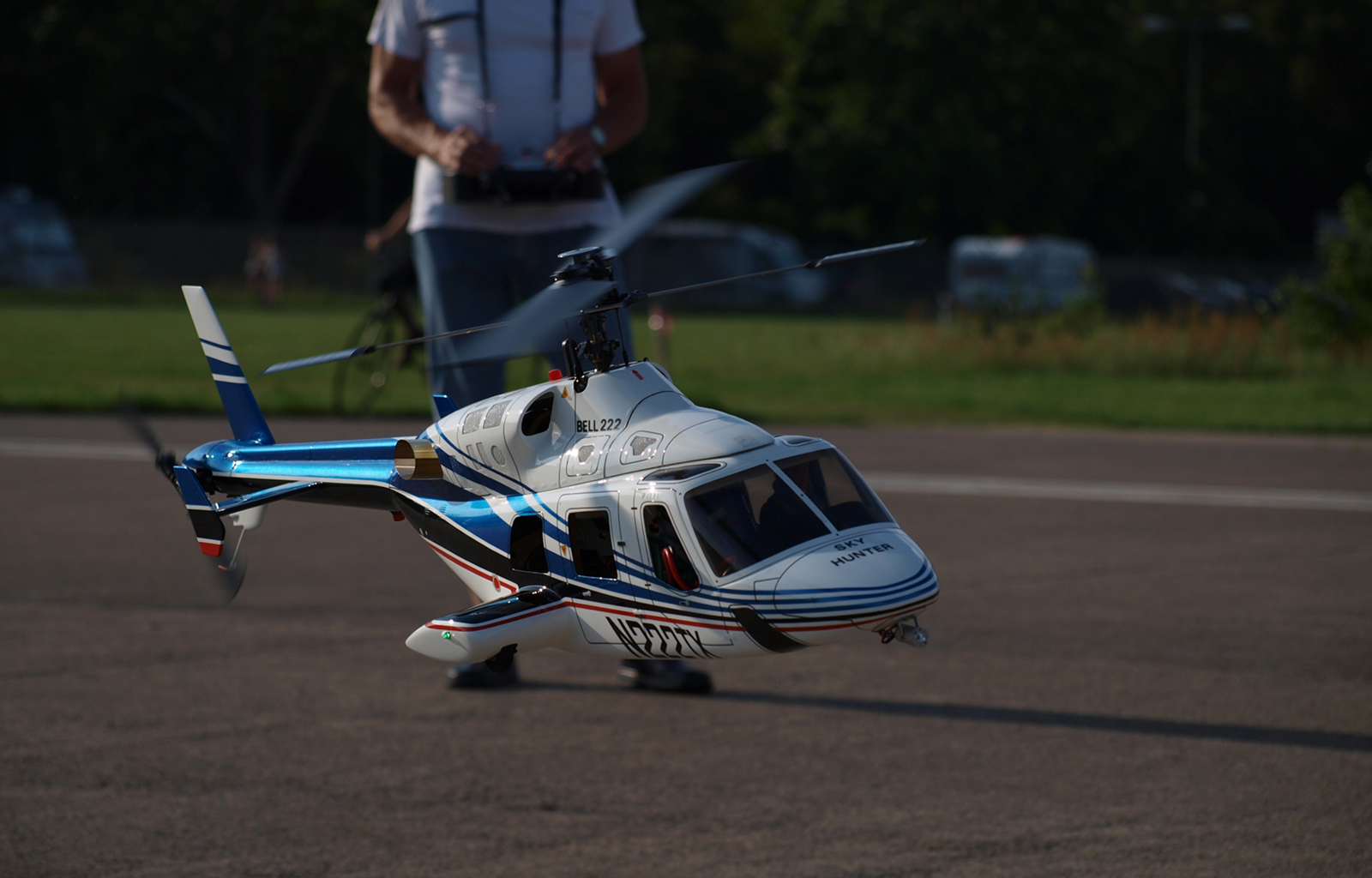
Radio controlled model of a Bell 222 helicopter with pilot.

Construction is typically of plastic, glass-reinforced plastic, aluminium or carbon fiber. Rotor blades are typically made of wood, fiberglass or carbon fiber. Models are typically purchased in kit form from one of about a dozen popular manufacturers and take 5 to 20 hours to completely assemble.

These model helicopters contain many moving parts analogous to those on full-size helicopters, from the swashplate to rotor and everything in between.

The construction of helicopters has to be more precise than for fixed-wing model aircraft, because helicopters are susceptible to even the smallest of vibrations, which can cause problems when the helicopter is in flight.

Additionally, the small size and low weight of R/C helicopters and their components means that control inputs, especially cyclic (pitch and roll) can have a very fast response, and cause a rotation rate much faster than the equivalent input might produce on a full-size aircraft. This quick response can make the model unnecessarily difficult to fly. For this reason, most model helicopters either have a flybar or electronic stabilizing equipment.

To reduce mechanical complexity and increase precision of the control of the swashplate some model helicopters use cyclic/collective pitch mixing.

== Competition ==
Aerobatic helicopter flying has historically followed the Fédération Aéronautique Internationale rules, which for helicopters are labelled F3C. These include a predetermined routine of hovering and aerobatics.

An advanced form of RC helicopter flying is called 3D. During 3D flying, helicopters perform advanced aerobatics, sometimes in a freestyle form, or in a predetermined set of moves drawn up by the organisers of the competition. There are a number of 3D competitions around the world, two of the best-known being the 3D Masters in the UK and the eXtreme Flight Championship (XFC) in the United States.

In 2008, the Fédération Aéronautique Internationale introduced the class of F3N as a provisional class for international 3D competition and in 2010 at the CIAM Plenary meeting, F3N gained formal approval for competition effective 1 January 2011.

F3N rules are designed to provide a consistent standard of judging throughout the World and give countries the chance to field a Team at a World championship hosted every two years. F3N is conducted in a similar manner as 3D Masters and 3DX with 3 round types made up of Set Manoeuvres, Freestyle Flight and Flight to Music.

== Commercial applications ==
While some companies make use of RC multicopters for low altitude aerial photography, filming, policing, and remote observation or inspection, RC helicopters are not commonly used for commercial purposes. One notable exception is crop spraying with large RC helicopters such as the Yamaha R-MAX.

US Federal Aviation Administration regulations from 2006 grounding all commercial RC model and unmanned aerial vehicle (UAV) flights have been upgraded to require formal FAA certification before being permitted to fly at any altitude in the United States. All commercial owners must register with FAA, as well as pass a knowledge test. Non-commercial operators must register only if the models they fly weigh more than 0.55 pounds (250g).

== Controlling methods ==
=== Radio control ===
Most RC helicopters make use of a handheld transmitter with an antenna that sends signals to the helicopter's receiver, usually a radio frequency of 27 MHz, 49 MHz, or 2.4 GHz. Infrared radios are also used by some models. Infrared radios have the disadvantage of potentially being interfered by sunlight or fluorescent lights, making them more suited for indoor RC helicopters.

Radio controls generally have two sticks used to control the movement of the helicopter. On a 4-channel transmitter, there are four different modes in which the control sticks can be set:

- Mode 1 – the left stick controls pitch and yaw movements, while the right stick controls throttle and roll movements.
- Mode 2 – the left stick controls throttle and yaw movements, while the right stick controls pitch and roll movements.
- Mode 3 – the left stick controls pitch and roll movements, while the right stick controls throttle and yaw movements.
- Mode 4 – the left stick controls throttle and roll movements, while the right stick controls pitch and yaw movements.

Transmitters may include trims for each axis to correct any undesired movement of the helicopter.

Some radio transmitters include a charging cable to charge the helicopter's battery using the transmitter's own batteries.

=== Phone and tablet control ===
Some RC Helicopters can be controlled from a smartphone or tablet. Controls are usually via a downloaded application from the helicopter's manufacturer, and often resemble physical stick controls on a transmitter, or utilize the accelerometer built into the mobile device.

Infrared controlled helicopters can be controlled with an IR blaster connected to the 3.5 mm audio jack interface on a mobile device.

Another communications method used is Wi-Fi. The helicopter's built in computer creates its own wireless network, which the Wi-Fi enabled mobile device connects to and communicates with the helicopter.

== Safety ==
'Model' helicopters can be dangerous. Safety precautions, proper maintenance, and an understanding of the mechanics and flight characteristics of the models are necessary to prevent accidents. Modelers who fly at sanctioned sites are required to follow safety rules designated by national model aircraft organizations. In the United States, the Academy of Model Aeronautics (AMA) publishes and updates safety rules for all model aircraft operations, including fixed and rotary wing models. In 2014, several organizations with interest in unmanned aircraft systems in partnership with the Federal Aviation Administration launched a new educational campaign to promote safe and responsible flying and provide guidance for hobbyists and commercial users.

=== Deaths ===
In July 2013, a 41-year-old Swiss man was found dead in Mauensee near his model helicopter. He had "severe head and arm injuries".

A September 2013 incident in New York City highlighted the possible dangers of remote controlled model helicopters when a 19-year-old enthusiast, who was very experienced in flying remote controlled helicopters, died after one of his helicopter's blades struck his head.

== Miniature helicopters ==
Miniature helicopters are remotely controlled helicopters with a weight ranging from just a few grams to one hundred grams. Most in production are toys aimed at hobbyists and enthusiasts. In addition, there are many companies making prototypes for military and security applications. Miniature helicopters are popular demonstrations for the latest technologies in miniaturization.

Examples of these types of miniaturized models are the E-Flite Blade CX and CX2 and the Picoo Z, a popular consumer model. Along with the Proxflyer, a prototype and basis for many production models. One final example is a one-off prototype and technology demonstration item that was developed by Seiko Epson, and demonstrated at the International Robot Exhibition in Tokyo is the Seiko Epson Micro flying robot.

== See also ==
- Radio-controlled aerobatics
- Radio-controlled model
- IRCHA
