= Proxflyer =

Proxflyer refers to a family of micro R/C helicopter prototypes based on a dual coaxial counter-rotating rotor concept developed and patented by Norwegian Petter Muren. The concept differs from the swashplate designs in conventional helicopter flight controls and enables a helicopter to be passively stable in hover. Elimination of the conventional cyclic and collective pitch controls allows for simpler and lighter helicopters to be developed. A helicopter based on this design achieves stability without the use of gyroscopes or any form of active stabilization and thus is made up of much fewer parts than other model helicopters. The two counter-rotating rotors keep the helicopter very stable relative to the surrounding air. Altitude control is performed by varying the speed for both main rotors while Yaw control is achieved by increasing the speed of one rotor and reducing the speed of the other rotor by the same amount. A horizontally oriented tail rotor controls the helicopter’s forward or backward movement by shifting its center of lift with respect to the center of gravity (CG).

== Features and function ==
The Proxflyer co-axial rotor system utilize the combination of 3 features to achieve passive stability:

- The typically 4-bladed rotor has a generally fixed geometry and it is tiltably connected to the rotor shaft enabling the rotor to tilt almost freely in any direction.
- Furthermore, the outer parts of the rotor blades have a pitch angle that is fixed relative to the rotational plane of the rotor (the tips are fixed to a ring encircling the rotor).
- Finally the inner part of the rotor blades have a pitch angle fixed relative to a reference plane perpendicular to the rotor shaft (to be able to do this the blades are flexible and can twist in the longitudinal direction).

This combination of features enables the rotor to respond to aerodynamic forces and tilt in any direction without introducing mechanical bending forces between the rotor and the rotor shaft. At the same time it is possible to control the rotor by tilting the rotor shaft (helicopter) in the desired direction of flight. The forward speed is however limited because the rotors have a high tendency to tilt up to counteract any horizontal movement. The rotors increased tilting tendency is an important part of achieving passive stability but it at the same time makes it almost impossible to use this rotor system in a helicopter flying in anything but calm weather. The Proxflyer rotor system is designed for indoor use only and it is claimed to be the rotor system that enables the most stable yet controllable indoor helicopters.

The main benefits are believed to be:

- Passively stable
- Simple electronics without any - Relative simple mechanics
- High efficiency
- Very low noise level

The main limitations are:

- Relative slow forward speed
- Not possible to operate in wind (outdoors)

== Proxflyer Prototypes ==
Description	Size	Weight	Flight Duration	Radio Control	First Flight
Mosquito Twin-Tail	Rotor Dia. 360 mm	130 grams	20 mins	4 Channel	22 Jul 2004
Mosquito	Rotor Dia. 360 mm	110 grams	30 mins	3 Channel	1 Feb 2003
Microflyer	Rotor Dia. 128 mm	7.8 grams	10 mins	3 Channel; uses 2	10 Nov 2003
Nanoflyer []	Rotor Dia. 85 mm	2.7 grams	10 mins	2 Channel IR	4 Sep 2004
Picoflyer	Rotor Dia. 60 mm	3.3 grams	1 min	3 Channel	7 Aug 2005

== Commercial products ==
The helicopters shown above are one-off prototypes built by Petter Muren. None of these helicopters are for sale, however, the Proxflyer rotor system is licensed to Interactive Toy Concepts. The company’s R/C helicopters, which include Bladerunner and Micro Mosquito, are all based on the Proxflyer rotor design. The Bladerunner is considered by some to be the first successful indoor R/C helicopter. Up until the beginning of 2007, the total number of toy helicopters produced using the Proxflyer rotor system is estimated to be about one million. Helicopters utilizing the Proxflyer rotor system are also used in some science projects around the world. Petter Muren's designs were showcased as part of the 1st US-European MAV event in Garmisch Germany (MAV-05).

== See also ==
- Radio-controlled helicopter
- Picoo Z
