= Andy Lennon =

Model aircraft designer (1914–2007)

Andy Lennon (September 1, 1914 - November 24, 2007) is most notably associated with his work in advanced model aircraft design.

== Background ==
Lennon was involved in aviation since the age of 15, when he went for a short ride in a Curtiss Robin. He soon joined the Montreal Flying Club and began flying D.H. Gypsy Moths and early two-place Aeronca cabin monoplanes. He was educated in Canada at Edward VII School, Strathcona Academy, Montreal Technical School, McGill University and the University of Western Ontario, (London, Ontario).

== Involvement in manufacturing ==
Lennon entered the Canadian aircraft manufacturing industry and later moved to general manufacturing as an industrial engineer. Throughout his career, he continued to study aeronautics, particularly aircraft design, aviation texts, NACA and NASA reports and aviation periodicals. He tested many aeronautics theories by designing, building and flying nearly 25 experimental R/C models-miniatures of potential light aircraft. One model, the Seagull III was a flying boat with wide aerobatic capabilities. Lennon was a licensed pilot in the United States and Canada.

== Contributions in literature ==
Lennon was a contributing editor to Model Airplane News, Model Aviation, Model Builder, RC Modeler, Fly RC and RC Models and Electronics. He wrote several books: "Basics of R/C Model Aircraft Design", "R/C Model Airplane Design" and "Canard: A Revolution in Flight." His last book was published in 1996, has been reprinted twice since. Andy's authority in aerodynamics and related studies are well acknowledged by leaders in the aviation industry. His book "Canard: A Revolution in Flight" had the foreword written by Burt Rutan, a fitting authority in Canard design. For his last book "Basics of R/C Model Aircraft Design", Bob Kress, who designed the F-14, among other designs, wrote the introduction.

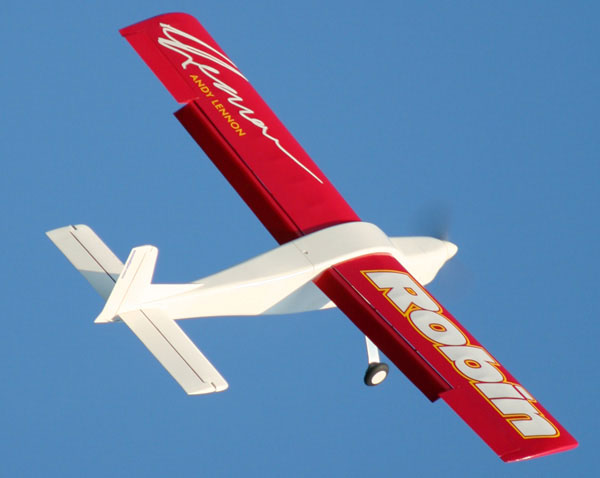
Note the traditional profile found in many of Andy's designs.

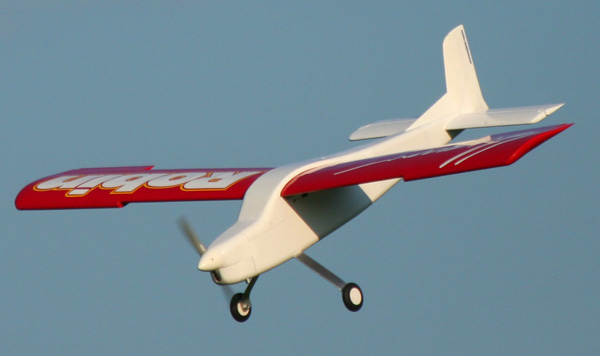
Andy Lennon's Robin shown in kit form.

== Model design development ==
Lennon, beginning in 1957, designed and published a wide range of model aircraft in various publications. These designs each represented features specific to that particular plane. The current list of his published designs is as follows, in order of publication:

Model Airplane News
Oct. 1957: Flamingo Flying Boat
Sept. 1980: Elseven - Sport (pronounced EL-Seven)
Jan. 1981: Canada Goose Canard
March/April 1983: Crane STOL
July 1984: Gull Sport
Oct. 1992: Sea Hawk - Float & Land Plane
Sept. 1993: Swift - Sport
Nov. 1994: Dove - Glo Powered Glider
Jan. 1996: Wild Goose - 3 Surface Model
Aug. 1996: Crow STOL
May 2000: Robin STOL

Model Aviation, USA
Jan. 1987: Sparrow Hawk - Sport
Oct. 1987: Sea Loon - Twin Boom Flying Boat

Model Builder, USA
Oct. 1989: Swan - Canard
June 1991: Osprey - Float & Land Plane

R.C. Modeler, USA
Jan. 1989: Snowy Owl Sport
Oct. 1992: Seagull III - Flying Boat

Radio Control Models & Electronics, UK
Feb. 1998: Wasp - Tandem Wing Biplane

Although all designs are dear to Andy, he has noted that [the] "Robin and the Seagull III, are both my favourites."
Lennon's last design was the Robin. (officially)

Unsurprisingly, the majority of Mr. Lennon's unpublished designs are preserved in the hands of Ken Charron, principal designer who Andy collaborated with in the development and release of the "Robin" kit — the only known design of Andy Lennon's to be produced in [kit] form.
