= CyberTech =

CyberTech Corporation
- Native name: 株式会社サイバーテック
- Type: Private company (Kabushiki gaisha)
- Industry: Information and communications
- Founded: September 8, 1998; 28 years ago
- Headquarters: Osawa Bldg. 5F, 1-20-1 Dogenzaka, Shibuya, Tokyo, Japan
- Key people: Kenji Hashimoto (President and Representative Director)
- Services: Manual DX; DXP Solutions; Professional Services
- Website: www.cybertech.co.jp

CyberTech Corporation (株式会社サイバーテック, Kabushiki-gaisha Saibātekku) is a Japanese software company headquartered in Shibuya, Tokyo. Founded in 1998, the company provides services related to manuals, document and content management, web-related services, and software development.

CyberTech operates the Cebu R&D Center in Cebu, Philippines, and CyberTech Okinawa in Okinawa Prefecture.

== History ==
CyberTech was established on September 8, 1998.

In September 2003, Weekly BCN reported that Cybertech had established a new "Solution Business Promotion Department" as part of its effort to shift away from a business model centered on contract development.

In the early 2000s, the company pursued software development using overseas software companies. In 2003, Nihon Keizai Shimbun reported that CyberTech planned to establish an exclusive development arrangement with a software company in Shanghai.

In 2005, Weekly BCN described CyberTech's main businesses as packaged software, ASP services, and contract software development. The company outsourced development to Chinese companies and was also considering development outsourcing in the Philippines.

In the same year, CyberTech acquired the product business for Sonic XIS from the United States-based Sonic Software. @IT reported that CyberTech had already been engaged in XML-related contract development and planned to develop, sell, and support the XML database product itself.

In 2006, CyberTech established its own development center in Cebu, Philippines. According to the Japan External Trade Organization (JETRO), after conducting offshore development projects in Shanghai and pilot projects in Cebu, CyberTech selected Cebu as its offshore development base.

Weekly BCN also reported on the opening of the development center.

In 2007, CyberTech acquired from Mitsui Bussan Secure Directions the exclusive Japanese distributor business for NeoCoreXMS, an XML database developed by the U.S. company Xpriori. The acquisition was also reported by Nikkan Kogyo Shimbun.

== XML database and document management ==
From the mid-2000s onward, XML databases became one of CyberTech's major technology fields. The company received the source code and related technologies for Sonic XIS and continued its in-house development.

In 2007, CyberTech acquired the Japanese distributor business for NeoCoreXMS.

In 2012, Weekly BCN, citing research by Fuji Keizai, described CyberTech as having the No. 1 share of the domestic XML database management system market. The article also reported that CyberTech focused on printing, publishing, and document management rather than directly competing with relational databases.

In 2013, Weekly BCN reported that CyberTech was using XML databases for document management.

== Offshore development ==
CyberTech has conducted offshore development activities since the 2000s. In 2003, Nihon Keizai Shimbun reported that the company planned to enter into an exclusive development contract with a software company in Shanghai, China.

In 2005, the company outsourced software development to Chinese companies and subsequently conducted pilot projects with multiple companies in Cebu.

According to JETRO, CyberTech established its own development center in Cebu City in 2006 and had approximately 20 engineers as of June of that year.

Weekly BCN reported in 2006 that CyberTech had opened its Cebu development center and planned to use it for XML system development and offshore development.

In 2012, Weekly BCN reported that CyberTech had launched a contract development service combining operations in Japan with development in Cebu.

In 2019, Asia Market Review published an interview with CyberTech's president, Hashimoto, covering why the company withdrew from offshore development in China, why it chose the Philippines as its next destination, and how it recruits talent and manages operations at its Cebu base.

In 2024, New Leader featured CyberTech's Cebu base in an article on the IT and BPO industries in the Philippines, covering the company's experience with development operations in China, a comparison of candidate countries for expansion, and its recruitment, training, and operations in the Philippines.

== Current business ==
As of 2026, CyberTech's businesses consist of the Manual DX business, the DXP Solutions business, and the Professional Services business.

=== Manual DX ===
The Manual DX business provides production and management services for manuals and technical documents, as well as software and services for structured documents.

=== DXP Solutions ===
The DXP Solutions business provides document and content publishing systems, Web CMS, and web services.

=== Professional services ===
The Professional Services business provides software development, data structuring and migration, and website operation services.
