= West Delray Regional Park =

Park in Florida, United States

Coordinates: 26°27′37″N 80°13′00″W

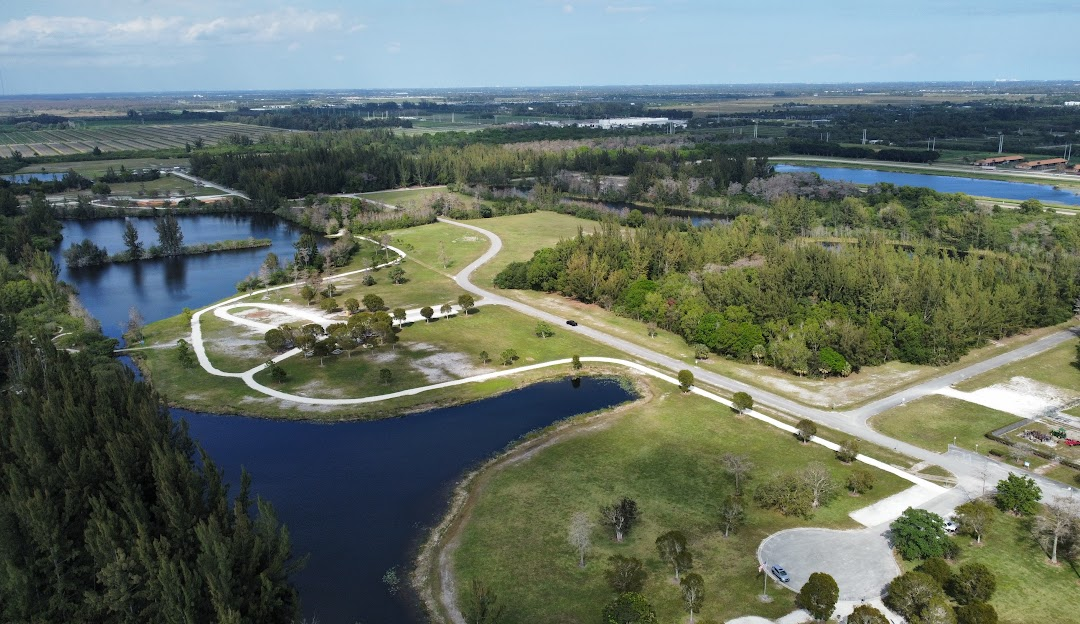
- Type: Regional park
- Location: Delray Beach, Florida
- Area: 313 acres (127 ha)
- Opened: October 19, 2007
- Paths: Hiking path, mountain-biking trail
- Website: https://discover.pbc.gov/parks/Locations/West-Delray-Regional.aspx

West Delray Regional Park is a park located in Delray Beach, Palm Beach County, in the U.S. state of Florida.

It offers various activities, such as 7 miles of mountain-biking trails, a long disc golf course, an RC car racing track, an RC helicopter launchpad, and an RC airplane runway. Its main feature is the mountain-bike trail, with many features and jumps.

The park was opened on October 19, 2007.

It borders the Florida Everglades, an extensive swamp in the center of South Florida.
