= Picoo Z =

Toy helicopter

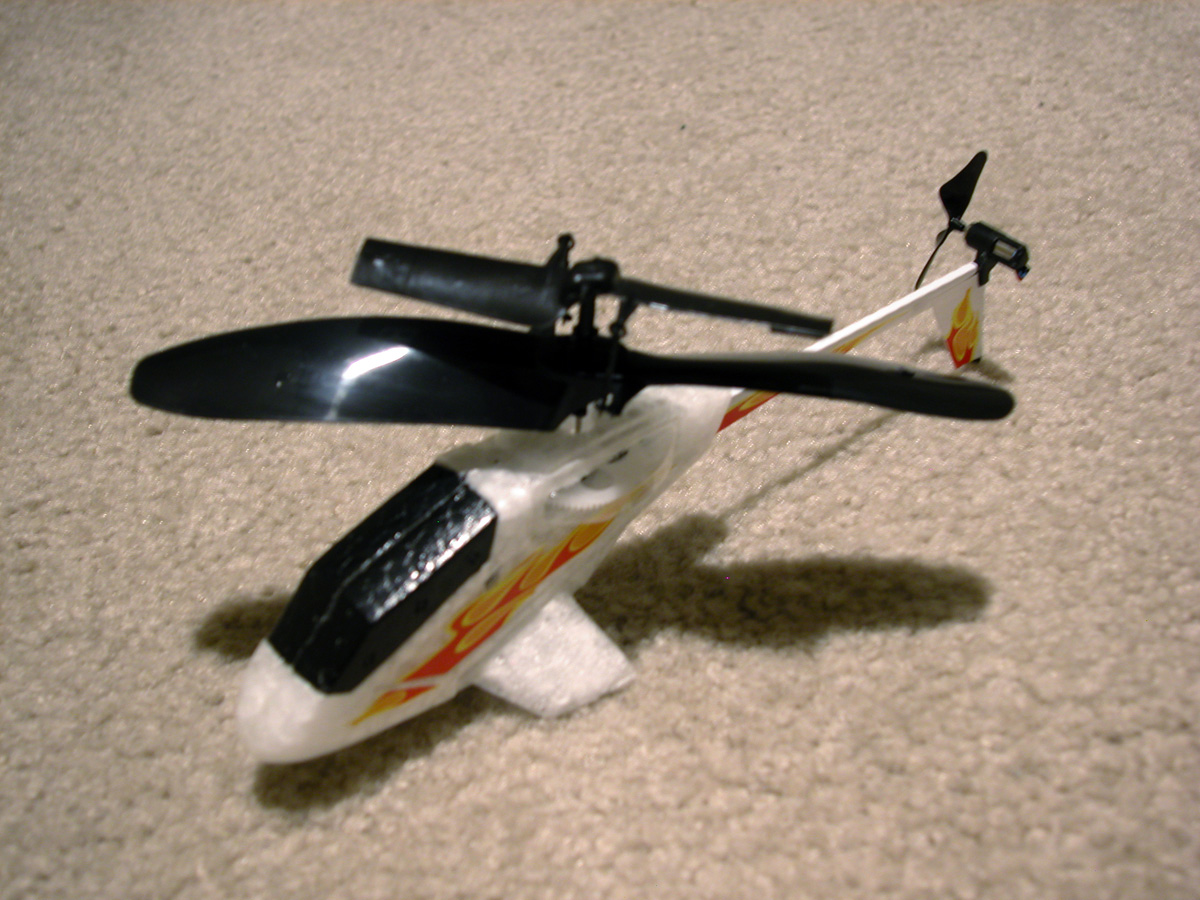
Front view of the Picoo Z.

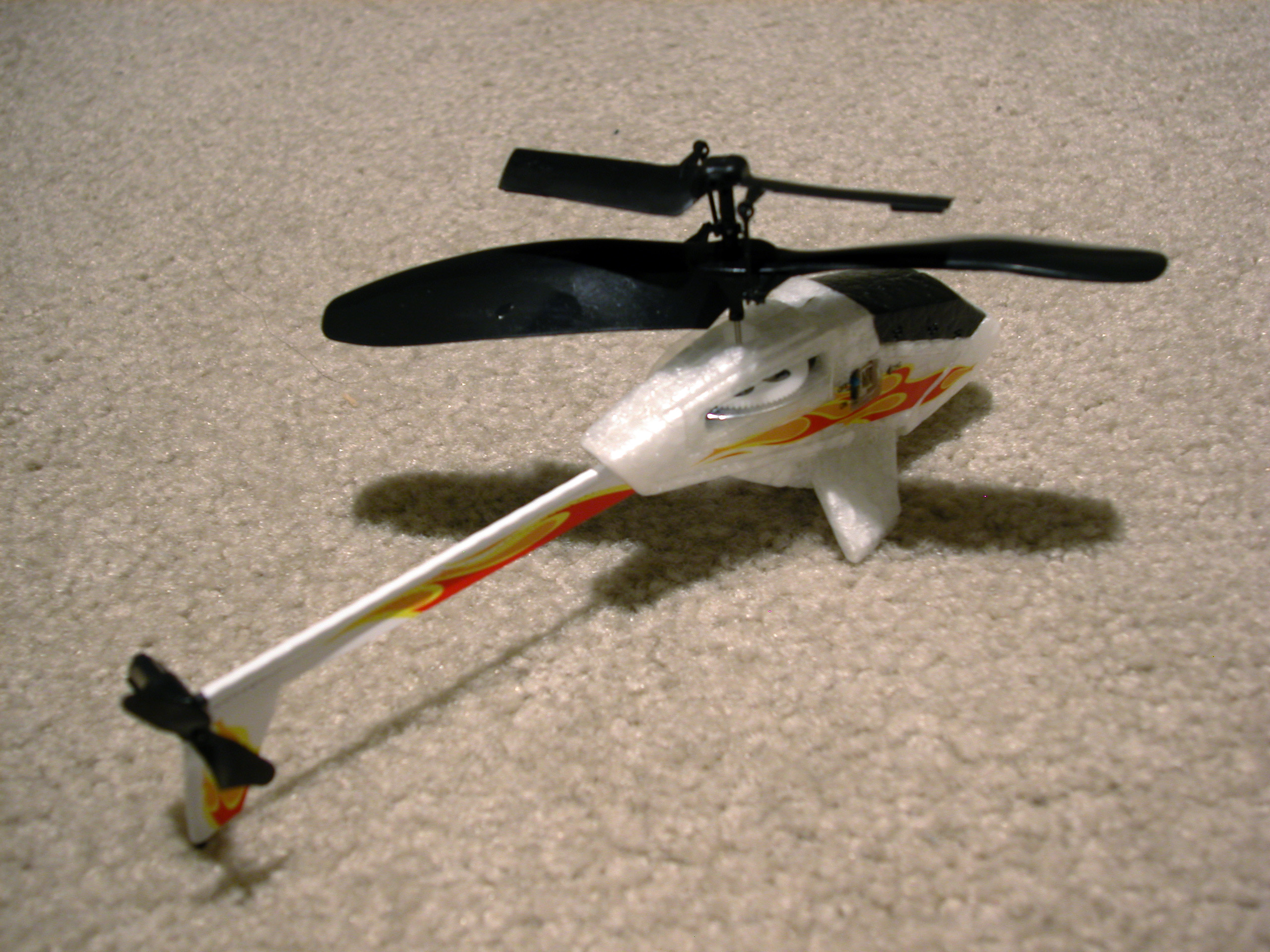
Rear view of the Picoo Z.

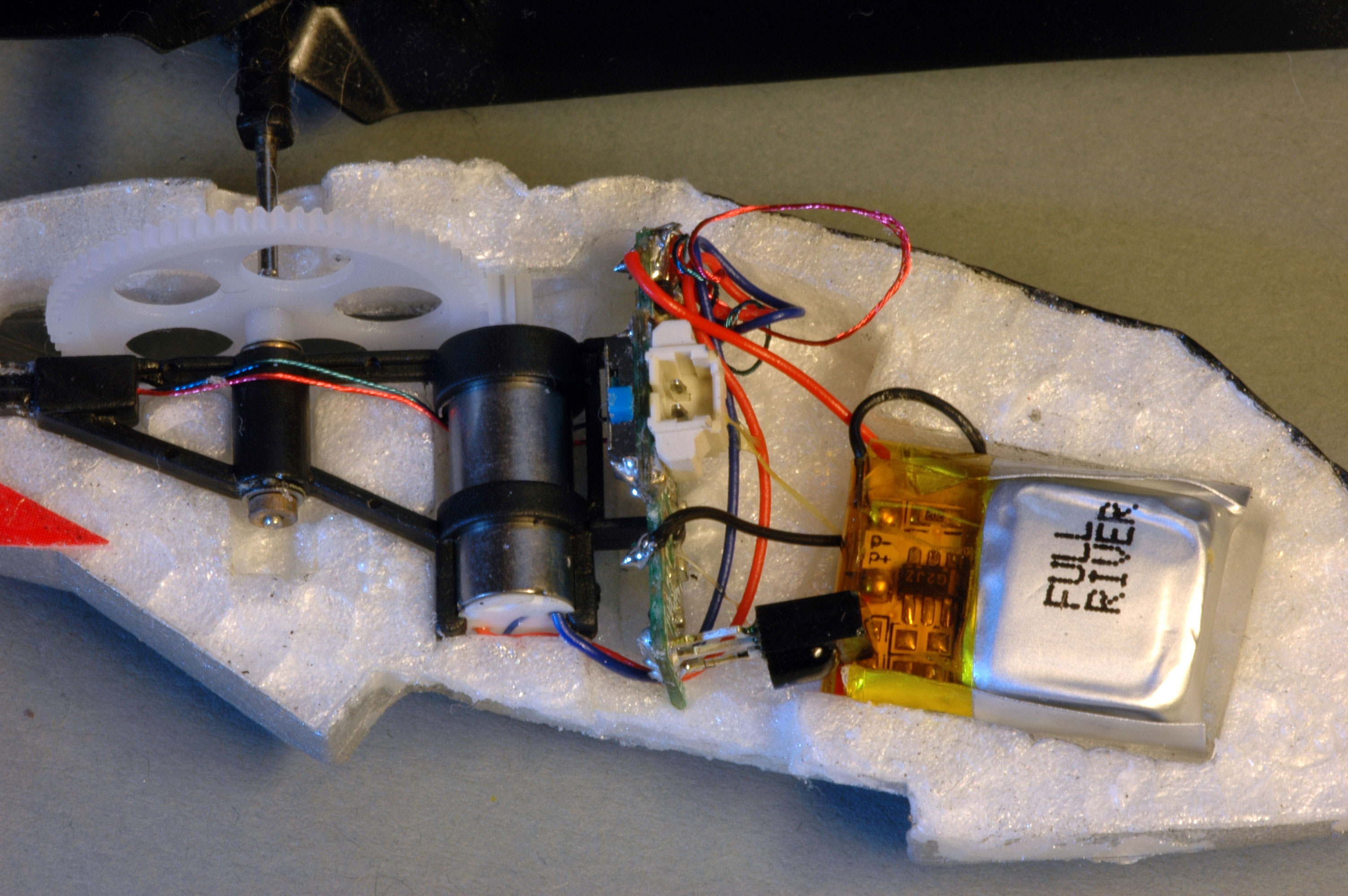
Interior of the Picoo Z.

The Picoo Z (also sold under the brand name of Air Hogs Havoc Heli in North America) is a miniature remote-controlled 2-channel helicopter manufactured by Hong Kong–based Silverlit Toys. In the United States it is distributed by Spin Master.

Designed by the Belgian engineer Alexander van de Rostyne, the Picoo Z was the smallest remote-controlled production model helicopter in the world (Guinness World Records) in 2006. However, Silverlit beats their own record again in 2013 with an even smaller RC helicopter, the Nano Falcon.

== Features and capabilities ==
Weighing a mere 10 grams, the Picoo Z measures 170 mm long, and has a main rotor span of 130 mm. The helicopter is controlled by a 3-frequency a-b-c infrared controller, with two channels (one for the main rotor and one for the tail rotor) allowing independent user control of throttle (main rotor RPM) and tail rotor RPM. It is designed for indoor flying, but can also be flown outdoors in calm conditions with minimal lighting, otherwise the sun will overpower the IR transmitter and cause the Picoo Z to crash. The Picoo Z is made of tough EPP (expanded polypropylene) foam and comprises a lithium polymer rechargeable battery and 2 micro motors. The helicopter is recharged by plugging it into the controller. Charging generally takes 10–15 minutes and will give the Picoo Z a flight duration anywhere between five and seven minutes. Range is limited due to the use of infrared instead of the more common radio frequency remote control. Because of this, ambient light may also have varying degrees of effect on the range and responsiveness of the helicopter. MSRP is US$20–40.

The Picoo Z features a self-stabilized main rotor with a weighted airfoil-type stabilizer bar that removes the need for corrective pilot input to achieve stable flight. Because of this full-cyclic-authority stabilizer design, merely applying enough lift power to cancel gravity allows the Picoo Z to hover almost immediately making it very simplistic for a beginner.

The Picoo Z can reduce or increase the output through the tail rotor by means of an independent motor, allowing it to yaw left or right. Many full-sized (and model) rotorcraft have mechanically interconnected main and tail rotors so that when changing main rotor speed (and hence yaw torque), the tail rotor follows suit to compensate. Because the Picoo Z uses independent motors for the main and tail rotors, this interconnection (mixing) is electronically provided. Despite this, many users find that they must apply constant left or right stick to cause the tail rotor to spin at the appropriate speed to prevent it from spinning wildly along the rotor axis. However, with a little practice, most users find that they can easily compensate for any shortcomings of the electronic mixing.

The remote control includes a trim button that allows the user to adjust the amount of electronic compensation. The trim feature works by decreasing or increasing output of the tail rotor to lower or add torque. As with its higher-powered counterparts, aggressive throttle changes can result in strong yaw motions, an effect that is even more significant when the helicopter battery is freshly charged.

In order to simplify the rotor head design, the Picoo Z does not feature either collective or user-input cyclic control, which would have allowed the user to freely fly it forwards & backwards / left & right on demand. The rotor blades are mounted on a simple rocking hinge, and the rotor has no swashplate.) Because of this limitation, the user must add left or right tail control inputs and rely on torque-induced precession (also known as gyroscopic precession) to transition to forward flight.

The helicopter includes 3 stick-on weights that can be attached to the nose in order to achieve forward flight, and some owners add greater weight (paper clips or pellets) to the nose, or nose canards. These modifications do increase the forward flight speed, but can reduce hovering ability and can increase the battery drain. Another mod that allows the helicopter to fly forward is to slightly twist the tail rotor downwards. This mod has the advantage of not adding weight to the helicopter and therefore doesn't affect battery drain.

However, the Picoo Z lacks the ability to fly forward on its own, and without mods is only able to change its altitude and yaw.

The Picoo Z also incorporates a small blue/red LED that flashes to indicate that the unit is turned on. The LED is also useful for night time flying and locating the unit in the event that it is misplaced.

== Instant popularity ==
The Picoo Z was released in the summer of 2006. Due to the magnitude of popularity from the consumers and the manufacturer and distributors underestimating this popularity, the first shipments were sold out instantly when they arrived in the stores. This instant popularity has made some resellers offer the Picoo Z for premium prices upwards of US$150. It has also rather quickly spawned a number of Chinese-made clones to the market that have an estimated street price of around $13 retail. Most of SilverLit's toys are manufactured in China.

The popularity of the Picoo Z has also led to a fan base that has created several web sites that include forums, modification information, and tips. There are also a growing number a fan made videos being posted on video sharing sites such as YouTube.

== Specifications ==
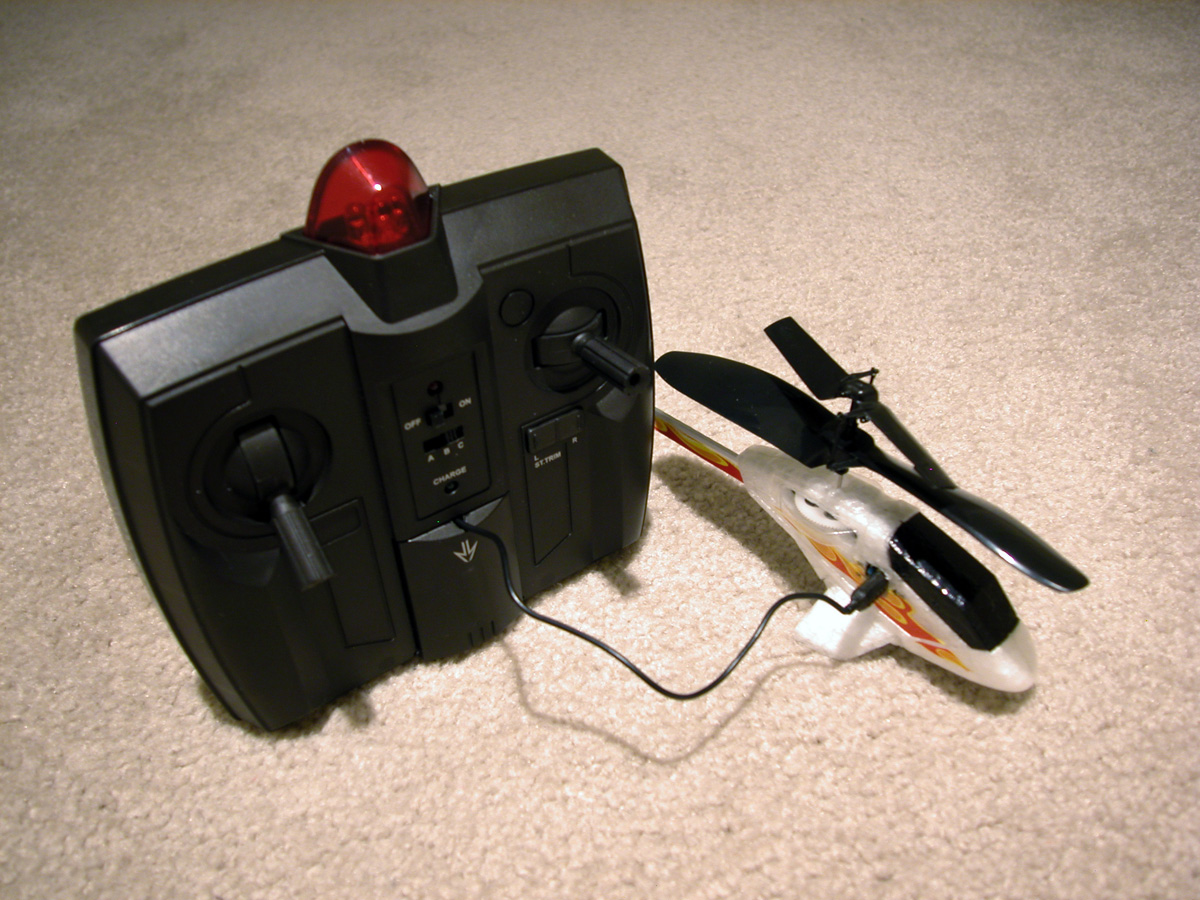
Picoo Z charged directly from the 2-channel controller.

- Main Rotor Diameter: 130 mm (5.25 in)
- Length: 170 mm (6.5 in) excluding rotors
- Rear Rotor Diameter: 30 mm (1.25 in)
- Weight: 10 g
- Charge Time: 20 minutes for full charge
- Flight Duration: 5 to 10 minutes between charges
- Control Specification: 2-channel proportional infrared control system
- Flight: hover and descend, turn left and right
- Range: Up to 10 m (30 ft)

== Variations ==
- green w/ black rotors – Channel C
- Red w/ black rotors – Channel A
- Yellow w/ black rotors – Channel B
- Silver w/ transparent rotors (Metro Fly) – Channel A
- Camo w/ dark green rotors (Desert King) – Channel B
- Pink w/ pink rotors (Pinki) – Channel C
- Apache w/ black rotors – Channel C
- Sky challenger set – Channel A+B
- SEGA branded version – Channel B

(Each variation runs on one of three different frequency channels)

The SEGA branded version is silver with a SEGA logo on the side and was available as a prize in UFO Catcher machines, distributed by SegaPrize Europe.

Most versions have only one large gear transmitting power to the main rotor, but there exist versions with two smaller gears (such as the "Sky Challenger" set). They can be easily identified by the lack of the wide transparent plastic protector around the gear.

During 2008 a range of new picooz variations have been released including Picooz tandem Z-1 (chinook style) at the Picooz Atlas-Uranus (also known as the tricooZ). All of these are 3 channel helicopters and all include three different colours.

== Sky Challenger ==
Sky Challenger is a set of two custom body picoo z helicopters. Each helicopter is equipped with an infra-red LED which is used to "shoot" the other helicopter. The set generally comes with 2 picoo z's in Red and Blue paint schemes and 2 controllers. The controllers are the same as normal picoo z controllers apart from a shoulder button used to "fire" the infra-red. There are 3 stages to the game. The 1st shot will cause the enemy helicopter to spin, the 2nd shot will cause the enemy helicopter to drop in power, the 3rd shot will cause the enemy helicopter to lose all power, causing it to fall to the floor. The helicopters generally come preset to the A and B frequency options.
