= CCPM =

CCPM may refer to:

- Concurrent CP/M, a Digital Research operating system
- Critical Chain Project Management
- Cyclic/collective pitch mixing
