= Cyclic/collective pitch mixing =

Cyclic/collective pitch mixing (CCPM) is a control concept employed in collective pitch radio-controlled helicopters. CCPM reduces mechanical complexity and increases precision of control of the helicopter rotor's swashplate. Unlike conventional systems in which a single actuator is responsible for a single axis, CCPM mechanisms allow multiple actuators to work together to manipulate all axes of control.

== Conventional operation ==
Older model helicopters use three independent servos to manipulate the swashplate. The elevator servo is used to tilt the swashplate forward and aft (longitudinal cyclic), varying the aircraft's pitch. The aileron servo is used to tilt the swashplate left and right (lateral cyclic), varying the aircraft's roll. The collective pitch servo raises and lowers the entire swashplate, varying the collective, and hence the pitch of all the rotor blades collectively. An intermediate mechanical mixing system is used to transfer the control inputs from the servos to the swashplate, therefore the name of mechanical CCPM (mCCPM). This requires an elaborate system of control rods and levers, which often contains many ball bearings.

== Electronic mixing ==
To reduce the mechanical complexity, newer model helicopters use a software system (usually running on the transmitter) to mix the control inputs of three interdependent servos to control the swashplate. The three servo linkages are arranged around the swashplate at 120° intervals (there is a variation that uses 140° + 140° + 80° intervals). In addition to lower mechanical complexity, the interdependent servos share the workload.

An evolution of electronic mixing is the advent of flight controllers, otherwise known as "flybarless systems". Flybarless systems provide two key benefits to model helicopters. By removing the mechanical flybar from the rotorhead, there is less mass and lower aerodynamic drag resulting in improved efficiency. The accelerometers in the flybarless system also provide electronic stabilisation, allowing for finer levels of tuning and greater flight characteristics.

== See also ==
- Anatomy of a helicopter
- Helicopter flight controls
- Aeronautical engineering
