= Air Age Media =

- Founded: 1929, New York City
- Founder: George C. Wilson
- Headquarters: Wilton, Connecticut
- Website: www.airage.com

Air Age Media Inc, based in Wilton, Connecticut, is a multimedia publisher of information for enthusiasts of radio-control cars, planes, helicopters and boats. In addition to seven magazines devoted to RC aviation and die-cast models, Air Age produces products including books, special issues, DVDs, a network of 12 websites and RCX, a radio control expo. Air Age Media’s magazines reach about 125,000 readers per month across a wide age spectrum, from young action-sports fans to seasoned modelers.

Air Age Media was founded in 1929, as a family business by George C. Johnson in New York City with the launch of Model Airplane News. Air Age Media is still family owned and operated in Wilton, Connecticut.

== Publications ==
=== Radio Control ===
- Model Airplane News
- Radio Control Car Action
- Backyard Fyer
- Radio Control Helicopter
- RC Boat Modeler
- X Nitro RC

=== Diecast ===
- Die Cast X

=== Aviation ===
- Flight Journal
