= Model Airplane News =

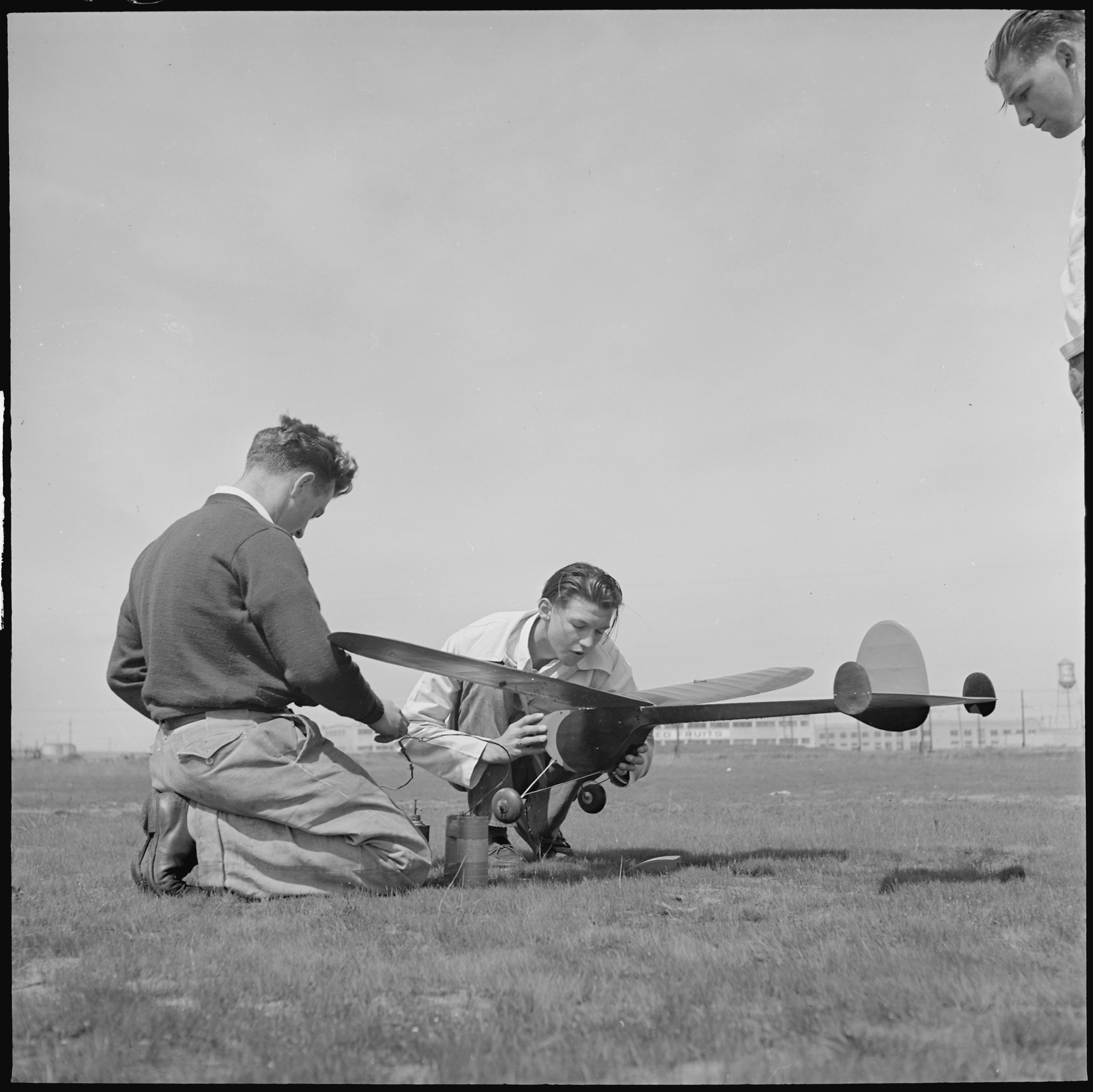
A model airplane— the editorial focus of Model Airplane News

Model Airplane News is a monthly magazine focusing upon the hobby of radio control airplanes. Model Airplane News reviews radio control aircraft from backyard flyers, to giant scale airplanes, and features how-to articles, product reviews, modeling technology, and construction projects.

== History and profile ==
Model Airplane News was launched in 1929 in the United States by Air Age Media Inc. The magazine is based in Wilton, Connecticut.

=== Editors ===
- Charles Hampson Grant
- Andy Lennon, former contributing editor
