= JO-ZERO =

Humanoid robot

The JO-ZERO is an agile humanoid robot designed by manga artist Minoru Kamiya, who created the anime show Act On!. The robot, manufactured by Himeji Softworks, was presented at the International Robot Exhibition 2009.
