= IRCHA =

Organization created by radio control helicopter pilots

The International Radio Controlled Helicopter Association (IRCHA) is an organization created by radio control helicopter pilots. IRCHA works to promote the continued growth of radio-controlled helicopters through education, representation, service, and special events. IRCHA works closely with the AMA (Academy of Aeronautics) to foster growth and acceptance among radio control modelers.

== History ==
IRCHA was created in 1989 by Don Chapman as the representative body for helicopter pilots. The Academy of Model Aeronautics recognizes one organization as the Special Interest Group for each particular segment of the hobby. The International Radio Controlled Helicopter Association was recognized as the SIG for helicopters during a time when model helicopters were still evolving. It was at this time an organization representing helicopter pilots needed to be created to ensure each of those pilots was represented to the AMA.

== IRCHA Jamboree ==
The IRCHA Jamboree is a "fun fly" typically starting the second week in August. The event is held in Muncie, Indiana at the AMA Headquarters. The IRCHA Jamboree attracts radio control helicopter enthusiasts from around the world, including pilots, vendors and spectators.

Registered pilots may fly their helicopters, participate in seminars, or compete in a multitude of exciting exhibition events including drag racing, pylon racing, night flying competition, or a freestyle 3D competition.

=== Attendance ===
The IRCHA Jamboree is the largest event of its kind in the world. The 2009 IRCHA Jamboree had a total of 954 registered pilots at the event, shattering the previous record, set in 2008, with a total of 780 registered pilots. In 2012 the record was broken once again with a total of 1,049 registered pilots.
