= Bob Kress =

American aircraft and aeronautical engineer

Bob Kress (1929–2007) was an American aircraft and aeronautical engineer.

He is specially known for being engineering manager for the project of the Grumman F-14 Tomcat. He joined Grumman in 1951.

He worked on the:

- F9F Cougar
- XF10F Jaguar swing wing experimental fighter
- F11F-1 Tiger
- proposed STOL ASW flying boats
- OV-1 Mohawk Observation Aircraft
- design of STOL and VTOL aircraft
- F-111B TFX
- LM Systems Simulation for the lunar module
- LM Guidance Navigation and Control.
- From the F-14A's inception until 1971, he was the program's engineering manager, after which he was appointed F-14 deputy development program manager.

He can be seen describing the development of the now-retired F-14 into a maneuvering dogfighter on Modern Marvels: F14 DVD, and F-14D Tomcat vs. F/A18 E/F Super Hornet Two experts say the Super Hornet isn't so super By Bob Kress and Rear Adm. Paul Gillcrist, U.S. Navy (Ret.)

He is credited with the idea of a computer controlled wing sweep mechanism that could be used in combat maneuvering.
