= International Robot Exhibition =

Biennial robot fair in Tokyo, Japan

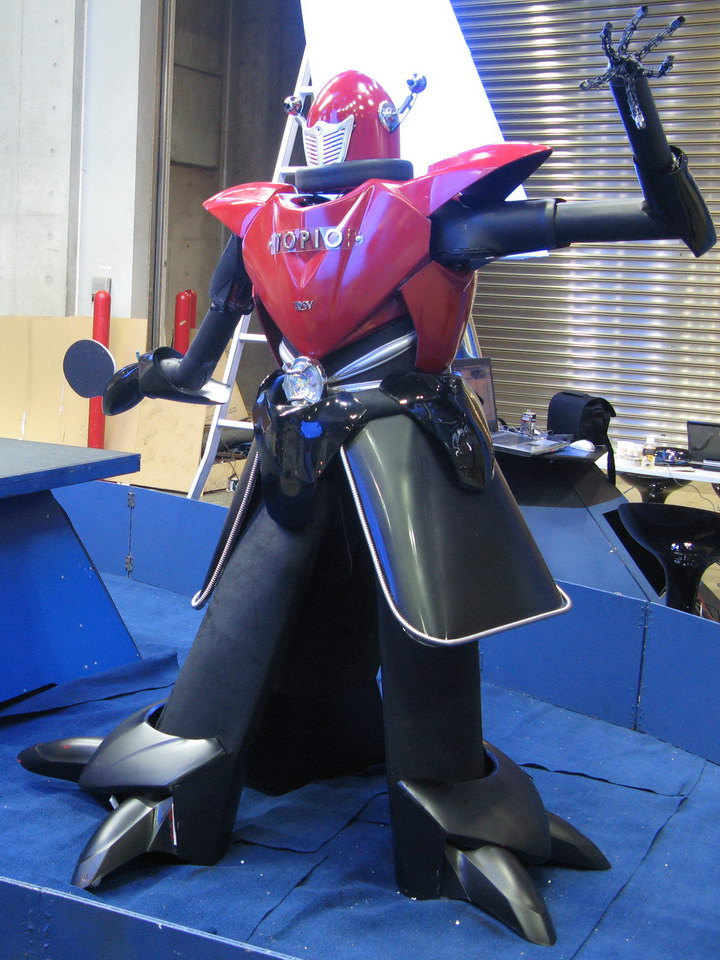
A robot playing ping pong at the 2007 Tokyo Exhibition

The International Robot Exhibition (IREX) is the largest robot trade fair in the world. It is an event that has been staged once every two years in Tokyo, Japan since 1973 and is organized by the Japan Robot Association (JARA) and the company Nikkan Kogyo Shimbun, Ltd. It is a place for companies from Japan and around the world to exhibit the latest in robot technology.

== Robots ==
These are some examples of the robots that have been displayed at previous exhibitions.

- Actroid
- Seiko Epson Micro flying robot
- TOPIO
- JO-ZERO
