= Nikkan Kogyo Shimbun =

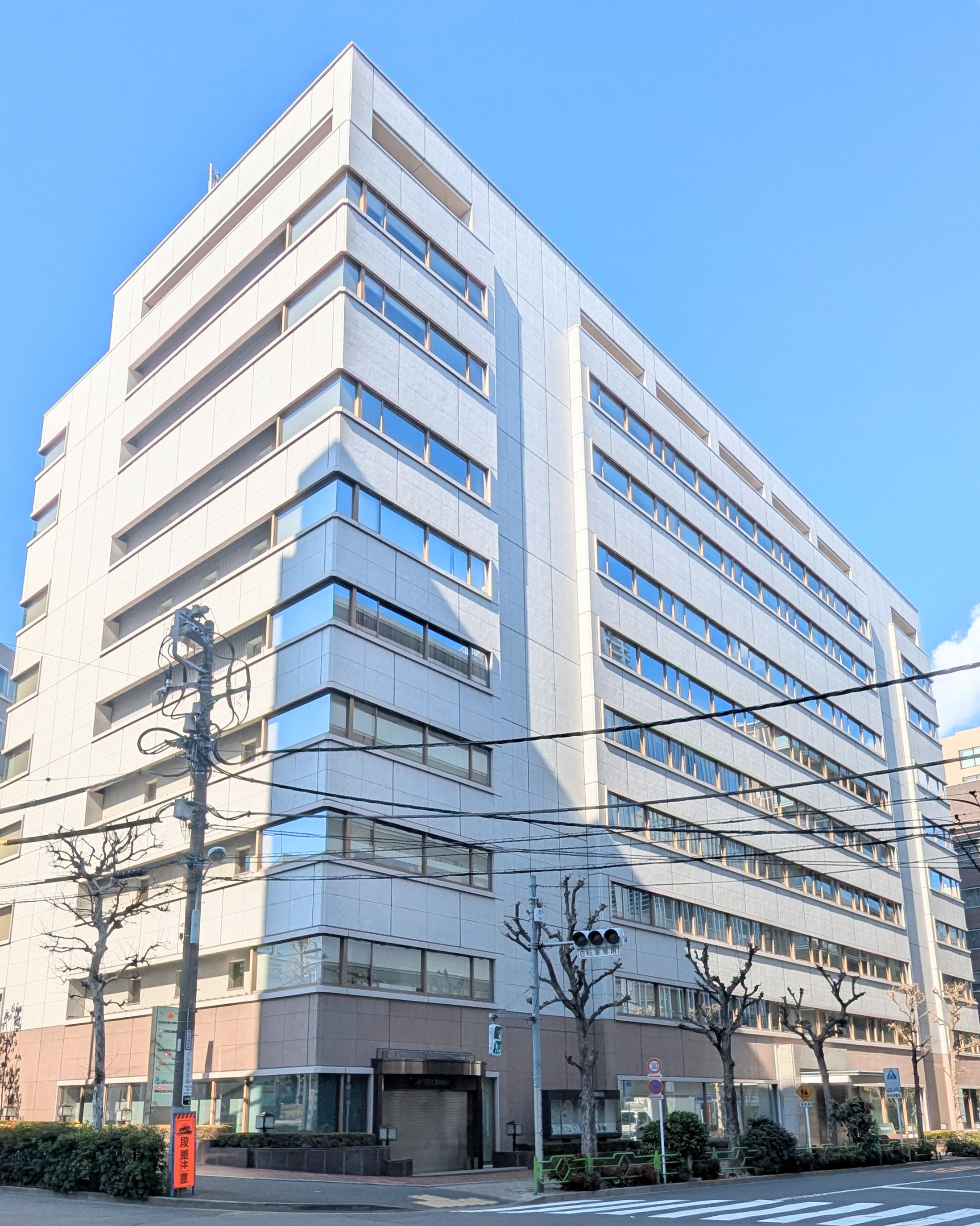
- Nikkan Kogyo head office in Tokyo
- Type: Daily newspaper
- Format: Print, online
- Owner(s): Nikkan Kogyo Shimbun Co., Ltd.
- Founded: 1915
- Language: Japanese
- Website: https://www.nikkan.co.jp/

Nikkan Kogyo Shimbun (日刊工業新聞, The Daily Industrial News), is a daily newspaper in Japan. It is published by The Nikkan Kogyo Shimbun. The newspaper was inaugurated in 1915. It covers economic and industrial affairs in general, and affairs of specific industries such as automobile, electronics, telecommunication, information technologies, science, etc.

Apart from publishing newspapers, the company publishes numerous books and free papers (namely Metro-Guide), and organizes trade fairs (Automotive Parts Product Solution Fair / International Robot Exhibition / Pan-Exhibition for Wash and Clean etc.) and seminars. Among them, collaboration with United Nations Industrial Development Organization (UNIDO) is a notable achievement. The two agencies jointly organized a seminar in June 2006, 2007 and 2008, namely "Global Auto Parts Business Seminar", for the purpose of further enhancing Japanese investment (especially auto-parts sector) at newly industrial states.

The newspaper concluded an alliance with Asahi Shimbun and Jiji Press in February 2008. Three companies start a new service on information search by internet from April 2008. Japanese name is "KIJISAKU". More than eight million articles and information of three media agencies are put in this service.
