= Epson Micro Flying Robot =

The Micro Flying Robot (μFR) is the world’s smallest and lightest robot helicopter prototype, which was developed by Epson and demonstrated at the International Robot Exhibition in Tokyo in November 2003. The purpose of its development was to demonstrate its micro-mechatronics technology and to explore the possible use of micro robots and the development of component technology applications.

== Features and capabilities ==
The μFR is levitated by contra-rotating propellers powered by four 7x2x1-mm ultrasonic motors (originally developed for wristwatches) and is balanced in mid-air by means of a stabilizing mechanism that uses a linear actuator. Though the μFR is radio-controlled, it relies on power from an external battery via a power cable and thus its flying range is limited. The μFR includes two microprocessors, a bluetooth module, a gyro-sensor, an accelerometer and an image sensor.

== Development of μFR-II ==
The μFR-II is the enhanced version of the μFR. It was developed in 2004 for full wireless operation paired with independent flight capability. The main challenge was the need to combine lighter weight with greater dynamic lift. Epson made the robot lighter by developing a new gyro-sensor that is one-fifth the weight of its predecessor. Dynamic lift was boosted 30% by the introduction of more powerful ultra-thin ultrasonic motors and newly designed, optimally shaped main rotors. The μFR-II includes two 32-bit RISC microcontrollers, an on-board lithium polymer battery, as well as an image sensor that can capture and transmit images via Bluetooth wireless connection. At the moment it has a flight time of just 3 minutes.

== Specifications ==
	μFR	μFR-II
Power	3.5 V	4.2 V
Power Consumption	3 W	3.5 W
Diameter	130 mm	136 mm
Height	70 mm	85 mm
Weight	8.9 g	12.3 g
Levitation Power	13 g/f	17 g/f

== Possible applications ==
- Security and surveillance
- Disaster rescue
- Space exploration
