= Academy of Model Aeronautics =

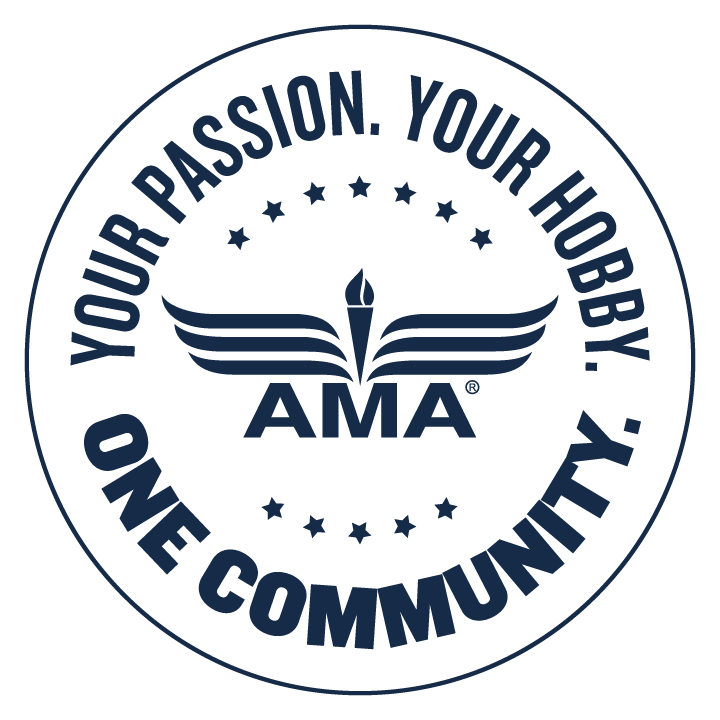
- Nickname: AMA
- Formation: 1936; 90 years ago
- Founded at: New York, New York, U.S.
- Type: Nonprofit
- Registration no.: EIN 520799408
- Headquarters: 5161 E. Memorial Dr.
- Location: Muncie, Indiana 47302, United States
- Website: www.modelaircraft.org
- Formerly called: American Academy for Model Aeronautics

The Academy of Model Aeronautics (AMA), based in Muncie, Indiana, United States at 40°10′36.25″N 85°19′32.19″W, is a non-profit organization dedicated to the promotion of model aviation as a recognized sport as well as a recreational activity. It is the largest organization of its kind with a current membership of approximately 195,000 members, with nearly 57,000 of these being youth members under 19 years of age.

Founded in 1936, the AMA is the official national body for model aviation in the United States. They sanction more than one thousand model competitions, and an increasing number of non-competitive fly-in events for member aeromodelers throughout the country each year, charter more than 2500 model airplane clubs and offer contest sanctioning, liability insurance and the procurement of flying sites. They also certify official model flying records.

All AMA-chartered clubs require their flying members to purchase AMA memberships for said liability insurance. In order to be covered by their insurance, an AMA member does not need to fly at a chartered club's flying site, but members have to follow their "Safety Code" guidelines. AMA's insurance coverage is in excess of one's homeowner's or other insurance.

With interest in small park flyer aircraft, which are often flown outside of regular club fields, the AMA provides low-cost membership and coverage for park flyer enthusiasts.

AMA organizes the annual National Aeromodeling Championships, the world's largest model airplane competition as well as providing press coverage of major meets across the country via their monthly publication, Model Aviation.

Other publications include Park Pilot for those interested in park flyers or who are enrolled in the Academy's park pilot program, as well as starting in March 2010, AMA Today, a bi-monthly e-newsletter sent via e-mail to members. The AMA's Web presence is partly updated through the monthly "AMA Air" news video hosted on YouTube.

Given the unique nature of model aviation insofar as it requires both airspace as well as frequency allocation for radio control, the AMA serves as a liaison with the Federal Aviation Administration concerning aeromodeling safety and operation of model aircraft as it relates to full-scale aviation, most recently with the nascent development and beginnings of non-military, commercial and public-use UAV deployment in the National Airspace System over the United States, and how the FAA can equitably regulate such commercial and public use of UAVs, simultaneous with accommodating the needs of recreational and sport flying of radio control model aircraft and their close-cousin, strictly hobbyist-flown FPV unmanned aerial vehicles, with the AMA as a "community-based organizational" advocate for the aeromodeler. The AMA also works with both the Federal Communications Commission and the American Radio Relay League concerning available radio bandwidth for radio-controlled aeromodelling activities, with the ARRL primarily functioning as a partner for the purpose of the use of selected amateur radio frequencies (particularly on the well-established 6-meter band, used throughout the United States and Canada) and developing use on the low-UHF 70 cm amateur band for RC flying, especially for FPV activities, (increasingly using spread spectrum transmission as 2.4 GHz RC does) by amateur radio license-holding aeromodelers, beyond the other existing low-end VHF (72 MHz) and upper-end UHF 2.4 GHz spread spectrum bands' uses for radio control aeromodeling in the two North American nations. As an associate member of the National Aeronautic Association, the AMA is recognized by the Fédération Aéronautique Internationale, the world governing body of all aviation activity.

== Insurance ==
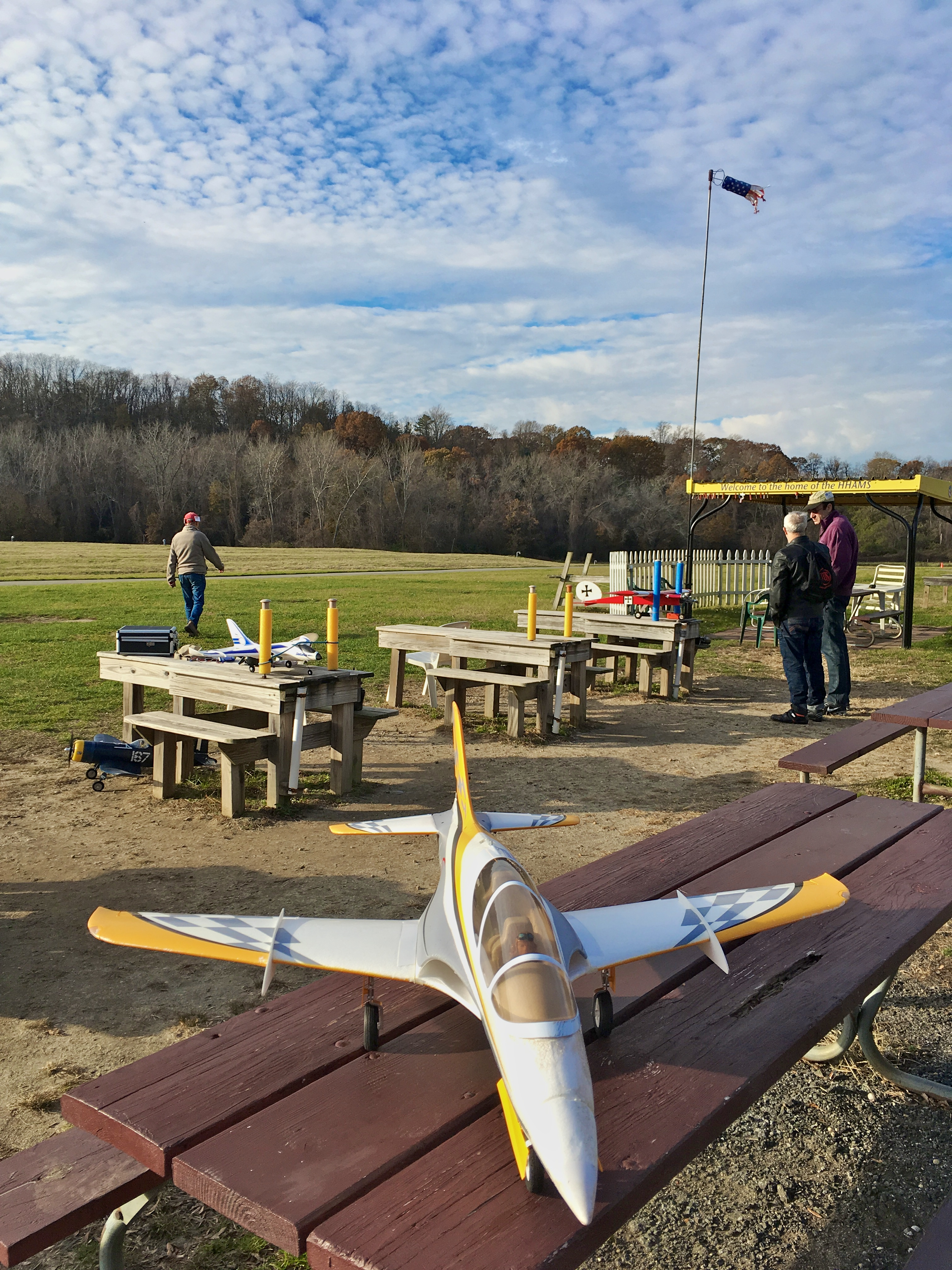
An AMA-chartered club, HHAMS, runs this flying site

While many members view AMA insurance as the primary purpose of the organization, the insurance program is low on the list of priorities.

When the organization was first formed five years before the United States' involvement began in World War II, there was no insurance program. The first offering of optional liability insurance was first suggested in 1939. $0.50 extra was to provide $500.00 liability protection. By the early 1940s, coverage was raised to $1000.00 worth of protection.

By the mid-1940s the insurance program was often referred to as a "gas license" as it was becoming required for operation of gasoline-powered models at most club flying sites and for many contests.

The insurance program presently offers US$2.5 million in coverage. Most leases on flying sites not owned by an aeromodeling club require adequate insurance to be carried by all people who will be flying; many clubs — the great majority of which are already "chartered clubs" within the AMA organizational structure in the United States — require AMA membership even for guests flying models at their field.

AMA also offers optional site insurance which is considered to be primary coverage and is very low cost. This insurance is subsidized by part of each member's dues.

There is also an additional insurance coverage for each sanctioned event.

By providing the insurance, AMA makes it far easier for clubs or individuals to acquire access to flying sites. It is now standard policy of the US Army Corps of Engineers (COE) to require AMA insurance or equivalent coverage in order to acquire a lease of COE-managed land for model aircraft operation.

== Regional districts within the United States ==
- AMA District I: the six states comprising New England
- AMA District II: New Jersey and New York
- AMA District III: Ohio, Pennsylvania and West Virginia
- AMA District IV: Delaware, the District of Columbia, Maryland, North Carolina and Virginia
- AMA District V: Alabama, Florida, Georgia, Mississippi, Puerto Rico, South Carolina, Tennessee and the U.S. Virgin Islands
- AMA District VI: Illinois, Indiana, Kentucky and Missouri
- AMA District VII: Iowa, Michigan, Minnesota and Wisconsin
- AMA District VIII: Arkansas, Louisiana, New Mexico, Oklahoma and Texas
- AMA District IX: Colorado, Kansas, Nebraska, North Dakota, South Dakota and Wyoming
- AMA District X: Arizona, California, Hawaii, Nevada and Utah
- AMA District XI: Alaska, Idaho, Montana, Oregon and Washington

== See also ==
- Model Aeronautics Association of Canada
- IRCHA
