= Model Aviation =

Aviation Evolutionary Revolution

Model Aviation is the monthly full-color publication written, prepared and distributed by the Academy of Model Aeronautics beginning in 1936 and established as an independent publication in July 1975. The magazine is based in Muncie, Indiana.

It is a standard benefit of club membership and covers all aspects (primarily free flight, control line and radio control model aircraft) enjoyed as the core of the hobby activity of aeromodeling. Model Aviation is considered to be the voice of the AMA and features editorial content, product reviews, how-to articles and coverage of major national and international aeromodeling events.

The publication now offers multiple digital outlets. In addition to the printed issue, members can view every issue since 1975 through the digital library database (a web-based digital viewer). Bonus content and supplemental articles related to the print magazine can be found at the website of the magazine. And Model Aviation offers a tablet app of the magazine for Android and Apple for a fee.

The magazine itself is available by subscription to non-AMA members and over the counter at select hobby shops across the country.
