= Swashplate (aeronautics) =

Mechanism to control angle of attack of helicopter rotor blades

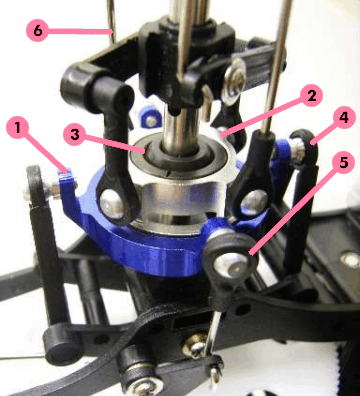
Swashplate on a radio-controlled helicopter. 1. Non-rotating outer ring (blue). 2. Turning inner ring (silver). 3. Ball joint. 4. Control (pitch) preventing turning of outer ring. 5. Control (roll). 6. Linkages (silver) to the rotor blade

In aeronautics, a swashplate is a mechanical device that translates input via the helicopter flight controls into motion of the main rotor blades. Because the main rotor blades are spinning, the swashplate is used to transmit three of the pilot's commands from the non-rotating fuselage to the rotating rotor hub and mainblades.

== History ==
The swashplate was first tested in 1907 by brothers Jules and Paul Cornu. They obtained a patent for the device (French Patent No. 398,545, June 7, 1909). Although its principle is also found in earlier patents by other screw inventors. The first successful implementation of the swashplate was made by de la Cierva in 1922 in his autogyro.

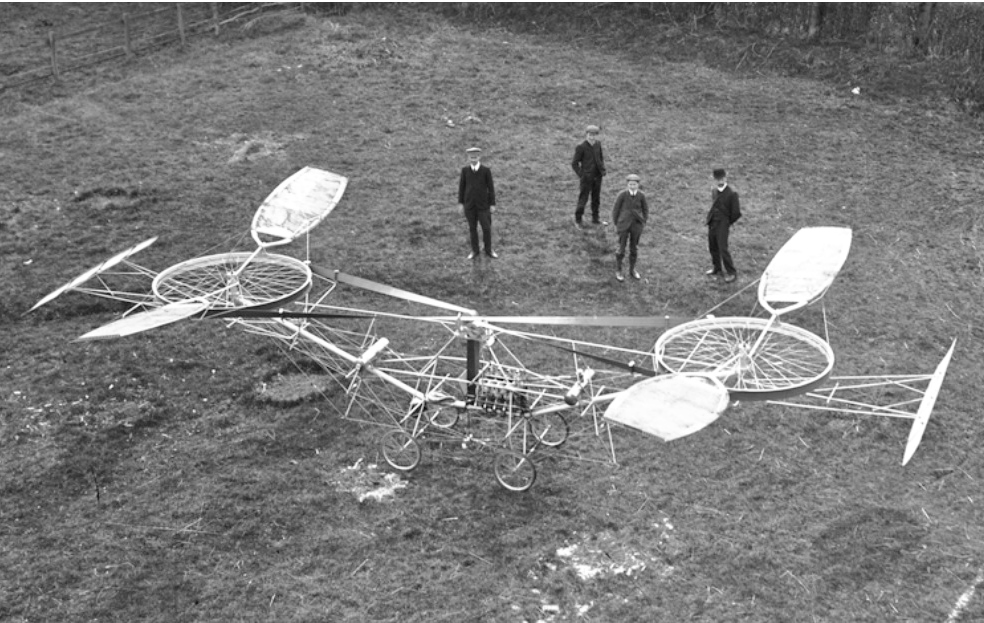
In 1907 before the flight test of Cornu's helicopter. Can be seen wheels (plates) with levers controlling the pitch of the propellers.

Today, on most modern aircraft the swashplate is above the transmission and the pushrods are visible outside the fuselage, but a few early designs, notably light helicopters built by Enstrom Helicopter, placed it underneath the transmission and enclosed the rotating pushrods inside the mainshaft. This reduces rotor hub drag since there are no exposed linkages.

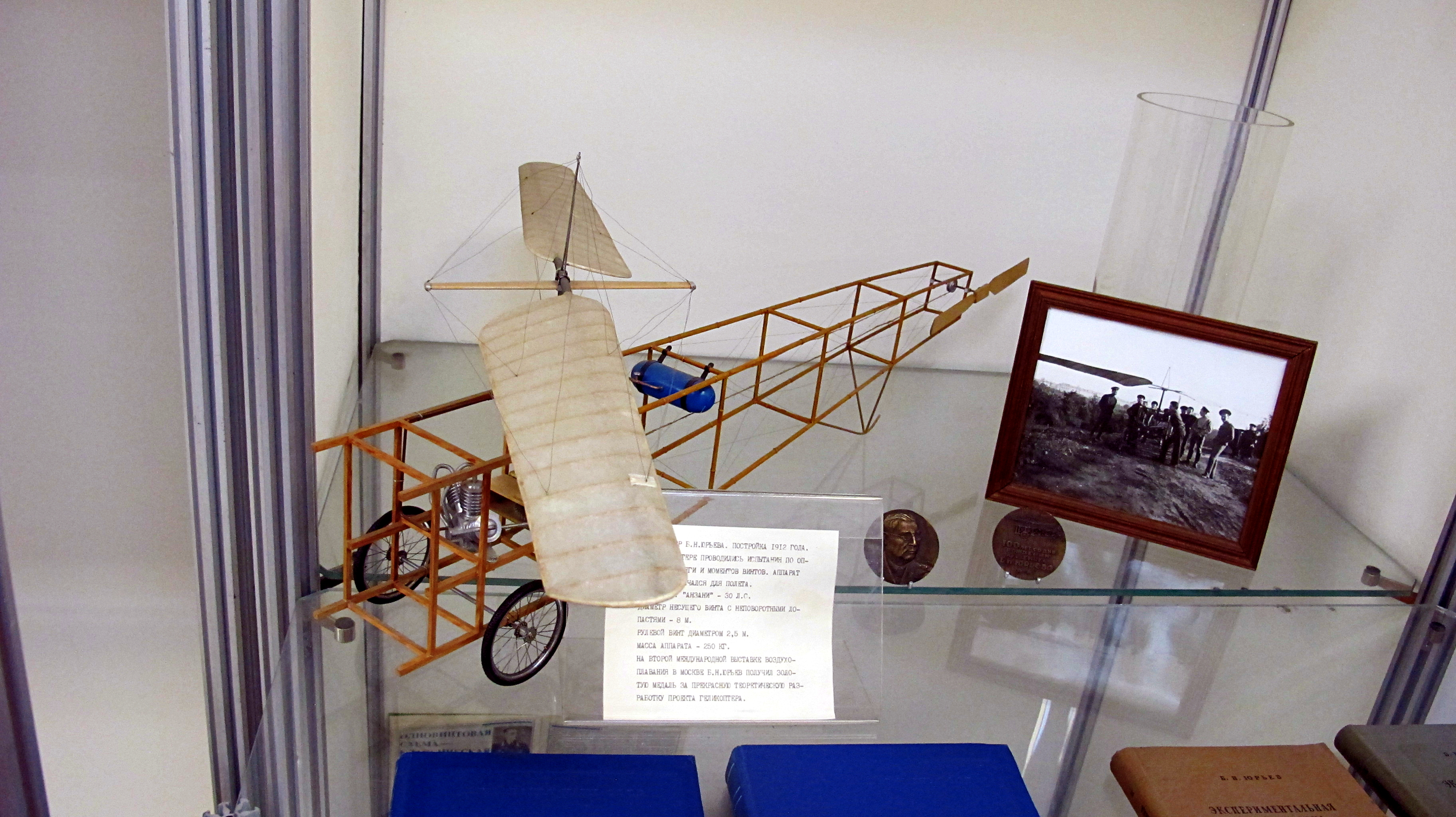
A scaled model of an exhibition full-size mock-up of a single-rotor helicopter, proposed in 1912 by students of the IMTS headed by Boris Yuriev (1889-1957). No details of the mechanism are shown on the mock-up.

Other swashplate and control design have been used. For instance, Kaman Aircraft helicopters do not use a traditional swashplate and instead operate servo flaps on the rotor blades to adjust the angle of attack of the blades.

== Assembly ==
The swashplate consists of two main parts: a stationary swashplate and a rotating swashplate. The stationary (outer) swashplate is mounted on the main rotor mast and is connected to the cyclic and collective controls by a series of pushrods. It is able to tilt in all directions and move vertically. The rotating (inner) swashplate is mounted to the stationary swashplate by means of a bearing and is allowed to rotate with the main rotor mast. An anti-rotation link prevents the inner swash from rotating independently of the blades, which would apply torque to the actuators. The outer swashplate typically has an anti-rotation slider as well to prevent it from rotating. Both swashplates tilt up and down as one unit. The rotating swashplate is connected to the pitch horns by the pitch links. Alternative mechanics to the stationary (outer) swashplate are the hexapod and the universal joint. Swashplates for helicopters having two rotors mounted on the same shaft are much more complex than the single rotor helicopters.

== Cyclic blade control ==
Cyclic controls are used to change a helicopter's roll and pitch. Push rods or hydraulic actuators tilt the outer swashplate in response to the pilot's commands. The swashplate moves in the intuitively expected direction, tilting forwards to respond to a forward input, for instance. However "pitch links" on the blades transmit the pitch information way ahead of the blade's actual position, giving the blades time to "fly up" or "fly down" to reach the desired position. That is, to tilt the helicopter forward, the difference of lift around the blades should be maximum along the left-right plane, creating a torque that, due to the gyroscopic effect, will tilt the rotor disc forward and not sideways.

== Collective blade control ==
To control the collective pitch of the main rotor blades, the entire swashplate must be moved up or down along its axis without changing the orientation of the cyclic controls. Conventionally, each control mechanism, (roll, pitch, and collective) had an individual actuator responsible for the movement. In the case of pitch, the entire swashplate is moved along the mainshaft by a one actuator. However, some newer model helicopters remove this mechanically complex separation of functionalities by using three interdependent actuators that can each move the entire swashplate. This is called cyclic/collective pitch mixing (CCPM). The benefit of CCPM is that smaller actuators can work together to move the swashplate across its full range of control, meaning the actuators can be smaller and lighter.

== Animations ==
Swash plate in the resting position.

A raised swashplate causing negative collective blade pitch and thus down-force. Note that the control arms are on the trailing side of the blades, causing the raised swashplate to decrease the blade pitch.

A tilted swashplate giving cyclic blade control. Note the change in pitch of the blades during rotation.
