= Helicopter flight controls =

Instruments used in helicopter flight

Location of flight controls in a helicopter

Helicopter flight controls are used to achieve and maintain controlled aerodynamic helicopter flight. Changes to the aircraft flight control system transmit mechanically to the rotor, producing aerodynamic effects on the rotor blades that make the helicopter move in a desired way. To tilt forward and back (pitch) or sideways (roll) requires that the controls alter the angle of attack of the main rotor blades cyclically during rotation, creating differing amounts of lift at different points in the cycle. To increase or decrease overall lift requires that the controls alter the angle of attack for all blades collectively by equal amounts at the same time, resulting in ascent, descent, acceleration and deceleration.

A typical helicopter has three flight control inputs: the cyclic stick, the collective lever, and the anti-torque pedals. Depending on the complexity of the helicopter, the cyclic and collective may be linked together by a mixing unit, a mechanical or hydraulic device that combines the inputs from both and then sends along the "mixed" input to the control surfaces to achieve the desired result. The manual throttle may also be considered a flight control because it is needed to maintain rotor speed on smaller helicopters without governors. The governors also help the pilot control the collective pitch on the helicopter's main rotors, to keep a stable, more accurate flight.

== Controls ==
=== Cyclic ===
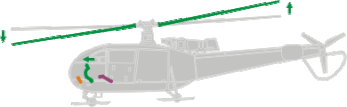
When the cyclic is pushed forwards, the rotor tilts

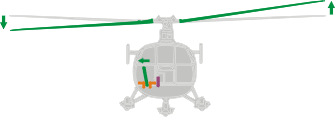
When the cyclic is pushed to the side, the rotor tilts to the side

The cyclic control, commonly called the cyclic stick or just cyclic, is similar in appearance on most helicopters to a control stick from a fixed-wing aircraft. The cyclic stick commonly rises up from beneath the front of each pilot's seat. The Robinson R22 has a "teetering" cyclic design connected to a central column located between the two seats. Helicopters with fly-by-wire systems allow a cyclic-style controller to be mounted to the side of the pilot seat. The cyclic is used to control the main rotor in order to change the helicopter's direction of movement. In a hover, the cyclic controls the movement of the helicopter forward, back, and laterally. During forward flight, the cyclic control inputs cause flight path changes similar to fixed-wing aircraft flight; left or right inputs cause the helicopter to roll into a turn in the desired direction, and forward and back inputs change the pitch attitude of the helicopter resulting in altitude changes (climbing or descending flight). The control is called the cyclic because it independently changes the mechanical pitch angle or feathering angle of each main rotor blade according to its position in the cycle. The pitch is changed so that each blade will have the same angle of incidence as it passes the same point in the cycle, changing the lift generated by the blade at that point and causing each blade to change its angle of incidence, that is, to rotate slightly along its long axis, in sequence as it passes the same point. If that point is dead ahead, the blade pitch increases briefly in that direction. Thus, If the pilot pushes the cyclic forward, the rotor disk tilts forward, and the helicopter is drawn straight ahead. If the pilot pushes the cyclic to the right, the rotor disk tilts to the right. Any rotor system has a delay between the point in rotation where the controls introduce a change in pitch and the point where the desired change in the rotor blade's flight occurs. This difference is caused by phase lag, often confused with gyroscopic precession. A rotor is an oscillatory system that obeys the laws that govern vibration—which, depending on the rotor system, may resemble the behaviour of a gyroscope.

=== Collective ===
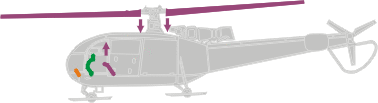
When the collective is pulled, the rotor angle changes.

The collective pitch control, or collective lever, is normally located on the left side of the pilot's seat with an adjustable friction control to prevent inadvertent movement. The collective changes the pitch angle of all the main rotor blades collectively (i.e., all at the same time) and is independent of their position in the rotational cycle. Therefore, if a collective input is made, all the blades change equally, and as a result, the helicopter increases or decreases its total lift derived from the rotor. In level flight this would cause a climb or descent, while with the helicopter pitched forward an increase in total lift would produce an acceleration together with a given amount of ascent. If a helicopter suffers a power failure a pilot can adjust the collective pitch to keep the rotor spinning, generating enough lift to touch down and skid in a relatively soft landing. The collective pitch control in a Boeing CH-47 Chinook is called a thrust control, but serves the same purpose, except that it controls two rotor systems, applying differential collective pitch.

=== Anti-torque pedals ===
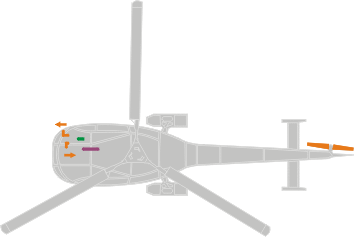
The tail rotor is operated with the pedals

The anti-torque pedals are located in the same place as the rudder pedals in an airplane, and serve a similar purpose—they control the direction that the nose of the aircraft points. Applying the pedal in a given direction changes the tail rotor blade pitch, increasing or reducing tail rotor thrust and making the nose yaw in the direction of the applied pedal Later designs known as 'NOTAR' use an air stream to provide anti-torque control instead of a tail rotor. This air stream is generated in the fuselage by a small fan or turbine, and directed out of the rear of the tail-boom through vent holes. Internal control vanes can vary this flow, allowing the yaw axis to be controlled. NOTAR systems are safer than using a spinning tail rotor, and the absence of the rotor also removes its associated drag, potentially increasing efficiency.

=== Throttle ===
Helicopter rotors are designed to operate at a specific rotational speed. The throttle controls the power of the engine, which is connected to the rotor by a transmission. The throttle setting must maintain enough engine power to keep the rotor speed within the limits where the rotor produces enough lift for flight. In many helicopters, the throttle control is a single or dual motorcycle-style twist grip mounted on the collective control (rotation is opposite of a motorcycle throttle), while some multi-engine helicopters have power levers. In many piston engine-powered helicopters, the pilot manipulates the throttle to maintain rotor speed. Turbine engine helicopters, and some piston helicopters, use governors or other electro-mechanical control systems to maintain rotor speed and relieve the pilot of routine responsibility for that task. (There is normally also a manual reversion available in the event of a governor failure.)

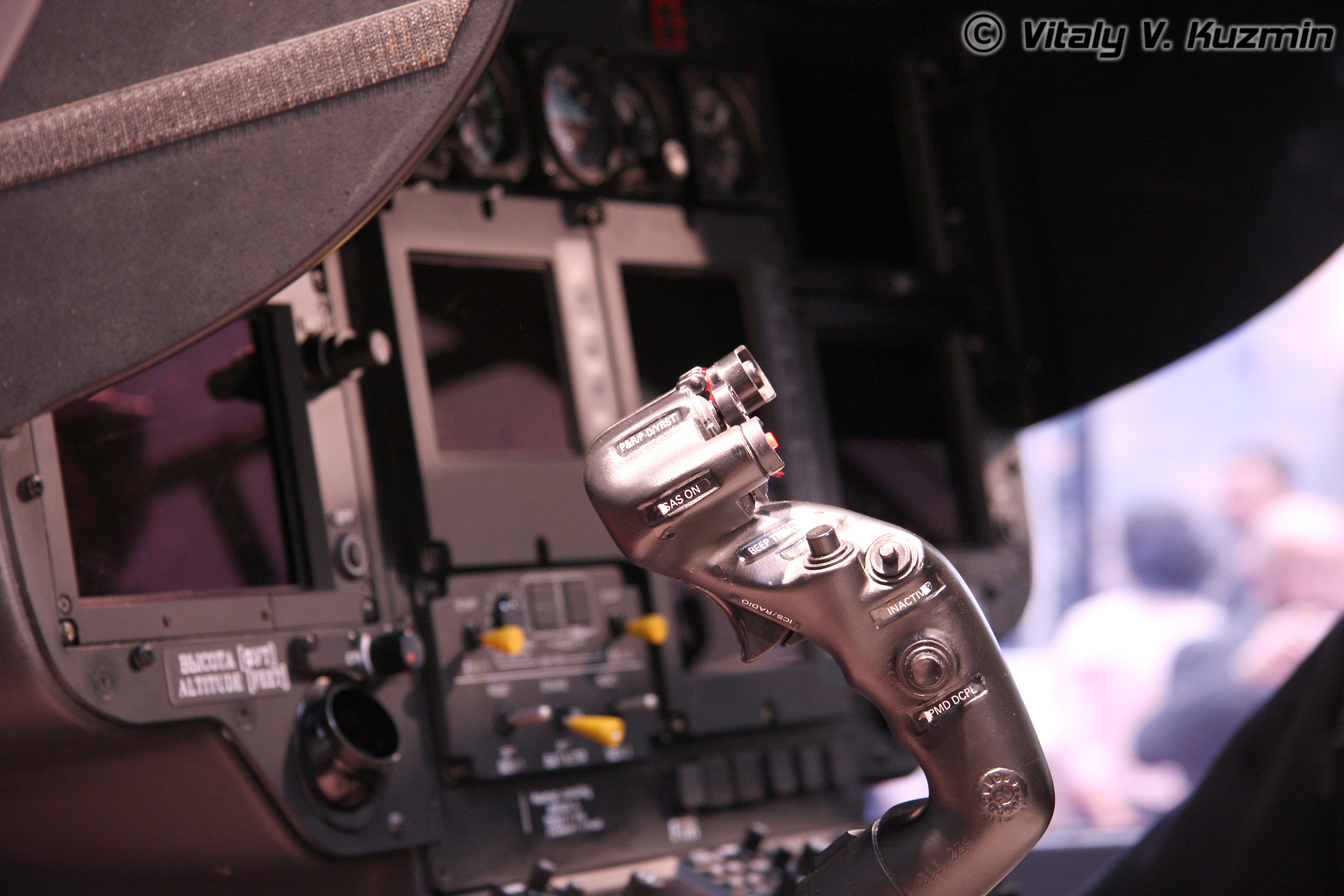
Cyclic control in a H145

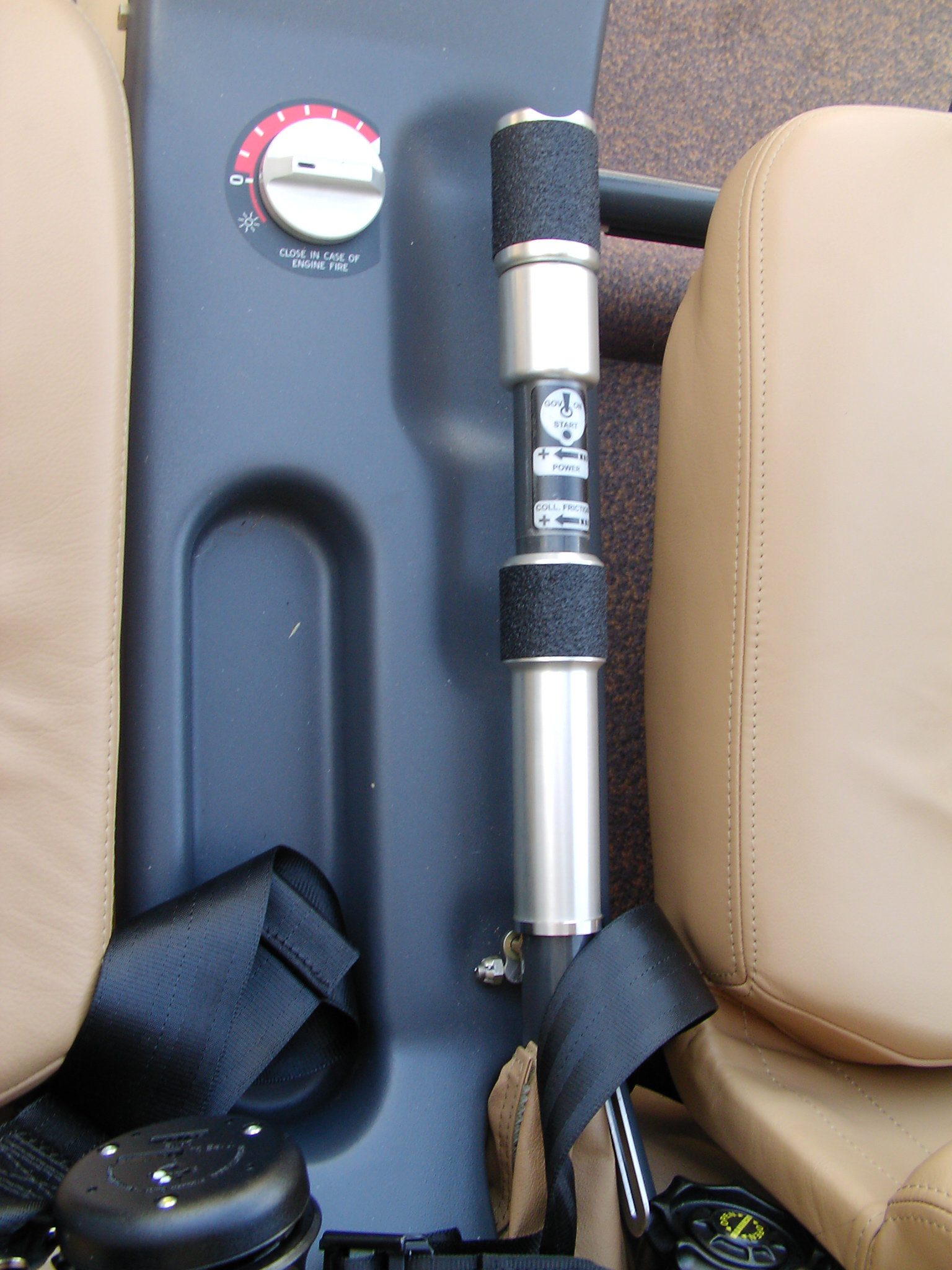
Collective control in a Cabri G2 (viewed from above)

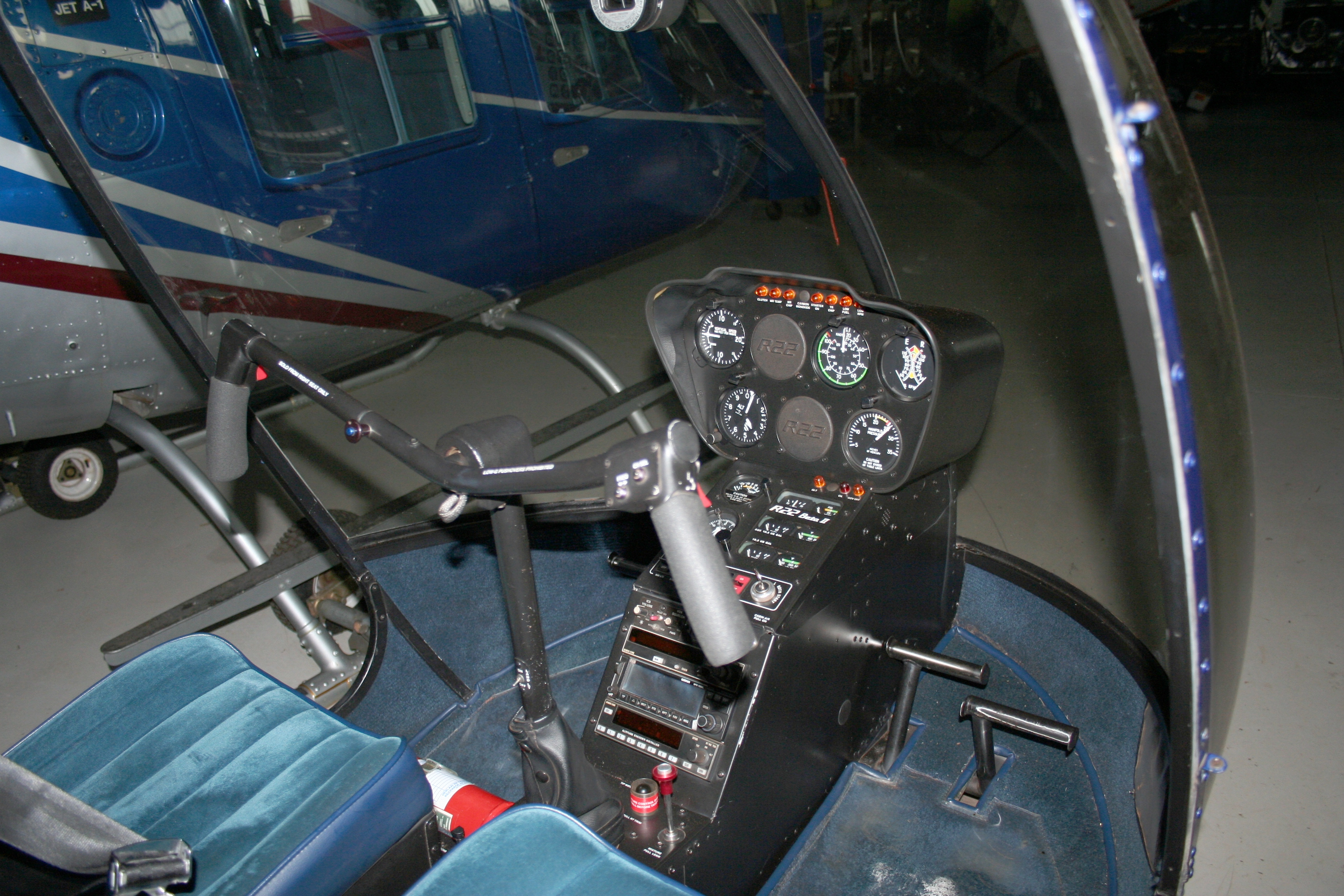
Visible cyclic and pedal controls in a Robinson R22

Helicopter controls and effects
Name	Directly controls	Primary effect	Secondary effect	Used in forward flight	Used in hover flight
Cyclic (lateral)	Varies main rotor blade pitch with fore and aft movement	Tilts main rotor disk forward and back via the swashplate	Induces pitch nose down or up	To adjust forward speed and control rolled-turn	To move forwards/backwards
Cyclic (longitudinal)	Varies main rotor blade pitch with left and right movement	Tilts main rotor disk left and right through the swashplate	Induces roll in direction moved	To create movement to sides	To move sideways
Collective	Collective angle of attack for the rotor main blades via the swashplate	Increase/decrease pitch angle of all main rotor blades equally, causing the aircraft to ascend/descend	Increase/decrease torque. In some helicopters the throttle control(s) is a part of the collective stick. Rotor speed is kept basically constant throughout the flight.	To adjust power through rotor blade pitch setting	To adjust skid height/vertical speed
Anti-torque pedals	Collective pitch supplied to tail rotor blades	Yaw rate	Increase/decrease torque and engine speed (less than collective)	To adjust sideslip angle	To control yaw rate/heading

== Flight conditions ==
There are three basic flight conditions for a helicopter: hover, forward flight and autorotation.

=== Hover ===
Some pilots consider hovering the most challenging aspect of helicopter flight. Because helicopters are generally dynamically unstable, deviations from a given attitude are not corrected without pilot input. Thus, frequent control inputs and corrections must be made by the pilot to keep the helicopter at a desired location and altitude. The pilot's use of control inputs in a hover is as follows: the cyclic is used to eliminate drift in the horizontal plane (e.g., forward, aft, and side to side motion); the collective is used to maintain desired altitude; and the tail rotor (or anti-torque system) pedals are used to control nose direction or heading. It is the interaction of these controls that can make learning to hover difficult, since often an adjustment in any one control requires adjustment of the other two, necessitating pilot familiarity with the coupling of control inputs needed to produce smooth flight.

=== Forward flight ===
In forward flight, a helicopter's flight controls behave more like those in a fixed-wing aircraft. Moving the cyclic forward makes the nose pitch down, thus losing altitude and increasing airspeed. Moving the cyclic back makes the nose pitch up, slowing the helicopter and making it climb. Increasing collective (power) while maintaining a constant airspeed induces a climb, while decreasing collective (power) makes the helicopter descend. Coordinating these two inputs, down collective plus aft (back) cyclic or up collective plus forward cyclic causes airspeed changes while maintaining a constant altitude. The pedals serve the same function in both a helicopter and an airplane, to maintain balanced flight. This is done by applying a pedal input in the direction necessary to center the ball in the turn and bank indicator.

Forward flight in a helicopter has limitations different from a fixed-wing aircraft. In a fixed-wing aircraft the maximum airspeed is limited by the stress that the airframe can withstand; in a helicopter it is limited by the RPM of the rotor and the effective airspeed over each blade. In a stationary hover, each rotor blade will experience the same airspeed at a constant RPM. In forward flight conditions, one rotor blade will be moving into the oncoming air stream while the other moves away from it. At certain airspeeds, this can create a dangerous condition in which the receding rotor blade stalls, causing unstable flight.

This phenomenon, known as retreating blade stall, is more likely to occur at high gross weight, high airspeed, low rotor RPM, high density altitude, or during steep or abrupt turns, and its onset can typically be felt as a low-frequency vibration, a pitching up of the nose, and a roll toward the retreating blade.

== Differential pitch control ==
For helicopters with two horizontally mounted rotors, changes in attitude often require having the two rotors behave inversely in response to the standard control inputs from the pilot. Those with coaxial rotors (such as the Kamov Ka-50) have both rotors mounted on the same mast, one above the other on concentric drive shafts contra-rotating—spinning in opposite directions on a shared axis—and make yaw changes by increasing the collective pitch of the rotor spinning in the direction of the desired turn while simultaneously reducing the collective pitch of the other, creating dissymmetry of torque.

Tandem-rotor craft (such as in the Boeing CH-47 Chinook) also employ two rotors spinning in opposite directions—termed counter-rotation when it occurs from two separate points on the same airframe—but have the rotors on separate drive shafts through masts at the nose and tail. This configuration uses differential collective pitch to change the overall pitch attitude of the aircraft. When the pilot moves the cyclic forward to pitch the nose down and accelerate forward, the helicopter responds by decreasing collective pitch on the front rotor and increasing collective pitch on the rear rotor proportionally, pivoting the two ends around their common center of mass. Changes in yaw are made with differential cyclic pitch, the front rotor altering cyclic pitch in the direction desired and the opposite pitch applied to the rear, once again pivoting the craft around its center.

Conversely, the synchropter and transverse-mounted rotor counter rotating rotorcraft (such as the Bell/Boeing V-22 tilt rotor) have two large horizontal rotor assemblies mounted side by side, and use differential collective pitch to affect the roll of the aircraft. Like tandem rotors, differential cyclic pitch is used to control movement about the yaw axis.

== See also ==
- Aeronautical engineering
- Autogyro
- Helicopter rotor
