= Goldberg (surname) =

Goldberg is a surname of German or Yiddish origin, meaning 'gold mountain', which is common among Ashkenazi Jews. Notable people with the surname include:

== Architecture ==
- Alan Goldberg (architect), American architect
- Bertrand Goldberg (1913–1997), American architect and industrial designer
- Frank Goldberg, birth name of Frank Gehry (1929–2025), Canadian and American architect and designer

== Business ==
- Arthur A. Goldberg (born 1940), American businessman
- Dave Goldberg (1967–2015), American Internet entrepreneur
- William Goldberg (diamond dealer) (1925–2003), American businessman

== Film, TV, theatre, computer games ==
- Adam Goldberg (born 1970), American actor
- Adam F. Goldberg (born 1976), American screenwriter and producer
- Andrew Goldberg (director) (born 1968), American film producer/director
- Andrew Goldberg (writer) (born 1978), American television writer
- Daniel Goldberg (producer) (1949–2023), Canadian film producer and writer
- Eric Goldberg (animator) (born 1955), American animator
- Eric Goldberg (game designer) (born 1959), American designer of board, role-playing, and computer games
- Evan Goldberg (born 1982), Canadian screenwriter, film producer and director
- Gary David Goldberg (1944–2013), American writer and producer for television and film
- Gina Goldberg (born 1963), Finnish model, actress and singer
- Lester J. Goldberg (1910–1995), birth name of Jerry Lester, American comedian, singer and performer
- Marc Goldberg (playwright) (born 1968), French playwright and theatre director
- Marc Wallice (born Marc Stephen Goldberg, 1959), American porn actor
- Mike Goldberg (born 1964), American sportscaster
- Rube Goldberg (1883–1970), American cartoonist
  - Rube Goldberg machines, funny virtual contraptions imagined by R.G. or in his style
    - Rube Goldberg Machine Contest, annual competition
- Sarah Goldberg (born 1985), Canadian actress
- Whoopi Goldberg (born 1955), American actress

== Literature and journalism ==
- Anatol Goldberg (1910–1982), Soviet-British head of the BBC Russian Service
- Ben Zion Goldberg (1895–1972), Belarusian-American Yiddish journalist
- Bernard Goldberg (born 1945), American writer, journalist, and political commentator and author
- Haim Goldberg: see #Visual arts
- Itche Goldberg (1904–2006), American-Yiddish writer and publisher
- J.J. Goldberg (born 1949), American writer and editor
- Jeffrey Goldberg (born 1965), American author and journalist
- Jonah Goldberg (born 1969), American conservative journalist and pundit
- Joshua Ryne Goldberg (born 1995), American felon, Jewish Neo-Nazi and internet troll
- Kaarina Goldberg (born 1956), Finnish author and journalist
- Leah Goldberg (1911–1970), Israeli poet and writer
- Lucianne Goldberg (1935–2022), American literary agent
- Miriam Goldberg (1916–2017), American newspaper publisher and editor
- Steven Goldberg (1941–2022), American academic and author

== Music ==
- Aaron Goldberg (born 1974), American pianist
- Barry Goldberg (1942–2025), American blues musician
- Ben Goldberg (born 1959), American clarinetist
- Johann Gottlieb Goldberg (1727–1756), German harpsichordist and composer of the late Baroque period
- Reiner Goldberg (1939–2023), German opera singer (heroic tenor)

== Politics and law ==
- Alan Goldberg (judge) (1940–2016), Australian judge
- Arthur Goldberg (1908–1990), American politician and diplomat
- Daniel Goldberg (politician) (born 1965), French politician
- Denis Goldberg (1933–2020), South African anti-apartheid activist
- Karl Raimund Goldberg (1836–1897), mayor of Varnsdorf, Member of the Bohemian Diet
- Marilyn Goldberg, Manitoba judge
- Merle S. Goldberg (1936–1998), American abortion activist
- Richard W. Goldberg (1927–2023), American politician and judge from North Dakota
- Robert D. Goldberg (born 1951), American politician from Rhode Island

== Science and academia ==
- Aaron Goldberg (1917–2014), American botanist
- Adele Goldberg (computer scientist) (born 1945), American computer scientist
- Adele Goldberg (linguist) (born 1963), American linguist
- Alexander Goldberg (1906–1985), Israeli chemical engineer
- Anatolii Goldberg (1930–2008), Soviet-Israeli mathematician
- Andrew V. Goldberg (born 1960), American computer scientist
- David E. Goldberg (born 1953), American computer scientist
- David Theo Goldberg (born 1952), South African professor working in critical race theory, digital humanities, and the state of the university
- Deborah Goldberg, American ecologist
- Emanuel Goldberg (1881–1970), Israeli cinema pioneer, computer pioneer, and inventor in photography
- Ian Goldberg (born 1973), Canadian cryptographer
- Irma Goldberg (born 1871), Russian-born German organic chemist
- Joshua N. Goldberg (1925–2020), American theoretical physicist
- Leo Goldberg (1913–1987), American astronomer
- Michel E. Goldberg (born 1938), French biophysicist
- Murray Goldberg (born 1962), Canadian e-learning pioneer
- Paul Goldberg (geologist), American geologist
- Pinelopi Koujianou Goldberg (born 1963), Greek-American economist

=== Medicine ===
- Abraham Goldberg (1923–2007), British professor of medicine
- Andrew J Goldberg (born 1970), British orthopaedic surgeon
- Billy Goldberg (born 1966), American physician
- David Goldberg (psychiatrist) (1934–2024), British academic and social psychiatrist
- Elkhonon Goldberg (born 1946), American neuropsychologist and cognitive neuroscientist
- Judith Goldberg, American biostatistician
- Lewis Goldberg (1932–2026), American personality psychologist and academic
- Nieca Goldberg (born 1957), American cardiologist

== Sports ==
- Aaron Goldberg (golfer) (born 1985), American golfer
- Adam Goldberg (American football) (born 1980), American football player
- Alan E. Goldberg (born 1949), American horse racing trainer
- Benny Goldberg (1918–2001), Polish boxer
- Bill Goldberg (born 1966), American wrestler, film actor and football player
- Brad Goldberg (born 1990), American baseball player
- Chelsey Goldberg (born 1993), American ice hockey player
- Dan Goldberg (tennis) (born 1967), American tennis player
- Hank Goldberg (1940–2022), American sports commentator
- Jared Goldberg (born 1991), American skier
- Les Goldberg (1918–1985), English footballer
- Mark Goldberg (football manager), English football manager and businessman
- Marshall Goldberg (1917–2006), American football player

== Visual arts ==
- Carin Goldberg (1953–2023), American graphic artist
- Eric Goldberg (artist) (1890–1969), Canadian painter
- Haim Goldberg (1888/1890–1943), Polish-Jewish visual artist, writer and poet
- Michael Goldberg (1924–2007), American abstract expressionist painter and teacher
- Suzanne Goldberg (1940–1999), New Zealand painter
- Thorsten Goldberg (born 1960), German multimedia artist

== Other ==
- Aharon Goldberg, Israeli rabbi convicted of conspiracy to commit kidnapping and murder-for-hire
- Hersh Goldberg-Polin (2000–2024), American-Israeli Hamas hostage
- Joshua L. Goldberg (1896–1994), Belarusian-born American rabbi
- Manfred Goldberg (1930–2025), German-born British Holocaust survivor
- Max Goldberg, creator and owner of YTMND website
- Richard Steve Goldberg (born 1945), American child pornographer
- Werner Goldberg (1919–2004), half-Jewish Wehrmacht soldier, depicted in German WWII newspaper as "The ideal German soldier"; post-war politician

== Fictional characters ==
- Edward Goldberg, in the animated series Drawn Together
- Greg Goldberg, from The Mighty Ducks franchise
- Joe Goldberg, main protagonist of the You book series by Caroline Kepnes, as well as the television series of the same name
- Patrick 'Patsy' Goldberg, in the 1952 novel The Hoods and the 1984 movie Once Upon a Time in America
- Silvia Goldberg, American professional gamer in light novel Shangri-La Frontier.

== See also ==
- David Goldberg (disambiguation)
- Michael Goldberg (disambiguation)
- Goldberg (disambiguation)
- Golberg (disambiguation)
- Goldberger
- Goldenberg
- Harpaz
