= Goldberger =

Goldberger is a surname of Jewish origin. Notable people with the surname include:

- Andreas Goldberger (born 1972), ski jumper
- Arthur Goldberger (1930–2009), economist
- Joseph Goldberger (1874–1929), physician
- Julian Goldberger, film director
- Marvin Leonard Goldberger (1922–2014), physicist
- Paul Goldberger (born 1950), American architecture critic and journalist from New York

== See also ==
- 3101 Goldberger, asteroid
- Goldberg Variations (disambiguation)
- Goldberger–Wise mechanism, in particle physics
- Goldbergturm, the water tower on the Goldberg, Germany
- Goldberger's ECG leads – see ECG#Augmented limb leads
- Goldberg (disambiguation)
- Goldenberg
