= Goldberg =

Goldberg or Goldberger may refer to:

== Arts and entertainment ==
- Goldberg Ensemble, a British string ensemble
- Goldberg Variations, a set of 30 keyboard variations by Johann Sebastian Bach
- Molly (1950 film), a film based on The Goldbergs radio and television series
- The Goldbergs (broadcast series), American radio and television comedy-drama series
- The Goldbergs (2013 TV series), a 2013 American situation comedy
- Maximum Destruction, a monster truck driven by Tom Meents that was originally named for Bill Goldberg

== Companies ==
- Goldbergs, a British department store group that ceased trading in 1991
- Carl Goldberg Products, an American manufacturer of radio-controlled airplane kits
- Spelling-Goldberg Productions, an American television production company

== People ==
- Goldberg (surname), people with the surname Goldberg
- Bill Goldberg, a professional wrestler also known mononymously as Goldberg

== Places ==
- Goldberg, Germany
- Złotoryja, Poland (German: Goldberg)

== Science ==
- Goldberg reaction, in chemistry
- Goldberg–Sachs theorem, a theorem in general relativity
- Goldberg system, a system of plant taxonomy
- Goldberger–Wise mechanism, in particle physics
- Goldberg polyhedron, in mathematics
- Goldberg test, for psychiatric screening

== Other ==
- Goldberg Horror Award, an annual literary award named for D. G. K. Goldberg
- Goldberg machine, any complex apparatus that performs a simple task in an indirect and convoluted way
- Goldberg Magazine, a Spanish-based publication devoted to early and Baroque music
- Goldberg v. Kelly, a 1970 United States Supreme Court case regarding due process
- Rostker v. Goldberg, a 1981 United States Supreme Court case regarding women in the military

== See also ==
- Goldberg Variations (disambiguation)
- Goldbergturm
- Goldenberg
