= List of radio-controlled model aircraft kit manufacturers =

This is a list of notable companies that manufacture Ready To Fly and Almost Ready to Fly airplane kits.

- Airtronics
- Great Planes
- Hangar 9
- Hobbico
- HobbyZone
- ParkZone

== Historical RC plane manufacturers ==
Many notable individuals in the 1960s through the 1990s and beyond created the landscape of modern RC modeling. These included many starting their own companies. The families of many of these individuals lost interest in continuing these businesses. The incoming supply of ARF planes from overseas made it hard to sell kits requiring assembly.

- Carl Goldberg Models
- Name ARF
- Sig Manufacturing

== See also ==
- Thunder Tiger
