= Haggai (disambiguation) =

Haggai is one of the Biblical minor prophets.

Haggai or Hagai may also refer to:

- Book of Haggai, the book of the Bible attributed to the prophet Haggai
- Beit Hagai, officially just Hagai, a religious Israeli settlement in the West Bank
- Hagai Levi, Israeli film and television director
- Hagai Shaham, Israeli violinist
- Hagai Zamir, Israeli paralympic champion
- Haggai Ndubuisi, Nigerian gridiron football player
- Haim Goldberg (1888/1890–1943), Polish-Jewish artist and poet, known by the pen name Haggai
