= Colberg =

Colberg is a surname, and may refer to:

- Frederick Colberg (1900–1965), American welterweight and Olympic boxer
- Jörg Colberg (born 1968), German writer, educator and photographer
- Lawrence Kohlberg (1927–1987), American psychologist, conceiver of a theory on stages of moral development
- Rebekah Colberg (1918–1994), Puerto Rican athlete
- Severo Colberg Ramírez (1924–1990), Puerto Rican politician
- Severo Colberg Toro (born 1953), Puerto Rican politician and attorney
- Talis Colberg, former Attorney General of Alaska

== See also ==
- Bad Colberg-Heldburg, town in Thuringia, Germany
- Battle of Colberger Heide between Sweden and Denmark in 1644
- The House of Colberg, tragedy by the British writer Thomas James
- Kołobrzeg in Poland (formerly known as Kolberg in Pomerania, formerly part of Germany, but sometimes spelled as Colberg)
- Golberg
- Goldberg (disambiguation)
