= Harpaz =

Harpaz (הַרפָּז) is a Jewish surname derived from a Hebraization of German-Jewish Goldberg (literally "gold mountain"). Notable people with the surname include:

- Jacob Harpaz, CEO of ISCAR Metalworking
- Neta Harpaz (1893–1970), a Zionist activist and Israeli politician (born Neta Goldberg)
