= Wings Across America 2008 =

Wings Across America 2008 (WAA-08) was a group of model airplane enthusiasts that flew a battery-powered radio-controlled aircraft (RC), designated as a park flyer, in all 48 contiguous United States with hopes to make all 50, if Alaska and Hawaii could be reached. A park flyer is a small radio-controlled plane typically flown in a field such as a local park or soccer field.

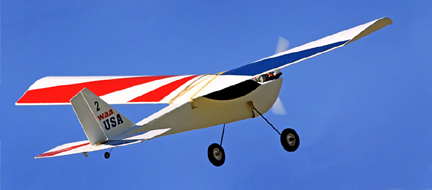
The Official SQuiRT park flyer model that is used in this event

== History ==
Wings Across America 2008 (WAA-08) was the creation of Frank Geisler of Gloucester, Virginia. Frank is an avid RC pilot, USAF veteran and AMA contest director who volunteers his free time to help promote the sport/hobby of radio controlled flying. When Frank discussed this project with some of his friends, it was received with such enthusiasm that the project was born of this energy. All that was needed was to find hundreds of RC pilots across the US in every state willing to fly the plane at their home field and then drive to the next pilot, thus forming a nationwide network of pilots who would fly across America.

Frank used the internet RC forums and emailed Academy of Model Aeronautics chartered clubs in search of volunteers willing to help the project come to fruition. In only 5 weeks from inception, 230 pilots had joined, representing all 48 continental United States.

This type of project had been attempted before. What sets this project apart from all the others ever attempted or completed was that the pilots hand delivered the plane from pilot to pilot; the plane was never shipped by mail to its next destination. In this way a "chain" was created of pilots that personally flew the model, then handed it off to the next pilot, all across the continental United States. In the end, the model airplane flew in all 48 states and covered a distance of over 30,000 miles.The WAA-08 Pilots MapThe WAA-08 Completed Pilots Map

It ended its journey at the home field in eastern Virginia 5 years, 145 days, 21 hours and 50 minutes after it made its maiden flight. Over 340 RC pilots registered to take part in this history making project. 248 Academy of Model Aeronautics (AMA) Chartered clubs hosted the adventure.

All the equipment used for the WAA-08 was donated by the participating pilots. Fortunately, one of the pilots was Bill Stevens, owner of Stevens AeroModels in Colorado Springs, CO. Bill donated a plane called the SQuiRT which stands for Simple, Quiet, Robust, Trainer. This tough little parkflyer was easy to fly and could take the abuse that over 340 pilots would dish out. With Bill's help, Horizon Hobby agreed to donate their newest high-tech radio control system to go along with the plane.

The goal of this event was to help promote model aviation. A sample of one of the videos that helped bring this event to the masses can be found at.

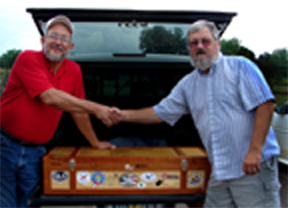
The routing of the plane is handled by Frank Geisler, who e-mails the pilots when they are scheduled to meet the previous pilot of the plane and then fly it themselves.

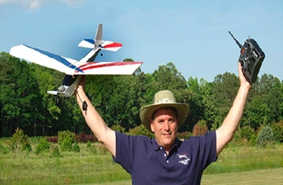
On May 24, 2008, Frank launched the first flight.

The Wings Across America 2008 adventure is over, but its legacy is living on at the National Model Aviation Museum. Use the link to reference WAA-08's outstanding museum display, Pilot's Log Book entries, and more info about the adventure.

== WAA-08 Statistics (current as of 11 October 2013) ==
- 26,587 miles traveled
- 812 pilots have flown the WAA-08 plane
- 230 AMA Chartered clubs visited
- 48 states visited
- 333 registered pilots
- 29 registered pilots in California (the most, followed by NY with 22)
- 1 registered pilot in Delaware and Vermont
- 0 degrees –Coldest temperature that the WAA-08 plane was flown: Richard C (#263) Butte, MT.
- 107 degrees –Hottest temperature that the WAA-08 plane was flown: Mike H (#127) Valley Mills, TX
- 8,500' – Highest altitude flown by the SQuiRT by pilots Rod B (180) & John C (180a) of Dillon, CO.
- 12,000+ emails sent in support of the WAA-08 adventure
- 4,500+ posts on the online RC Forums in support of the WAA-08 adventure
- 112,490 hits on our WAA-08 Google Maps page
- 205 pages of notes taken recording my personal experiences and important events of the WAA-08 adventure

=== Major events attended ===
- Kitty Hawk, NC 17 Aug 2013
- The Joe Nall 11–18 May 2013
- Southeast Electric Flight Festival (SEFF) 22–28 April 2013
- National Electric Fly In (NEFI) 11 Jun 2011
- Western States Electric Fun Fly (WSEFF) 4–6 June 2010
- Dallas Electric Aircraft Fliers (DEAF 23) 27–28 September 2009
- Southeast Electric Flight Festival (SEFF) 1–3 May 2009
- Northeast Electric Aircraft Technology (NEAT) 12–14 September 2008

=== The oldest and youngest pilots ===
- Youngest Female: Nicole Hansen 8
- Youngest Male: Evan Holman 6
- Oldest Female: Carol Bershers 68. Marva Clingaman also admits she is at least 68.
- Oldest Male: Bill Baily: 97

=== Club with the most WAA-08-pilots ===
- Hampton Roads R/C Club (53) coordinated by Sam Verlander pilot #404
- Tri-County R/C Club (30) Coordinated by Scott Saxon pilot #398
- Monroe County RC Club (23) Coordinated by Mike Friesel pilot #359
- Tarheel R/C Flyer (22) Coordinated by Mike Then pilot #397
- Toledo Weak Signals (17) Coordinated by Charles Hainy pilot #346
- Prop Floppers (15) Coordinated by Kent Clingaman pilot #347
- Hawks R/C Junior Aviators (10) Coordinated by Tim Pease pilot #64
- South Bend Radio Control Club (10) Coordinated by Terry Rensberger pilot#339

=== Most flights in a single day ===
- 69 on 31 August 2013

=== News coverage ===
- 33 Online news stories
- 30 Local papers
- 6 nationally publicized magazines have run articles on the WAA-08 adventure
- 6 Local television news broadcasts
- 1 Local radio show
- 1 Parade (Logan County Fair Parade)
- 1 Weekly RC Podcast that provides WAA-08 updates

=== Forum members ===
- 135 on RC Groups
- 33 on WattFlyer
- 2 on RC Universe
- 2 on Flying Giants

== Plane statistics ==
- Plane: Simple Quiet Robust Trainer (SQuiRT)
- Wingspan: 38"
- Motor: GWS sp400 (1st one replaced after 215 flights)
- ESC: Spectrum 18 Amp from Medusa Research
- Batteries: MaxAmps 1100 mAH 7.4V 25C LiPos
- Props: GWS 7x3.5
- Receiver: Spektrum AR6100e
- Servos: 2 Ea Hitec HS-55
- Radio: Spektrum DX6i
- Battery Charger: Cellpro 4s from FMA Direct
- AUW: 16 ounces
- Built from: Balsa and vinyl covering
- Manufacturer: Stevens AeroModel
- Year Built: 2008

== Sponsors ==
- Stevens AeroModel
- Horizon Hobby
- Redneck RC
- SuperFly RC (Tram)
- Big Al's Hobby Supply
- RC Pro Racing
- MaxAmps
- Hobby Hangar
- Castle Creations
- Grumpy Monkey Designs
- E Cubed R/C
- FliteLine Hobbies
- R/C FlightCast
- Vinyl For RC
- Medusa Research Inc.
- Nico Hobbies
- Al's Bicycles and Hobbies
- Steve Cranford (WAA-08.org Domain creator)
- Desert Eagles Model Airplane Flying Club

== Gallery ==
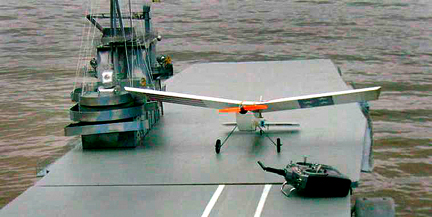
"Doolittle Raid" Memorial Celebration, the SQuiRT pays tribute in Columbia, SC. Flown by "Wings Across America 2008 (WAA-08)" pilot Jerry Branch on 3/12/2009.

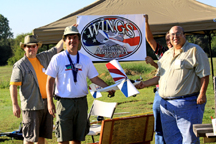
''Dallas Electric Aircraft Fliers (DEAF 23)'' September 27–28, 2009 Dallas, Texas

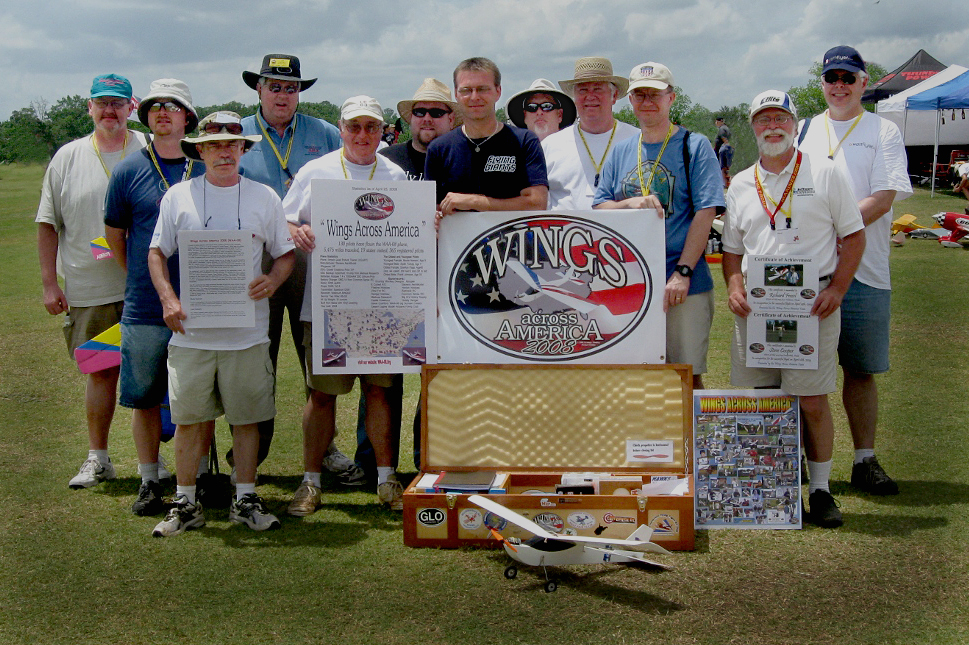
Southeast Electric Flight Festival (SEFF) May 1–3, 2009 Andersonville, Georgia

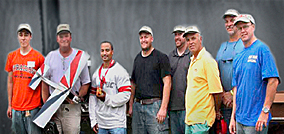
Northeast Electric Aircraft Technology (NEAT) September 12–14, 2008 Downsville, New York. Western States Electric Fly June 11, 2010

== Academy of Model Aeronautics (AMA) ==
Founded in 1936, the Academy of Model Aeronautics (AMA) is the world's largest sport aviation organization, representing a membership of more than 150,000 for the purpose of promotion, development, education, advancement, and safeguarding of modeling activities. AMA is the voice of its membership, providing liaison with the Federal Aviation Administration, the Federal Communications Commission and other government agencies. AMA also works with local governments, zoning boards, and parks departments to promote the interests of local chartered clubs. AMA seeks to introduce young men and women to the art and craft of aeromodeling. Through an active educational outreach program, AMA supports teachers and community-based organizations who wish to infuse topics in math, science, and technology with aviation activities. (www.modelaircraft.org or call 800-435-9262)

== Online web pages ==
The following sites published articles on the WAA-08 Wings Across America adventure

- Aero News
- EAA Young Eagles
- Derry News (Pilot #45)
- The Valley News (Pilot #64)
- The Jackson Herald (Pilot #84)
- WLTX.com (Pilot #92)
- The Joplin Globe (Pilot #144)
- Mt. Shasta News (Pilot #244)
- Woodburn Independent (Pilot #248)
- The Outlook (Pilot #250)
- The News Tribune (Pilot #259/260)
- Tri-City Herald (Pilot #259/260)
- WGHP Fox8 (Pilot #395/395)

== Published articles ==
- Jackson Herald newspaper, Ripley, WV December 30, 2008
- Columbia WLTX TV & newspaper, Columbia, SC March 12, 2009
- Joplin Globe newspaper, Joplin, MO August 7, 2009
- Backyard Flyer magazine, June 28, 2009
- FlyRC" magazine July 2010 issue #80
