= Goldberg test =

- Purpose: used to assess mental health

Goldberg test may refer to any of various psychiatric tests used to assess mental health in general or as screening tools for specific mental disorders e.g. depression or bipolar disorder. Goldberg, after whom some psychiatric tests are named, might be one of two psychiatrists who share the same last name: Ivan Goldberg, an American psychiatrist, and Sir David Goldberg, a British psychiatrist. Psychiatric screening tests generally don't substitute getting help from professionals.

== Tests developed by Ivan K. Goldberg ==
- Goldberg Depression Test is an 18-question screening tool for depression.
- Goldberg Mania Scale is an 18-question screening test for mania.

== Tests developed by Sir David Goldberg ==
- General Health Questionnaire or Goldberg Health Questionnaire (GHQ) developed in 1972 in its initial format as a 60-question test (GHQ-60) with a four-point scale for each question. It is used to measure the risk of developing psychiatric disorders. Other forms of GHQ are: GHQ-30, GHQ-28 and GHQ-12.
- Together with Simpson, they developed Personal Health Questionnaire (PHQ) in 1995. It is a 10-question screening instrument for depression. It should not be confused with the 9-question patient health questionnaire (PHQ-9) developed by Spitzer also to quantify the risk for depression. Personal Health Questionnaire is sometimes abbreviated as PHQ-G to differentiate it from PHQ-9.
