= HobbyZone =

HobbyZone is a brand of electric-powered radio controlled aircraft, car, and boat models distributed by Horizon Hobby of Champaign, Illinois.

Originally a line consisting solely of R/C aircraft, the brand name is a reference to one of three skill levels necessary to fly the various models. All HobbyZone aircraft are sold as a fully assembled, ready-to-fly package which includes all necessary accessories and batteries. Except for the Firebird Commander, the aircraft are patterned around the same basic design which is that of a high wing, experimental-style "pod and boom" blow-molded plastic fuselage with a direct-drive pusher propeller and v-tail.

Skill level number one or "Z1" are two-channel aircraft aimed at first-time flyers who have had little or no experience with radio controlled aircraft and whose operation can be self-taught. The hand-held transmitter controls throttle and rudder only; climb and descent are strictly a function of throttle position. These models incorporate Horizon Hobby's proprietary "Smart-Trak" mixing system which automatically adds a small amount of "up elevator" in turns, thus keeping the nose up and avoiding loss of altitude. The Super Cub is the only three-channel "Z1" aircraft. "Z2" aircraft are three-channel craft which add the third dimension of controllable pitch and are intended for more experienced pilots, but can be learned by first-time pilots with the assistance of an experienced pilot. "Z3" aircraft are high-performance three-channel craft and are geared toward intermediate to advanced pilots. Most models regardless of skill level are equipped with the unique "X-Port" accessory receptacle which allows the addition of accessories such as a "bomb" drop, parachute drop, high-intensity white LED lighting for night operation, or a sonic pulse "gun" which allows for air-to-air combat with similarly equipped HobbyZone and ParkZone models. The gun emits a sonic pulse which briefly disables the stricken aircraft's drive motor. Models equipped with the "Multi-Mode" system can be flown in beginner mode with limited control surface throws and rudder/elevator mixing or "sport" mode which allows full control surface throw.

Some HobbyZone products include the patented Anti-Crash Technology which utilizes special optical sensors that detect both sky and ground. Should the plane enter a dive, the system automatically applies counter-control to reduce the likelihood of a crash. It also detects and avoids overcompensation of the controls, one of the leading causes of crashes by inexperienced pilots. As skills develop, the ACT is easily disabled by pulling the throttle stick downward and holding it for three seconds. The plane beeps twice to signify the ACT is turned off. Rearming the ACT is accomplished in the same manner and will cause the plane to beep once. Arming and disarming the ACT can be done in flight if desired.

HobbyZone's Champ S+ model has an optional first person view kit, allowing the pilot to view their flight as they would if they were inside the plane.

The second plane to incorporate ACT is the three-channel Firebird Freedom which features a two-piece wing with larger surfaces, a much more powerful 480-series motor with seven-cell power, and steel pushrods to manipulate the control surfaces.

HobbyZone introduced their first scale model in 2006. The three-channel, 480-powered Super Cub RTF incorporates ACT technology for novice pilots in a larger, more powerful package than ParkZone's intermediate J-3 Cub.

== Zone 1 aircraft ==
- Super Cub RTF (ready-to-fly)

Wingspan: 47.75 in (1219mm)

- Mini Super Cub RTF (ready-to-fly)

Wingspan: 31.8 in (805 mm)

- Firebird Stratos

Wingspan: 42.0 in (1070 mm)

- Firebird Commander RTF

Wingspan: 40 in (1016 mm)

- Firebird Commander 2 RTF

Wingspan: 42.25 in (1073 mm)

- Champ RTF

Wingspan: 20.3 in (515mm)

== Zone 3 aircraft ==
- Aerobird Xtreme RTF(Historically existed)

Wingspan: 55 in (1397 mm)

- Glasair Sportsman RTF(New released)

Wingspan: 54.6 in(1390 mm)

== Surface models ==
- Mini Mauler 1/20 scale monster truck
- Zig Zag Racer 2 miniature power boats
- M1A1 Abrams tank
