= Park flyer =

Small radio-controlled aircraft

This Grand Wing Servo-Tech Slow Stick is an example of an indoor/outdoor park flyer

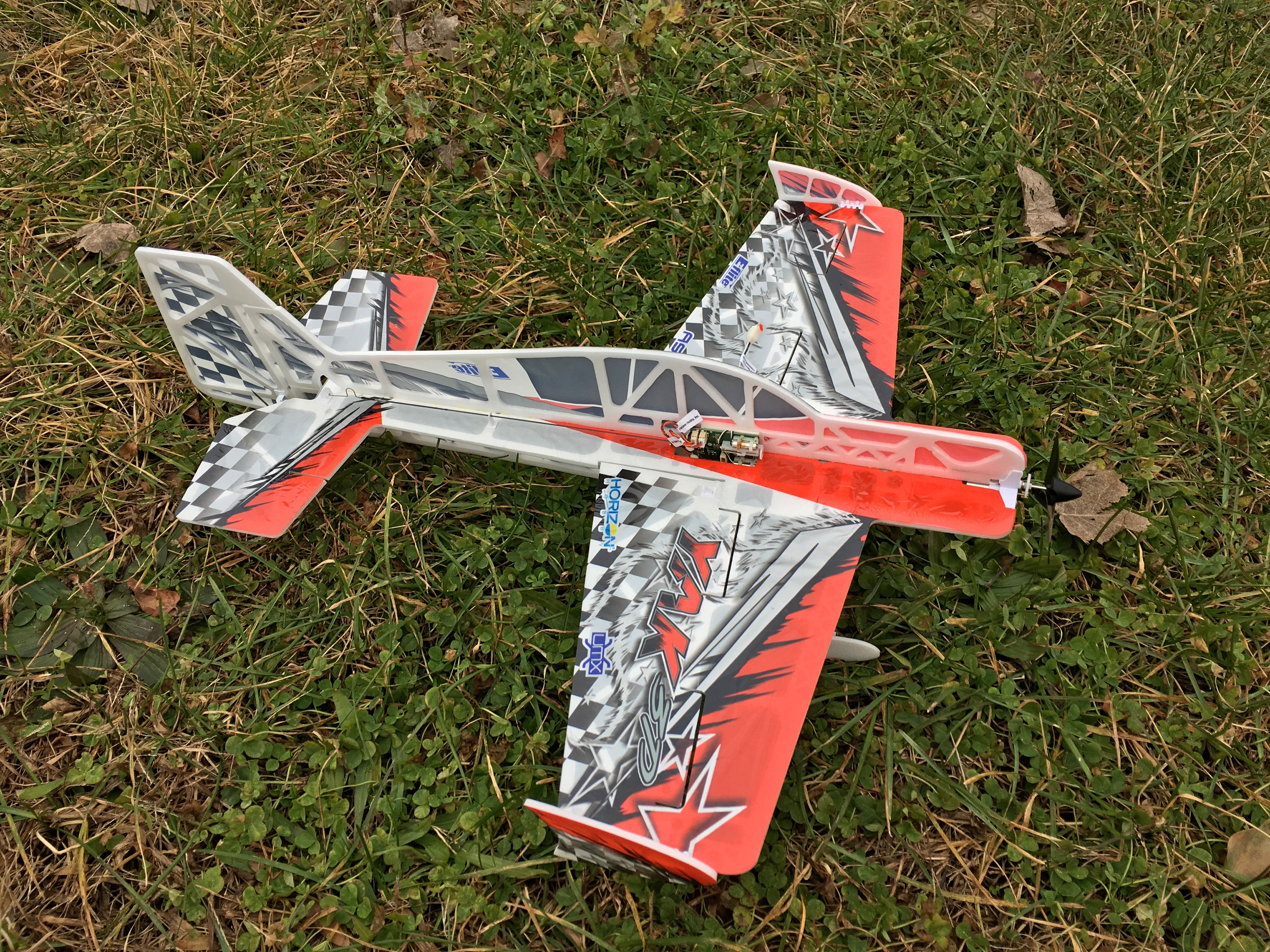
E-flite UMX Yak 54 3D

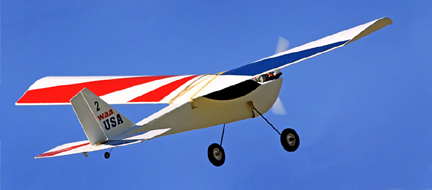
The Official SQuiRT park flyer model used in the Wings Across America 2008 event

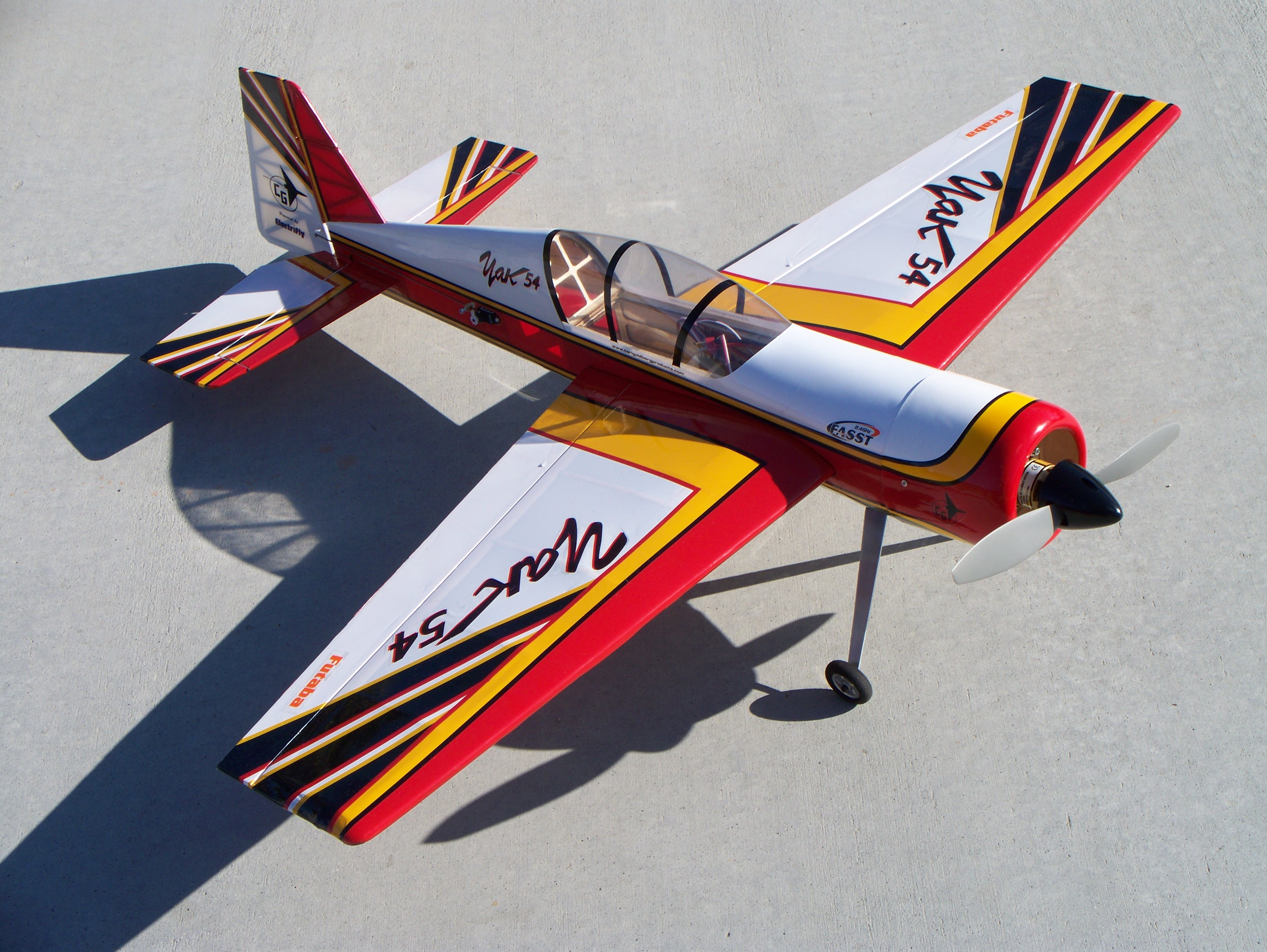
This Carl Goldberg Products model of a Yakovlev Yak-54 is an example of a high-performance, fully aerobatic park flyer-class plane

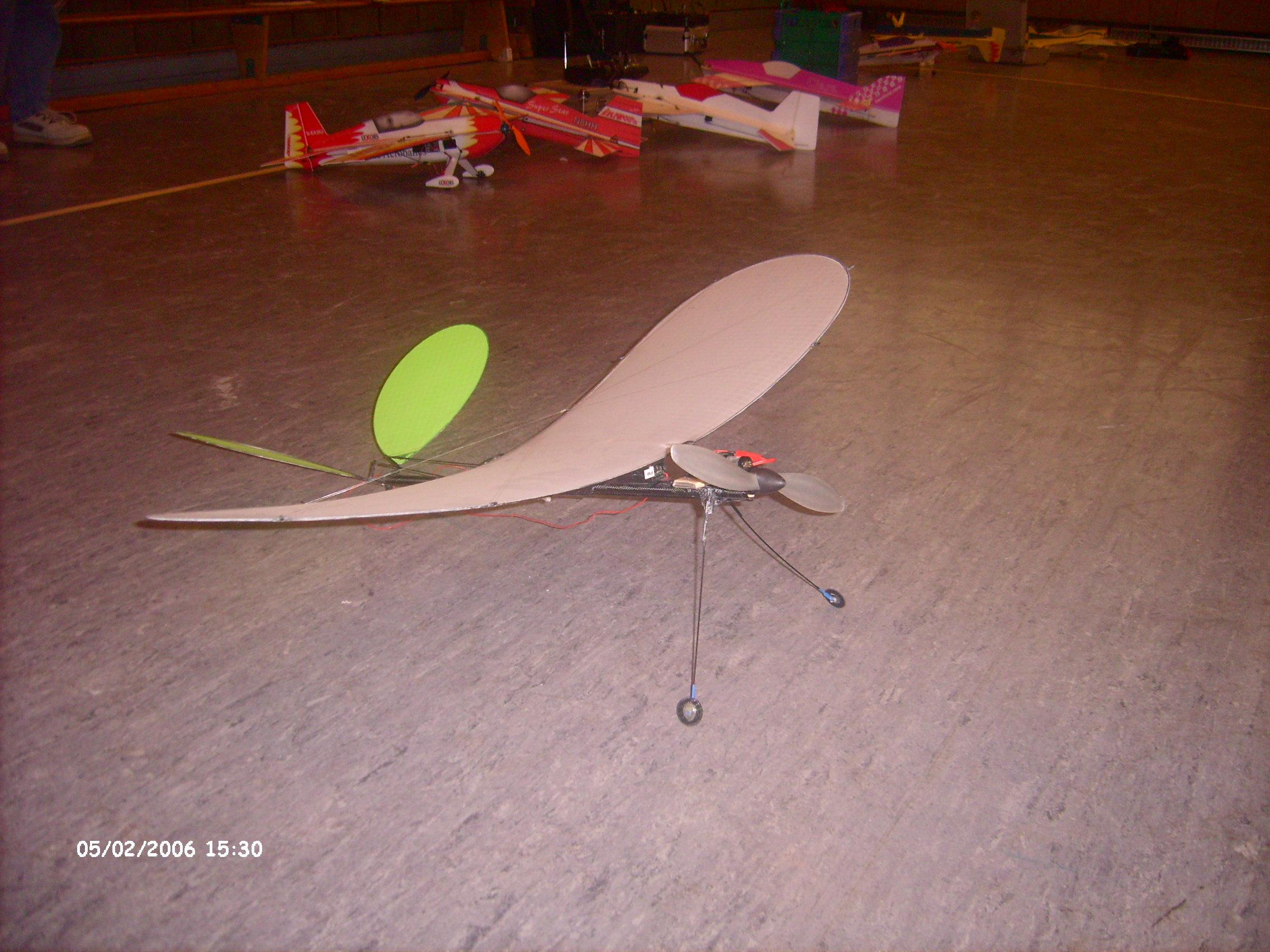
Braun Model Technik Stubenfliege indoor flyer

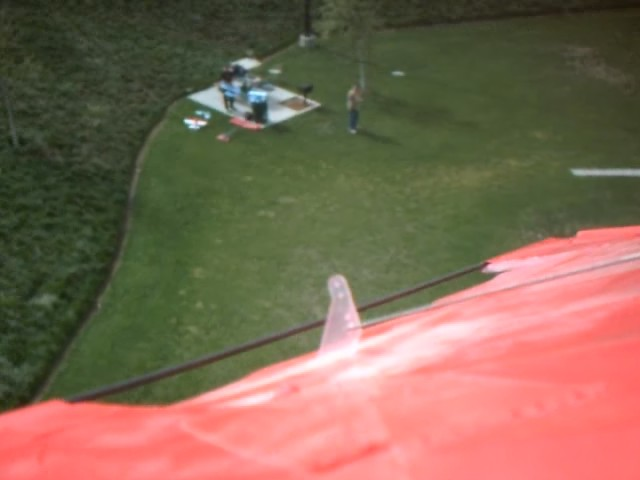
Aerial photography from a low-alt park flyer

Park flyers are a class of small, primarily electric-powered radio-controlled aircraft. The smallest class of park flyers are called micro planes, and are capable of being used in an enclosed area such as a gymnasium or a living room, while larger park flyers are usually flown at designated park flyer sites. Models with low flying speed are more susceptible to wind and turbulence. Park flyers weigh no more than 2 pounds (0.91 kg), allowing park flyers to have a speed limit of less than half of the current wind speed.

Even after serious crash damage, the aircraft's components tend to still be repairable. They may be flown in residential areas because of their modest size and silent operation. Clubs exist to assist newcomers and offer details on suitable takeoff spots.

== Types of park flyers ==
Ready-to-fly (RTF) park flyers require no construction or installation. Users may need to perform basic assembling to fly the aircraft. Almost ready to fly (ARF) park flyers require construction and installation of different parts by the users.

Advanced electronic and material technologies have aided in the development of high-performance, park flyer sized “3D-flyers”, or fully aerobatic aircraft capable of extreme high g maneuvers and nose-up hovering.

== SQuiRT ==
During the 2008 Wings Across America event(WAA-08), a project began to fly the SQuiRT park flyer across the 48 contiguous states of the U.S. The model plane began its journey in Virginia, making its way across the U.S. through in-person handoffs. As soon as one pilot finished flying the plane at their home airfield, they would drive to the next destination to hand it off. 5 years later, in 2013, it made it back to its home airfield in Virginia. Shortly thereafter, it was donated to the AMA museum in a small ceremony.

== Safety ==
Certain park flyers (especially small delta-wings) can fly at a dangerous speed, which may cause injuries to passers-by. A standard precaution is keeping an appropriate distance from the public. The Academy of Model Aeronautics recommends a minimum safe distance of at least 50 feet (15.24 m) from any spectators other than the pilot.

== See also ==
- RC Aircraft Kit Manufacturers
