= Samuel Goldenberg =

Samuel Goldenberg may refer to:

- Samuel Goldenberg (actor) (1883/1884–1945), actor in Yiddish theatre
- Samuel Löb Goldenberg (1807–1846), Austrian Hebraist and editor
- "Samuel Goldenberg and Schmuÿle", sixth movement of Modest Mussorgsky's 1874 piano suite Pictures at an Exhibition
