= Golberg =

Golberg is a surname. Notable people with the surname include:

- Aleksandr Golberg (1879–1919), Russian anarchist politician
- Argo Golberg (born 1982), Estonian runner
- Mécislas Golberg (1869–1907), Polish French philosopher and anarchist
- Pål Golberg (born 1990), Norwegian cross country skier

== See also ==
- Colberg
- Goldberg (surname)
