= Goldenberg =

Goldenberg is a surname of Ashkenazi Jewish origin. Notable people with the surname include:

- Billy Goldenberg (1936–2020), American composer
- Carl Goldenberg (1907–1996), Canadian lawyer & politician
- Charles Goldenberg (1911–1986), American football player
- Chelli Goldenberg (born 1954), Israeli actress, writer & blogger
- Eddie Goldenberg (1948–2026), Canadian political advisor
- Edward Goldenberg Robinson (1893–1973), American film actor (given name Emanuel Goldenberg; became Edward G. Robinson)
- Edward Goldenberg (1948–2026), Canadian policy advisor to the Prime Minister
- Efraín Goldenberg (1929–2025), Peruvian politician
- Grigory Goldenberg (1856–1880), Russian revolutionary
- Isidor Goldenberg (1870-?), Romanian actor & singer
- Larry Goldenberg (born 1953), Canadian medical researcher
- Michael Goldenberg (born 1965), American writer
- Richard Goldenberg (1947–2023), French chess master
- Samuel Goldenberg, several people
- Suzanne Goldenberg, Canadian-born journalist
- William Goldenberg (born 1959), film editor

== Other ==
- Goldenberg scandal, a political scandal in Kenya involving the Goldenberg International company
- Goldenberg Candy Company, a subsidiary of the Just Born company

== See also ==
- Goldberg (disambiguation)
- Golden (disambiguation)
