= Neta Harpaz =

Israeli politician (1893-1970)

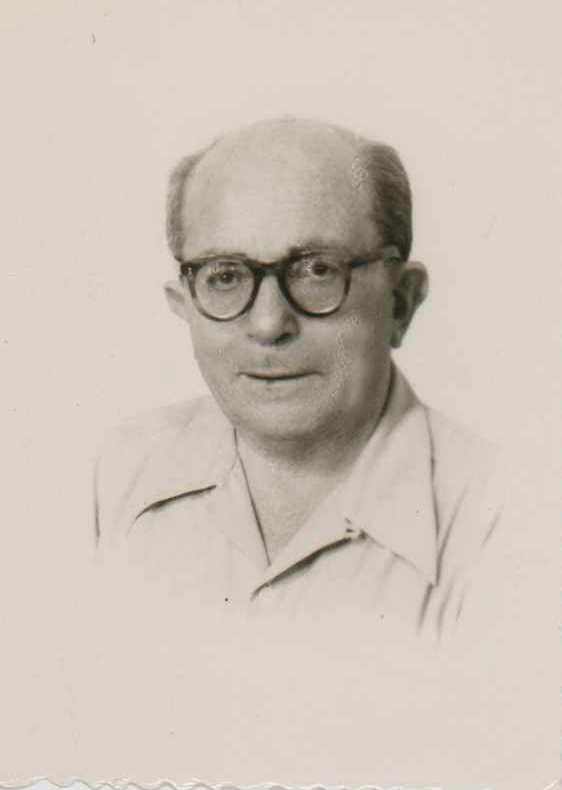

Faction represented in the Knesset
- 1949–1951: Mapai

Personal details
- Born: 1893 Kosów Lacki, Russian Empire
- Died: 11 October 1970 (aged 76–77)

Neta Harpaz (Hebrew: נטע הרפז; 1893 – 11 October 1970) was a Zionist activist and Israeli politician.

== Biography ==
Born Neta Goldberg in the village of Kosów Lacki near Siedlce in the Russian Empire (today in Poland), Harpaz was educated in a heder and yeshiva. He emigrated to Ottoman-controlled Palestine in 1909. He joined the Poale Zion party, and in 1914 was elected to the central committee of Hapoel Hatzair. In 1919 he was amongst the founders and leadership of Ahdut HaAvoda (amongst Eliahu Golomb, Schlomo Kaplanski, and David Bloch), and also helped establish the Histadrut trade union. Harpaz was also a member of Po'alei Tzion. He was also a member of the Provisional World Council for HeHalutz, and in 1926 became a member of the Agricultural Association and its director of the Department of Villages. He helped unionise workers in agricultural villages, and was amongst the founders of the Yakhin and Hekel food processing factories.

He served as a delegate to the Assembly of Representatives and was a member of the Jewish National Council. In the elections to the first Knesset in 1949, he was elected on the Mapai list. He lost his seat in the 1951 elections and died in 1970.
