= Samuel Löb Goldenberg =

- שמואל יהודה לייב גאלדענבערג
- Born: 1807; Bolechow, Galicia, Austrian Empire
- Died: 11 January 1846 (aged 38–39); Tarnopol, Galicia, Austrian Empire
- Writing career
- Language: Hebrew

Samuel Löb Goldenberg (Yiddish: שמואל יהודה לייב גאלדענבערג; 1807 – 11 January 1846) was an Austrian Hebraist and editor.

He was the founder and editor of the Hebrew periodical Kerem Ḥemed, noted for the thoroughly scientific character of its reading-matter. Among its contributors were Solomon Judah Rapoport, Nachman Krochmal, Leopold Zunz, Hayyim Selig Slonimski, Samuel Pineles, S. D. Luzzatto, Reggio, Abraham Geiger, Isaac Erter, Samuel Byk, Tobias Feder, Joseph Perl, and Aaron Chorin. The spirit of criticism and historical investigation manifested in all their articles dealt a blow in Galicia to Ḥasidism, which had formerly counted among its followers many of the contributors to the Kerem Ḥemed.
