= Carl Goldberg Products =

US radio-controlled airplane kit manufacturer

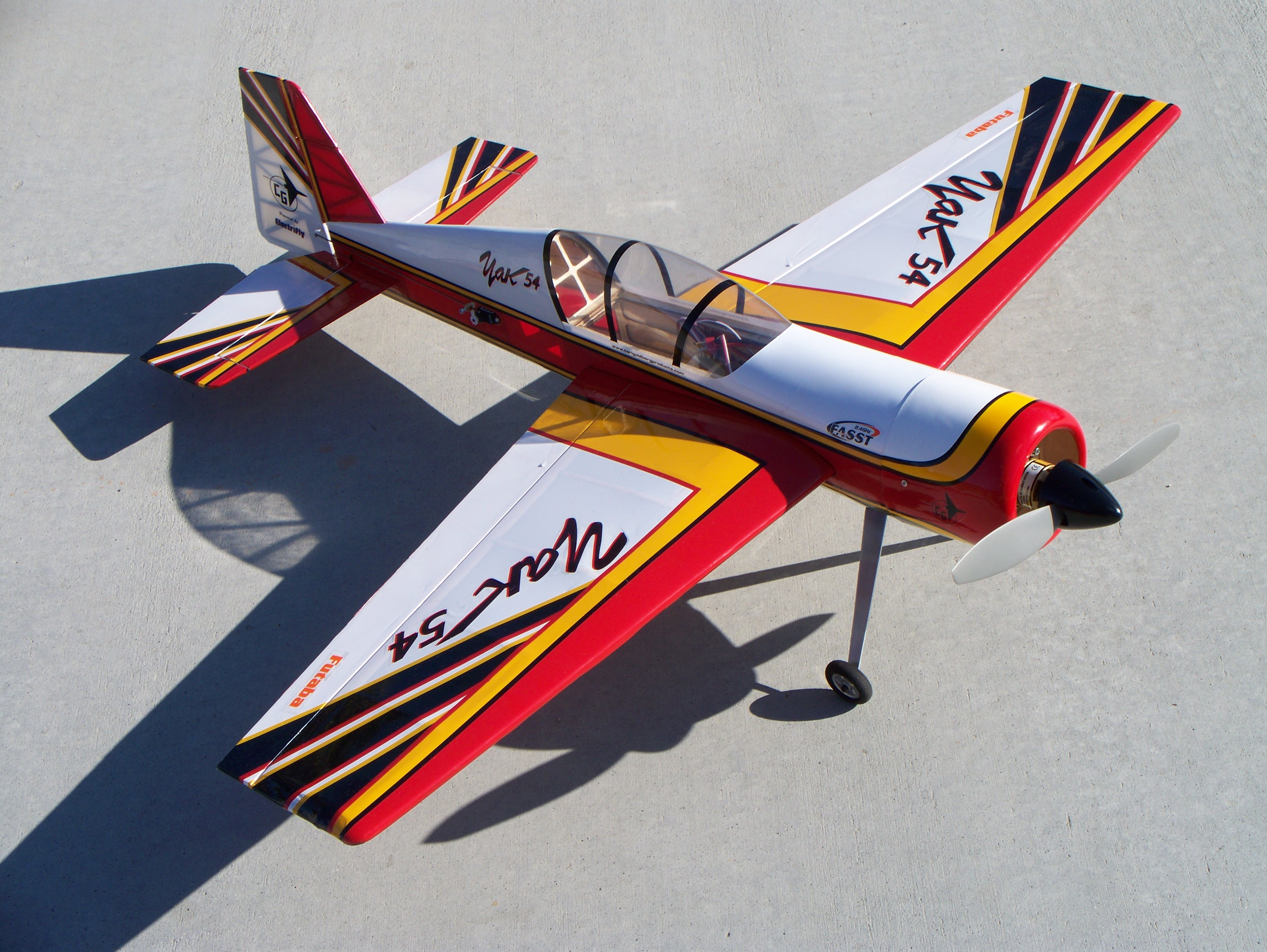
This Carl Goldberg Products model of a Yakovlev Yak-54 is an example of a high-performance, fully aerobatic park flyer-class plane

Carl Goldberg Products is a Champaign, Illinois-based manufacturer of radio-controlled airplane kits and Almost Ready to Fly models.

== History ==
The company was formed by Carl Goldberg (1912–1985) in 1955.

Carl Goldberg Models manufactures radio-controlled (RC) aircraft and components. This company was purchased by Great Planes Model Manufacturing on August 24, 2007. The model shown on the right was in production during negotiations and is considered to be either the last model produced under the previous owner or the first under the new one; it was released in December 2007.

On January 10, 2018, it was announced that parent company Hobbico had filed for Chapter 11 bankruptcy protection. In June 2018, it was announced that Hobbico had filed for Chapter 7 bankruptcy and went into liquidation.

== Models ==
- Eagle 2
- Eaglet 50
- Tiger 2
- Tiger 60
- Falcon 56
- Falcon 56 Mark II
- Falcon EP
- Jr. Falcon
- Jr. Skylark
- J3 Cub
- Piper J-3 25yr Anniversary Edition
- Piper J-3 25yr Anniversary Edition Floats
- Super Chipmunk
- Ultimate 10-300
- Gentle Lady Glider
- Sophisticated Lady Glider
- Electra
- Mirage 550
- Freedom 20
- Protege
- The Extra 300
- Sky Tiger
- Skylark 56
- Skylark 56 Mark II
- Skylark 70 ARF
- Sukhoi SU26MX
- Sr. Falcon

The Bucker Jugmann

The Staudacher S-300 GS

== Related ==
The Academy of Model Aeronautics established the "Carl Goldberg Vital People Award" to recognize contributions to model aviation.
