= Thorsten Goldberg =

German multimedia artist

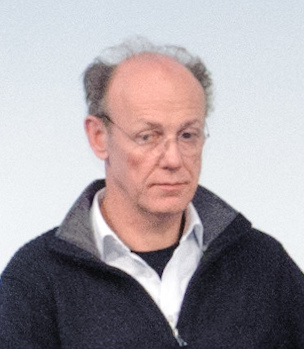
Thorsten Goldberg

Thorsten Goldberg born 26 December 1960 in Dinslaken is a German multimedia artist.

== Life ==
From 1982 to 1991 Thorsten Goldberg studied sculpture at the State Academy of Fine Arts in Stuttgart in the class of Inge Mahn. In 1991 he won the first prize of the Forum of Young Art for his photographic work, "Class of 97" with exhibition stations at Kunsthalle Kiel, Kunstverein Mannheim, Kunstmuseum Wolfsburg, Württembergischer Kunstverein Stuttgart and Staatliche Kunsthalle Baden-Baden. Along with the screenwriter Wieland Bauder he created the fictional character Thomas Bauer for joint artistic performances. When Thomas Bauer received the scholarship for photography by the Berlin Senate in 1991, he then took part in the art exhibition “Art on a world scale” at the Kunsthalle Kiel in 1993. Since 1995 and in addition to photographs and video works Thorsten Goldberg has been creating site-specific works and public art. He realized numerous projects in public space throughout Germany, in Poland, Norway and Canada and taught at various academies. 2003 - 2008 he was Adjunct Professor for Art in Public Space at the Art Academy Linz/AT and 2007 - 2009 Professor (repress.) for arts and media at the Muthesius Art Academy Kiel/Germany.

As a member of different committees and advisory boards he is involved in the election and organisation of competitions for art in public. Thorsten Goldberg is Initiator and Co-Publisher of „Public Art Wiki“, a Germany-wide internet archive for art in public space in the German-speaking-area (http://www.publicartwiki.org) He is also Co-Publisher of „Kunst in der Großsiedlung (art in the large-housing-area) Marzahn-Hellersdorf“ a printed documentation of more than 460 public works and author of several texts on public art.

Thorsten Goldberg lives in Berlin/Germany.

== Selected permanent and temporary works ==
Cities are all in Germany unless otherwise noted.

Year	Location	Venue	Type	Exhibition	Notes	Ref
1985	Stuttgart	Kuenstlerhaus	Solo	media exposure		
1989	Stuttgart		Solo	half the rent		
1991	Stuttgart		Public space	going home, being home, staying home	10 billboards	
1992	Stuttgart	Württembergischer Kunstverein	Solo	one weekend		
1993	Berlin	Wohnmaschine Galerie Friedrich Loock	Solo			
1993	Kirchheim	Gallery Noeth	Solo	Glamor and Misery		
1993	Kiel	Kunsthalle Kiel	Public space	International sculpture		
1994	Berlin	Wohnmaschine Galerie Friedrich Loock	Solo			
1995	Heidenheim	Museum of Fine Arts	Solo	schmutz		
1996	Hellersdorf		Permanent installation	reichweite, griffhoehe		
1996	Berlin	Wohnmaschine Galerie Friedrich Loock	Solo	remotes		
1996	Berlin	Senate of Culture	Solo	senatorial chair		
1996	Münster	Wewerka Pavillon	Solo	birdies		
1997	Lüdenscheid	Central Square	Public space	big game (hunt)	Collaboration with A. Kaufmann and B. Reitermann)	
1997	Berlin		Permanent installation	Rock-Paper-Scissors	Randomized neon signs as a permanent marking of the former frontier crossing point	
1997	Berlin	Wohnmaschine Galerie Friedrich Loock	Solo	birdies inside		
1998	Heidenheim	Kunstmuseum Heidenheim	Permanent installation	Once very much of all	Sculpture and planting in Levillain-Park	
1998	Wiesbaden	Bellevuegallery	Solo			
1999	Wiesbaden	Gallery Hafemann	Solo			
2000	Wiesbaden		Public space	Hunger and Thirst, Cola and Sausage	Intervention with three singers, sculpture project	
2000	Potsdam		Public space	stand-by Potsdam	Horizontal gas flame on a chimney of a fallow industrial area	
2001	Bergkamen-Heil		Temporary sculpture	concierge	Brick doorpost with integrated plate and entryphone	
2001	Warsaw, Poland	XX1 Gallery	Solo			
2002	Eberswalde	State Hospital	Permanent installation	curtain mov.	Slow moving curtain, kinetic installation	
2002	Eberswalde	State Hospital	Permanent installation	finger walks	Video installation on 5 large TFT Panels	
2002	Münster	Exhibition Hall	Solo	detached village		
2002	Wiesbaden	Gallery Hafemann	Solo			
2002	Marseille, France	Gallery RLBQ	Solo	generic profile		
2002	Berlin	Gallery HO	Solo	HEINZGERDKURTKLAUS		
2003	Berlin	Unter den Linden	Public space	milk & honey	Historical map of the land of milk and honey as a large back light display	
2004	Heidenheim	Hauptstraße	Public space	next stop - milk & honey	Historical map of the land of milk and honey as a large back light display	
2005	Wismar		Public space	Wismar depot	Neon writing on a shallow storage building in the old harbour	
2005	Barcelona, Spain	Fundació Joan Miró - Espai 13	Solo	things are generally different behind closed doors		
2006	Wiesbaden		Temporary installation	Rivers of wine and beer	Neon sculpture	
2006	Berlin	Charité Hospital	Public space	Inventory	Historical busts and bases	
2009	Lippstadt	Lichtpromenade-Lichtkunst-Skulpturenpfad	Public space	Cumulus 08.07	Neon-sculpture	
2010	Berlin	WHITECONCEPTS	Solo	Constructing clouds		
2010	Berlin	Potsdamer Strasse	Public space	die Potsdamer	film production Horsewoman	
2010	Berlin	Federal Ministry of Food and Agriculture	Public space	Cumulus Berlin	Sculpture	
2010	Ratingen	Museum for History of the City	Public space	milk & honey		
2012	Bergen, Norway		Public space	60°N 05°E (encased waterside)	Land art and light sculpture	
2012	Neumünster	Herbert-Gerisch Sculpture Park	Public space	Cumulus 11.08	Sculpture	
2012	Neumünster	Herbert-Gerisch Sculpture Park	Solo	54°4 min.		
2013	Viersen	Municipal Gallery	Solo	51°15 min.		
2013	Gdańsk, Poland	Laznia Centre for Contemporary Art	Solo	54°24 min.		
2013	Gdańsk, Poland	Nadmorski Park	Public space	And honey upon hawthorn grows	Sculpture	
2014	Radom, Poland	Mazovia Region Centre of Contemporary Art “Elektrownia”	Public space	Radom Cumulus	Light sculpture made of 19 layers of curved neon contours	
2015	Bonn	Kreuzbauten, Federal Ministry for Digital and Transport	Public space	reflected ministry	Interactive video projections	
2016	Neuhausen	Technisches Hilfswerk	Public space	20.000 Morgen	32 silver-plated landscape-models at a scale of 1:50.000 for the new building of a guest house	
2017	Orońsko, Poland	Center of Polish Sculpture	Public space	The opera ain’t over till the fat lady sings	Sculpture	
2017	Orońsko, Poland	Center of Polish Sculpture	Solo	Constructing Clouds		
2018	Berlin-Marzahn-Hellersdorf		Public space	24 kt	A bird's nest, cast of fine gold and a contract serve as a foundation for a new primary school	
2020	Edmonton, Canada	North East Transit Garage	Public space	53°30’N	Five topographic models of mountain landscapes	

== Works in public collections ==
- The city of Gdańsk, Poland
- The Mazovian Centre of Contemporary Art – Elektrownia in Radom, Poland
- The City of Bergen, Norway
- The Land of Berlin
- The German Federal Ministry of Transport, Building and Urban Development
- The German Federal Ministry of Education and Research (BMBF) in Bonn
- The City of Lippstadt
- The City of Heidenheim
- The Charité University Clinicum in Berlin
- The Martin-Gropius-Hospital in Eberswalde
- The Daimler Art Collection in Berlin
- The Art-Museum in Heidenheim
- Herbert-Gerisch Foundation in Neumünster
- The collection Stefan Haupt in Berlin
- The City of Edmonton, Canada

== Publications ==
- 1992 - Hans-Peter Feldmann, Preface, catalogue: Goldberg, Württembergischer Kunstverein Stuttgart
- 1995 - René Hirner, catalogue: schmutz, Goldberg, Bauder, Kunstmuseum Heidenheim
- 2002 - Christoph Tannert, means against amnesia, catalogue: Thorsten Goldberg, Münster ISBN 3-935730-05-5
- 2002 - Martin Henatsch, moments of fragility, catalogue: Thorsten Goldberg, Münster ISBN 3-935730-05-5
- 2002 - Frédéric Bussmann, rock-paper-scissors in: Kunst in der Stadt, Skulpturen in Berlin, edited by H. Dickel, U. Fleckner, Nicolai Verlag, Berlin ISBN 3-87584-399-1
- 2004 - Montse Badia, on milk and honey, Thorsten Goldberg's Utopia Station, in catalogue: Werk 04, Heidenheim Sculpture Symposium ISBN 3-929935-23-6
- 2007 - Katharina Klara Jung, Milk + Honey +, in catalogue: Show me the way to public sphere, Wiesbaden 2006, ed office for Art and Public, M. Henatsch, Münster and Department of Culture, Wiesbaden, Kerber Verlag
- 2008 - René Hirner, The receipts 93-08 in: TIEFENRAUSCH, Volume 2 - rapture of the deep, edited by OK Center for Contemporary Art, Upper Austria ISBN 978-3-85256-462-3
- 2012 - Dr. Martin Henatsch, Eulalia Domanowska, Jadwiga Charzynska, Kristin Danger, Nicole Loeser, catalogue: 54°4MIN., DISTANZ Verlag ISBN 978-3-942405-78-2
