= Michael Goldberg =

Michael Goldberg may refer to:

- Michael Goldberg (painter) (1924–2007), American abstract expressionist painter and teacher
- Michael Goldberg (screenwriter) (1959–2014), American screenwriter
- Michael Goldberg (writer) (born 1953), American journalist and novelist
- Michael Goldberg (sports executive) (1943–2017), executive director of the National Basketball Coaches Association
- Michael Goldberg (mathematician) (1902–1990), American mathematician who defined the Goldberg polyhedron
- Michael Lawrence Goldberg (born 1981), American film producer
- Mickey Goldberg (born 1941), American neuroscientist
- M. J. Goldberg, alternative cartoonist

== See also ==
- Mike Goldberg (born 1964), American play-by-play commentator
