= ParkZone =

ParkZone was a brand specializing in intermediate-level, radio-controlled electric model aircraft. It was created and distributed by Horizon Hobby, an American hobby manufacturer based in Champaign, Illinois, United States. The term "park flyer" inspired the brand name, signifying compact models suitable for flying in parks.

The ParkZone lineup featured various scale aircraft models, including the P-51D Mustang, F4F Wildcat, F4U Corsair, and Spitfire, alongside non-scale sport aircraft.

ParkZone aircraft and other park flyers opted for lithium polymer batteries due to their superior energy density, lighter weight, and extended lifespan. These batteries, popular in portable electronic devices, contributed to enhanced performance and agility in radio-controlled aircraft, offering longer flight times.

As of 2004, ParkZone offered through its website the following aircraft models: Typhoon 3D, P-51D Mustang, Super Decathlon, J-3 Cub, F-27B Stryker and Slo-V. The website also offered add-on accessories and parts for these aircraft, with the claim that these aircraft and parts offered high quality fun with no hassle.

Parts and add-on accessories by aircraft
	J-3 CUB	F-27 STRYKER	SLO-V	SUPER DECATHLON	P-51D MUSTANG
Wings	PKZ1108 wing hold down roads PKZ1120 wing PKZ1122 wing struts		PKZ1320 wing kit PKZ1318 wing/pushrod bracket	PKZ1408 wing hold down rods PKZ1420 wing PKZ1422 wing struts	PKZ1520 painted wing (no servo)
Tails	PKZ1124 complete tail with accessories	PKZ1220 vertical fins	PKZ1324 tail set PKZ1326 tail mount set	PKZ1424 complete tail with accessories	PKZ1524 horizontal stab
Props and related parts	PKZ1001 prop with spinner PKZ1104 prop shaft with hardware PKZ1128 complete gearbox	PKZ1002 prop for 7- and 8-cell batteries	PKZ1003 prop with spinner PKZ1304 prop shaft with gear PKZ1328 complete gearbox	PKZ1001 prop with spinner PKZ1104 prop shaft with hardware PKZ1128 complete gearbox	PKZ1005 propeller PKZ1504 prop shaft with hardware PKZ1507 spinner PKZ1528 gearbox with firewall
Chargers	HBZ1026 1.2A variable rate DC pk	HBZ1026 1.2A variable rate DC pk	HBZ1026 1.2A variable rate DC pk	HBZ1026 1.2A variable rate DC pk	PKZ1519 1.8A variable rate DC pk
Batteries	PKZ1021 8.4V 600mAh Ni-MH	HBZ1012 7.2V 900mAh Ni-MH HBZ1013 8.4V 900mAh Ni-MH PKZ1013 9.6V 900mAh Ni-MH	PKZ1021 8.4V 600mAh Ni-MH PKZ1025 7.2V 600mAh Ni-MH	PKZ1021 8.4V 600mAh Ni-MH	PKZ1027 10.8V 1000mAh Ni-MH
Rubber bands	PKZ1110		PKZ1310	PKZ1410	
Landing gear	PKZ1106		PKZ1306	PKZ1406	
Other parts	PKZ1112 battery door with latch	PKZ1212 battery hatch PKZ1213 hatch set PKZ1215 nose PKZ1234 motor count	PKZ1314 carbon fuse with tray	PKZ1412 battery door with latch	PKZ1512 battery door with latch
X-port accessories		HBZ4020 Sonic Combat Module HBZ4025 Stealth Target w/Sensor	HBZ6023 Aerial Drop Module HBZ4020 Sonic Combat Module HBZ4025 Stealth Target w/Sensor HBZ3510 Night-Flight Module		HBZ6023 Aerial Drop Module HBZ4020 Sonic Combat Module HBZ4025 Stealth Target w/Sensor

HobbyTown USA, a franchise retailer of hobby and remote control products, recognized ParkZone as the "Hobby Company of the Year" in 2005.

The "Bind N' Fly" or "BNF" purchasing option facilitated aircraft ownership for Spektrum transmitter owners, allowing easy binding without the need for an additional transmitter or receiver crystal.

On September 1, 2009, when an unknown pilot flew a ParkZone Sukhoi Su-26m model onto the field during a baseball game at Dodger Stadium. This emphasized the importance of responsible hobbyist practices to prevent disruptions and accidents.

The ParkZone model lineup once offered a variety of options, including the Sukhoi SU-29MM, Sport Cub, Artizan, Fw 190 A-8, T-28 Trojan, Radian, and Radian Pro. Additionally, they introduced the "Ultra-Microline," featuring small-sized radio-controlled aircraft designed for indoor or small outdoor flying.

Over time, ParkZone discontinued several models, such as the Typhoon 3D sport plane, Super Decathlon, Bf 109, Fw 190, Cessna 210, Citabria, Etomic Vapor slow flyer, and Slo-V slow flyer. Reasons for discontinuation varied, ranging from the completion of production cycles to low sales or parts availability issues, aligning with a strategic focus on more popular and profitable models.

Horizon Hobby has discontinued the ParkZone brand, though some of their popular models, such as the Cub, have been rebranded under E-flite.

As of August 7th 2024, the URL that used to correspond to ParkZone's original website now redirects to a page in Horizon Hobby's website . The page in question does not currently offer full model aircraft for sale, only parts and accessories such as the PKZ6528 motor mount or PKZU2229 bottom fin set, among others.

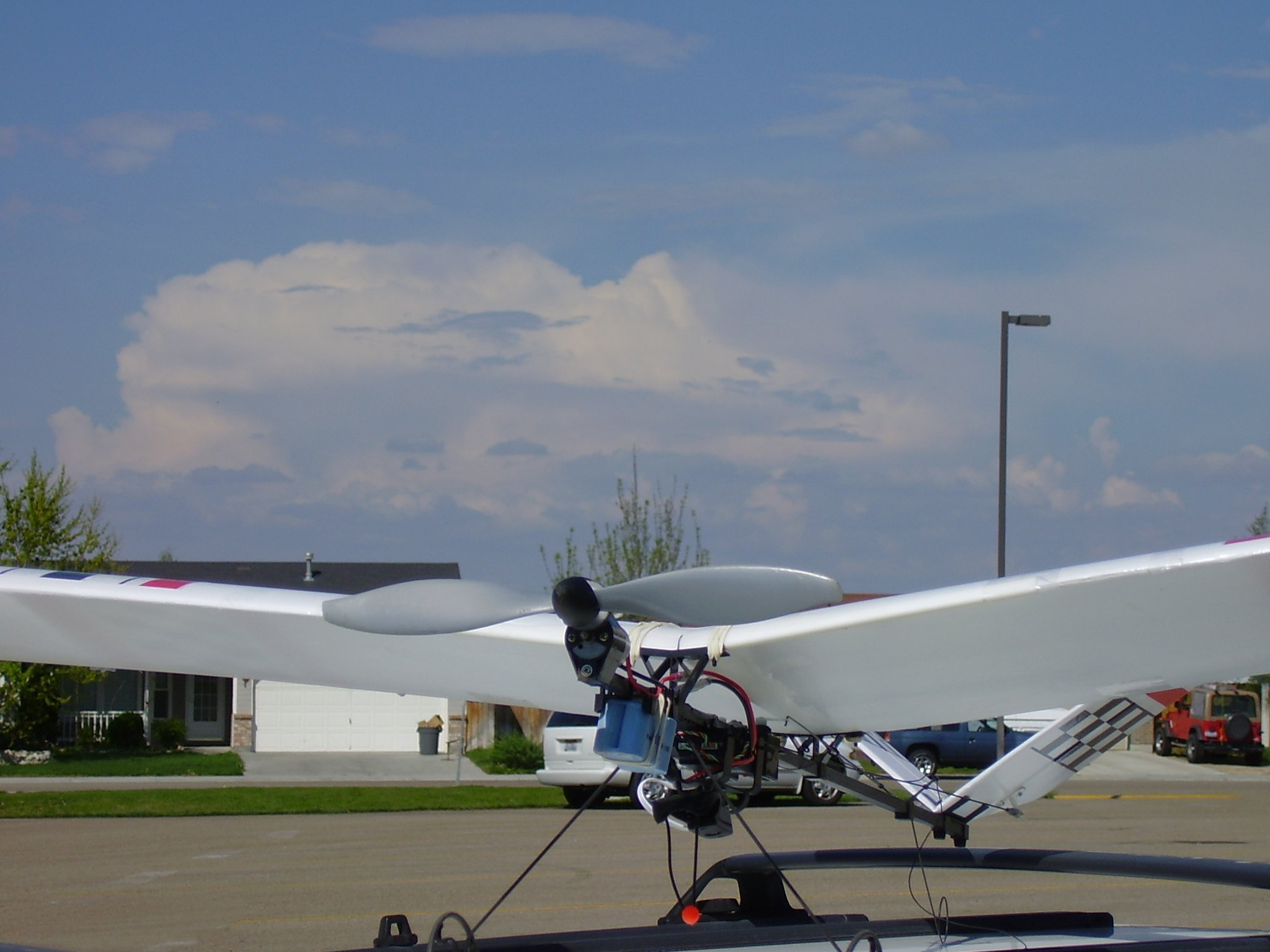
ParkZone Slo-V
