= Judith Goldberg =

American biostatistician

Judith D. Goldberg is an American biostatistician and a professor in the New York University Grossman School of Medicine. Her research interests include the statistics of medical tests used for screening and medical diagnosis, clinical trials, and observational studies.

== Education and career ==
Goldberg studied biostatistics at the Harvard School of Public Health, earning a master's degree in 1967 and completing her doctorate (Sc.D.) in 1972. After three years as a research statistician for the HIP Health Insurance Plan of New York, she became an assistant professor of biostatistics at the Mount Sinai School of Medicine from 1975 to 1983.

From 1983 to 1995, she worked at Lederle Laboratories, in the pharmaceutical division of American Cyanamid, as executive director of statistics and data management. After American Cyanamid was purchased, broken up, and reorganized in the mid-1990s, she became vice president for biostatistics and data management for Bristol Myers Squibb from 1995 to 1999.

In 1999 she returned to academia, as founding director of the Division of Biostatistics in NYU Langone Health, and as a professor in the Departments of Population Health and Environmental Medicine. She continued as director of biostatistics until stepping down in 2013.

== Recognition ==
Goldberg was elected as a Fellow of the American Statistical Association in 1991, and as a Fellow of the American Association for the Advancement of Science in 1992.

She was the 2015 recipient of the Janet L. Norwood Award for Outstanding Achievement by a Woman in the Statistical Sciences, given annually by the School of Public Health of the University of Alabama at Birmingham.
