= Goldberg Variations (disambiguation) =

The Goldberg Variations are a musical composition by Johann Sebastian Bach.

Goldberg Variations may also refer to:

- Bach: The Goldberg Variations (Glenn Gould album) (1956)
- The Goldberg Variations (Uri Caine album) (2000)
- The Goldberg Variations (ballet), a 1971 ballet by Jerome Robbins
- Goldberg Variations (play), a 1991 play by George Tabori
- "The Goldberg Variation" (The X-Files), a 1999 episode of The X-Files
- Goldberg Variations, a collaboration between Mathis Mootz and Maxim Anokhin

== See also ==
- Goldberg Variations discography
