= Haim Goldberg =

Polish-Jewish visual artist, writer and poet (1888/1890–1943)

- Born: Haim Goldberg; 1888 / 1890; Łuków
- Died: 1943; Białystok Ghetto (or Treblinka)
- Known for: Painting, Sculpture and engraving
- Spouse: Esther Goldberg
- Children: Max Goldberg

Haim Goldberg (Hebrew: חיים גולדברג; Yiddish: גאָלדבערג; 1888 or 1890, Łuków, Siedlce Governorate, Russian Poland – 1943, Białystok Ghetto), also known by the artistic name Haggai (Hebrew: חַגַּי), was a Warsaw Jewish-Polish graphic designer, photographer, illustrator and printer, as well as a Yiddish and Hebrew writer and poet.

== Biography ==
Haim Yisroel Goldberg was born in the town Łuków in Siedlce Governorate, Russian Poland (nowadays in the Lublin Province in Poland) in a Hasidic family, the son of Feige (née Nissenbaum) and Zalman Goldberg. He received a traditional Jewish education and studied in a yeshiva in his hometown, but as he showed artistic talents, he left it and went to Germany to study art in workshops and art schools. In 1912 he returned to Poland, to the city of Warsaw, and opened a photographic studio. Before long he was hired by the publishing house "Yehudiya", owned by the Yiddish daily Haynt, as a graphic designer in order to produce greeting cards and postcards. Goldberg created colored cards, using a composite method, creating his own style in this niche of Jewish art. First he photographed in his studio staged scenes portrayed by amateur actors, along with appropriate clothing and setting, and then he used painting and graphics techniques to add the pictures illustrated elements and short Yiddish rhymed greetings he composed. Thus he created series of popular postcards in various themes – Shana Tova ('Happy New Year') greeting cards, postcards depicting Jewish occupations, etc. Shalom Sabar, scholar of Jewish art and folklore, defines Goldberg as "perhaps the most important of Shana Tova greeting cards designers operat[ing] in Poland at the beginning of the 20th century... While he was not an artist of the first rank, his diverse talents as photographer, amateur painter, graphic designer and even an occasional poet have found a suitable platform in the form of greeting cards designing. Before printing the final version, Goldberg added to the photograph of the staged scene produced in his studio the last details: drawing necessary elements, retouching, the words 'Shana Tova' ('for a good year') and finally a decorative plate embedded with light rhymes 'explaining' the image."

In those years he also issued humorous collections and leaflets for Jewish holidays (yontev bleter), in the artistic name "Haggai". Beginning in the end of the 1910s, he illustrated a series of Yiddish and Hebrew children's books published in Warsaw, including the Hebrew illustrated children's library Shibolim ('ears') – a series of 70 illustrated, dotted booklets, most of which were adapted folktale (E. Gitlin, beginning of the 1920s); Agadot Yavan ('Legends of Greece', i.e., Greek mythology; 3 vols., E. Gitlin, 1922) – in Hebrew, adapted by Eliezer Mitropolitnsky, and a simultaneous Yiddish edition translated by H.Z.: grikhishe mitn; the "Tarbut"'s Hebrew toddler's library Tsil Tslil, which he also designed and printed; and the Hebrew reader Tsafririm by Itzhak Katzenelson and Itzhak Berkman (Ahisefer, mid-1920s). He also painted many title pages, like the title page of Yosef Ravin's children's series Maysehlekh fun der gantser velt ('tales from around the world'; E. Gitlin, mid-1920s) and that of the 2nd Haynt's jubilee book (1938).

In the 1920s Goldberg opened in Królewska street in Warsaw a printing house and artistic zincography studio named "Grafikon". In the workshop, where he worked alongside his wife Esther, he designed Hebrew fonts, printing ornaments and lithography and made matrices for a number of publishing houses and newspapers. Apart from his fondness for rhyming and painting title pages, Goldberg had a special affection for making letters. He aspired to improve the Hebrew typography (especially in the context of the Jewish print in Poland), because he thought it flawed and believed it impaired the enjoyment of reading, and sought to come up with a new script that would fit the living word. In 1922 he published an article in Kultur Lige's bibliographic journal Bikher-velt ('Book World') on the need for reform and modernization of the Hebrew font. He spent considerable effort making sketches for letters. His drafts, which he published in Hebrew and Yiddish periodicals, demonstrated great imagination.

In the 1930s he published poems and stories in Hebrew and Yiddish in children's periodicals such as Olami hakatan ('My Little World'). His poems and stories were also published in books, some of which he himself illustrated and printed with his typographic innovations. Goldberg was a founding member of and active in the Association of Visual Artists of the Jews in Poland.

Goldberg aspired to publish Yiddish books in a European style, in a small edition, accompanied by original artwork by renowned Jewish artists. In 1931 he himself published a monograph on the artist Moshe Appelbaum, accompanied by high-quality reproductions. In 1935 the Paris publishing house "Le Triangle", which specialized in Jewish art, published an album consisting of 50 of his paintings on Jewish themes, with an introduction by the French art critic Paul Fierens. The reviews praised the graphical quality of it, and despite the specific theme, Goldberg's paintings were modernist, as well as romantic-realistic.

During the German invasion of Poland in September 1939, Goldberg managed to escape to the city of Białystok, which was occupied by the Soviet Union. He lived there during the Soviet occupation and worked in zincography. After the occupation of Bialystok by the Germans in 1941 he was interned in the Białystok Ghetto. There he was in charge of the drawing of the Judenrat's formal posters, which were made into elegant paintings and hung on the Council's Building.

Haim Goldberg perished in 1943 in the Białystok Ghetto (according to another source, in Treblinka). His wife Esther (b. 1900) also perished in the Holocaust, as well as their only son, Max (b. 1919), who had followed in his parents' footsteps and studied graphics and artistic photography at the Vienna Höhere Graphische Bundes-Lehr- und Versuchsanstalt (according to a rumor, he died as a partisan).

An album was found among the ruins of the Warsaw Ghetto, containing 32 of Goldberg's postcards printed by "Yehudiya" in Warsaw in 1912–1918. The pictures are kept in the collection of the National Library of Poland.
