= Goldbergturm =

Water tower in Sindelfingen, Germany

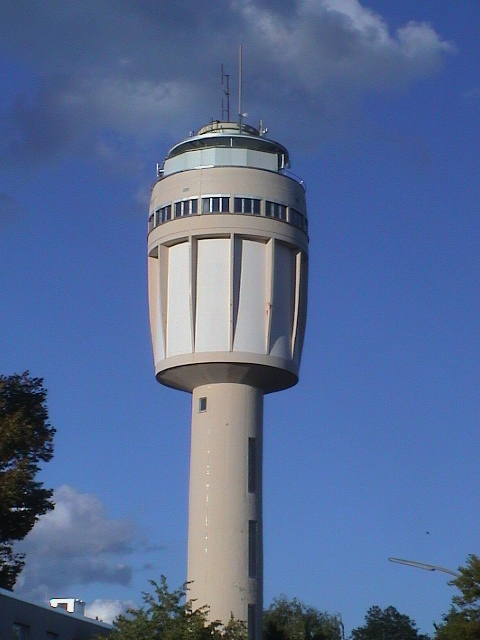
Goldbergturm

The Goldbergturm is a 51 metre high water tower on the Goldberg (gold mountain) at 48°42′06″N 9°01′03″E in Sindelfingen, Germany. The Goldbergturm was built in 1963 and has, in its basket, besides a water reservoir, a restaurant from which a stairway runs to its open-air observation deck.
