= Ted Longshaw =

British businessman, involved in radio controlled car racing

1st [[President of IFMAR]]
- In office 9 July 1979 (46 years ago) – 1995
- Succeeded by: John D. Grant

1st [[President of BRCA]]
- In office 1971–? Serving with Keith Plested

2nd [[President of EFRA]]
- In office 1977?–1983

Personal details
- Born: Oswald Edgar Longshaw; 13 April 1926 South London, England
- Died: 6 September 2011 (aged 85)
- Spouse: Linda Longshaw (until 2011, his death)
- Occupation: Hobby shop owner
- Nickname: Ted

Military service
- Branch/service: Royal Navy
- Years of service: 1943–1946
- Rank: Leading Signalman
- Unit: 27th Destroyer Flotilla
- Battles/wars: World War II; Operation Meridian

Oswald Edgar "Ted" Longshaw (13 April 1926 – 6 September 2011) was a British businessman who is best known for his involvement in radio-controlled car racing and the foundation of governing bodies for the sport, IFMAR (international), EFRA (Europe), FEMCA (far east) and BRCA (UK).

== Early life and military career ==
Longshaw left school at 14 to work for his father, a delivery van driver who operated in Peckham.

During the Second World War, on his 17th birthday in 1943, Ted enlisted with the Royal Navy where he first undertook his basic naval training at HMS Royal Arthur, Skegness; then was based at HMS Scotia, Doonfoot specialising as a signalman. By 1944, as Signalman 1st Class, he joined HMS Wager, a newly built W class destroyer, serving there for 21 months and graduating to Leading Signalman by 1945.

Following training on board Wager, Longshaw served at the Indian Ocean and Pacific Ocean, supporting Fleet Air Arm's participation of Operation Meridian and subsequently escorted HMS King George V in Guam.

During the final stage of the war, Longshaw was temporarily transferred to its sister ship HMS Whelp, serving with the future Prince Philip, Duke of Edinburgh who were both present during the Japanese surrender and returned to Portsmouth in January 1946.

== Later life and radio-controlled car racing ==
After being demobilisation in the late 1940s, Longshaw undertook a career in laundry engineering, setting up his own successful company.

Longshaw also became involved in the model car industry with his son. He took part in the first radio-controlled car meet in England for l:8th scale cars on Easter Monday of 1971, which led him to form the British Radio Car Association that year. That led him to fly overseas to the United States to take part in the ROAR Open National Championship at the Briggs Cunningham Museum, California. He returned to the same championship in 1974 and 1975 and attempted to persuade American drivers to compete in Europe without success. As president of EFRA, he persuaded European drivers to compete in California in 1977. In response to his request, racer John Thorpe agreed to allow ROAR to host races on his circuit, and Longshaw organised the race.

Beside the twenty plus European drivers taking part, the rest of the field consisted of expatriates. It was then agreed afterward that the next world championship was to be held in Europe in 1979 but Monaco wanted to hold a round in 1978 but took a compromise with the EFRA and agreed to hold a World Cup race there that year.

Following a world championship round in Geneva, as a number of clubs and organizations had previously advertised their meeting as a world championship round with their own rules, Longshaw called a meeting of thirty people involved in the industry with the intention to create a world governing body that would not only establish a uniform set of rules, it would establish the prestige of a single World Championship round every two years.

Longshaw retired from his position as president in EFRA in 1983 and IFMAR in 1995, remaining at the latter as an honorary president where he remained active in the sport and attending meetings.

Longshaw also ran his eponymous model shop, Ted Longshaw Model Cars serving as a UK agent for Novarossi, Associated Electrics and Mugen Seiki, closing the business down to focus on his other interests.

Longshaw also served as the Master of the Worshipful Company of Launderers between 1989 and 1990 and was in 2010, a captain of his golf club near Downe, Kent, his hometown where he lived with his wife, Linda, held a position of Company Secretary up to his passing at his home on 6 September 2011 at 85 having suffering from respiratory problems for a long period of time. Longshaw was given a private cremation service on 21 September followed by a memorial service.
