= International Federation of Model Auto Racing =

World governing body of professional radio controlled car racing

- Sport: Radio-controlled racing
- Jurisdiction: International
- Abbreviation: IFMAR
- Founded: 9 July 1979 (47 years ago)
- President: Eric Anderson
- Chairman: Sander De Graaf (IC); Frank Mostrey (EP)
- Secretary: Carlos Gomez

Official website
- www.ifmar.org

2005 1:10 Electric Off Road 2WD Winner Neil Cragg (center), Ryan Cavalieri (left), and Ryan Maifield.

The International Federation of Model Auto Racing (IFMAR) is the world governing body of professional radio controlled car racing.

The organization was created in 1979 by professional racer and RC model entrepreneur Ted Longshaw. At that time, many different governing bodies operated under their own rules throughout the world. IFMAR was conceived as a way to bring the different, fragmented organizations under a single, governing body. IFMAR's constitution also promotes international friendship and sportsmanship.

Each of the member blocs organises the IFMAR World Championship event on behalf of IFMAR.

Masami Hirosaka is perhaps the world's most distinguished racer. He has a record of 14 IFMAR World Championships, followed by Lamberto Collari with 9 titles, all within a single category and in nitro powered cars.

== Governing bodies ==
IFMAR governs RC racing through four international governing bodies, or "blocs" representing 45 member nations and with full voting rights:

- European Federation of Radio Operated Model Automobiles (EFRA) – Oversees racing in Europe.
- Far East Model Car Association (FEMCA) – Governs Australasia and Asia.
- Remotely Operated Auto Racers (ROAR) – Oversees and promotes races in Canada and the United States of America and is credited with producing more world champion drivers than any other bloc.
- Fourth Association of Model Auto Racing (FAMAR) – The newest IFMAR bloc and oversees Argentina, Brazil, Colombia, Ecuador, Mexico, Peru, South Africa, Uruguay, Chile and Venezuela.

== Secretariat ==
=== Presidents ===
#	Name	Nationality	Term
1.	Ted Longshaw	United Kingdom	1979–1995
2	John D. Grant	Australia	1995–2005
3	Erhard "Dallas" Mathiesen	Sweden	2005–2018
4	Jeff Parker	United States	2018–2023
5	Eric Anderson	United States	2023–

== Eligibility to IFMAR World Championship event ==
To be allowed to compete in an IFMAR World Championship event, the competitor has to be a member of a national body (such as ROAR of North America, SARDA from South Africa, BRCA from the United Kingdom, etc.). The competitor has to contact a representative of the body who will determine if they are competent enough to compete in the world championship round. The driver does not specifically have to have qualified in that discipline in which they choose to race (e.g. a driver who is competent in 1:10 on road racing wishes to qualify for 1:8 off-road).

== IFMAR World Championships ==
The following Worlds are held bi annually by IFMAR.

Power	Surface	Scale	Drive	Class	1st Held	Title
Electric	Track	1:12		Modified		
Electric	Track	1:12		Stock		
Electric	Track	1:10	2WD	Touring Car		
Electric	Offroad	1:10	2WD	Buggy	1985	IFMAR 1:10 Electric Off-Road World Championship(s)
Electric	Offroad	1:10	4WD	Buggy	1985	IFMAR 1:10 Electric Off-Road World Championship(s)
Electric	Offroad	1:8	4WD	Buggy	2025	
IC	Off Road	1:8	4WD	Buggy	1986	IFMAR 1:8 IC Off-Road World Championship
IC	Track			GT		
IC	Track	200mm		Nitro Touring		

== IFMAR World Championship Winners ==
Year	Bloc	Scale	Class	Name	Car–Motor	Venue	Location
1977	ROAR	1:8	Sport IC Track	(United States) Butch Kroells	Associated RC100 – K&B	Thorp Raceway	Pomona, California (United States)
1977	EFRA	1:8	Group C IC Track	(Italy) Michele Baruzzi (Italy) Lamberto Collari (Italy) Massimo Fantini			Türkheim (Germany)
1978	EFRA	1:8	Formula IC Track (Note: Considered as a "World Cup" round, not as a World Championship.)	(England) Phil Greeno	PB9 International – K&B	Port Hercules	Monte Carlo (Monaco)
1979	EFRA	1:8	Sport IC Track	(United Kingdom) Phil Booth	PB9 International – OPS	Circuit Micro-Racing	Geneva (Switzerland)
1980	EFRA	1:8	Formula IC Track	(Italy) Giulio Ghersi	PB9 International	Port Hercules	Monte Carlo (Monaco)
1981	ROAR	1:8	Sport IC Track	(United States) Arturo Carbonell	Delta Super J – Picco	Castleton Square	Indianapolis, Indiana (United States)
1982	ROAR	1:12	Electric Track Stock	(United States) Kent Clausen	Associated RC12i – Yokomo 05S	Grand Hotel	Anaheim, California (United States)
1982	ROAR	1:12	Electric Track Modified	(United States) Arturo Carbonell	Delta Super Phaser – Delta Igarashi 05	Grand Hotel	Anaheim, California (United States)
1983	EFRA	1:8	Sport IC Track	(France) David Lecat	PB Alpha – Picco	Circuit Carnoux	Carnoux-en-Provence (France)
1984	EFRA	1:12	Electric Track Stock	(United States) Bud Bartos	Parma Euro Panther – Igarashi 05	Herning Kongrescenter	Herning, Denmark
1984	EFRA	1:12	Electric Track Modified	(United States) Tony Neisinger	Associated RC12i – Reedy	Herning Kongrescenter	Herning, Denmark
1985	FEMCA	1:8	Sport IC Track	(Netherlands) Rody Roem	Serpent Quattro – OPS	Tokyo Disneyland	Urayasu, Chiba (Japan)
1985	ROAR	1:10	Electric Off Road Stock (Note: Opened for both 2WD and 4WD cars.)	(United States) Jay Halsey	Associated RC10 – Reedy	Del Mar RC Raceway	Del Mar, California (United States)
1985	ROAR	1:10	Electric Off Road Unlimited	(United States) Gil Losi Jr	Yokomo Dog Fighter YZ-834B – Trinity	Del Mar RC Raceway	Del Mar, California (United States)
1986	EFRA	1:8	IC Off Road	(France) Frederic Veysseyre	Yankee 86 – Cipolla	Mini Circuit de Montbonnot	Grenoble (France)
1986	ROAR	1:12	Electric Track Modified	(United States) Tony Neisinger	Associated RC12L – Reedy	Tropicana Hotel	Las Vegas, Nevada (United States)
1987	ROAR	1:8	Sport IC Track	(United States) Pete Fusco	Associated RC500 – Novarossi	Ranch Pit Shop	Pomona, California (United States)
1987	EFRA	1:10	Electric Off Road 2WD	(United States) Joel Johnson	Kyosho Ultima – Trinity Monster Pure Gold	Romsey Off-Road Club	Romsey (England)
1987	EFRA	1:10	Electric Off Road 4WD	(Japan) Masami Hirosaka	Schumacher CAT XL – HPI UNO Blue Label	Romsey Off-Road Club	Romsey (England)
1988	EFRA	1:8	IC Off Road	(Italy) Maurizio Monesi	Garbo Roadfighter – Mantua T4		Mantua (Italy)
1988	EFRA	1:12	Electric Track Modified	(Japan) Masami Hirosaka	Associated RC12L – Reedy		Baarn (Netherlands)
1989	EFRA	1:8	Sport IC Track	(Italy) Lamberto Collari	BMT 891 – REX Collari	Model Auto Club Heemstede	Heemstede (Netherlands)
1989	FEMCA	1:10	Electric Off Road 2WD	(Japan) Masami Hirosaka	Associated RC10 – Reedy	St. Ives Showground	St Ives, New South Wales (Australia)
1989	FEMCA	1:10	Electric Off Road 4WD	(Japan) Masami Hirosaka	Yokomo Super Dog Fighter YZ-870C – Reedy	St. Ives Showground	St Ives, New South Wales (Australia)
1990	FEMCA	1:8	IC Off Road	(Japan) Koji Sanada	Mugen Super Sport – Novarossi		Bangkok (Thailand)
1990	FEMCA	1:12	Electric Track Modified	(United States) Chris Doseck	Associated RC12L – CAM	Ngee Ann Polytechnic	Singapore
1991	ROAR	1:8	Sport IC Track	(Italy) Lamberto Collari	BMT 891 – Nova Collari		Austin, Texas (United States)
1991	ROAR	1:10	Electric Off Road 2WD	(Japan) Masami Hirosaka	Associated RC10 – Reedy	Freedom Hill Park	Sterling Heights, Michigan (United States)
1991	ROAR	1:10	Electric Off Road 4WD	(United States) Cliff Lett	Yokomo YZ-10 Super Dog Fighter Works '91 – Reedy	Freedom Hill Park	Sterling Heights, Michigan (United States)
1992	EFRA	1:8	IC Off Road	(Japan) Kokushi Toge	Kyosho Inferno – OS RX		Usingen (Germany)
1992	ROAR	1:10	Electric Track PRO 10	(United States) Joel Johnson	Trinity EV-10 – Trinity	Ranch Pit Shop	Pomona, California (United States)
1992	ROAR	1:12	Electric Track Modified	(United States) Tony Neisinger	Associated RC12LW - Reedy		Grand Rapids, Michigan (United States)
1993	EFRA	1:8	Sport IC Track	(Italy) Lamberto Collari	BMT 933 – Nova Collari		Gothenburg (Sweden)
1993	EFRA	1:10	Electric Off Road 2WD	(United States) Brian Kinwald	Associated RC10 Worlds Car – Reedy	Pipps Hill Leisure Complex	Basildon (England)
1993	EFRA	1:10	Electric Off Road 4WD	(Japan) Masami Hirosaka	Yokomo Super Dog Fighter Works '93 – Reedy	Pipps Hill Leisure Complex	Basildon (England)
1994	EFRA	1:8	IC Off Road	(Italy) Maurizio Monesi	Kyosho Turbo Inferno – OPS		Kirchschlag in der Buckligen Welt (Austria)
1994	EFRA	1:10	Electric Track PRO 10	(Japan) Masami Hirosaka	Yokomo YRX-10 – Reedy	Tamiya Raceway Sonneberg	Sonneberg (Germany)
1994	EFRA	1:12	Electric Track Modified	(United Kingdom) David Spashett	Corally SP12G2		Paris (France)
1995	FEMCA	1:8	Sport IC Track	(Italy) Lamberto Collari	Serpent Excel – Nova Collari		Phuket (Thailand)
1995	FEMCA	1:10	Electric Off Road 2WD	(United States) Matt Francis	Associated RC10B2 – Reedy	Yatabe Arena	Tsukuba, Ibaraki (Japan)
1995	FEMCA	1:10	Electric Off Road 4WD	(United States) Mark Pavidis	Yokomo Super Dog Fighter YZ-10 – Reedy	Yatabe Arena	Tsukuba, Ibaraki (Japan)
1996	EFRA	1:8	IC Off Road	(Italy) Alex Laffranchi	Kyosho Inferno MP5 – Picco P6	National Motor Museum	Beaulieu, Hampshire (England)
1996	ROAR	1:10	Electric Track PRO 10	(United States) Mike Swauger	Associated RC10L2 – Reedy	Revelation Raceway	Montclair, California (United States)
1996	ROAR	1:12	Electric Track Modified	(Japan) Masami Hirosaka	Associated RC12LC – Reedy	Revelation Raceway	Montclair, California (United States)
1997	FAMAR	1:8	Sport IC Track	(Italy) Lamberto Collari	Serpent Vector – Novarossi Speed	Pegaso Raceway	Toluca (Mexico)
1997	ROAR	1:10	Electric Off Road 2WD	(United States) Brian Kinwald	Losi XX-CR – Trinity	Ranch Pit Shop	Pomona, California (United States)
1997	ROAR	1:10	Electric Off Road 4WD	(Japan) Masami Hirosaka	Yokomo Super Dog Fighter MX-4 – Reedy	Ranch Pit Shop	Pomona, California (United States)
1998	EFRA	1:8	IC Off Road	(Germany) Daniel Reckward	Kyosho Inferno MP6 – RB WS7	Mini Autódromo do Estádio Universitário de Coimbra	Coimbra (Portugal)
1998	EFRA	1:10	IC Track 235mm Class I Group C	(Germany) Michael Salven	Serpent Impact – Nova Mega	Auto Modelbouw Club Apeldoorn	Apeldoorn (Netherlands)
1998	EFRA	1:10	IC Track 235mm Class II Touring Cars	(Finland) Timmo Rinne	Serpent Impact – Nova Mega	Auto Modelbouw Club Apeldoorn	Apeldoorn (Netherlands)
1998	EFRA	1:10	Electric Track ISTC	(United Kingdom) David Spashett	Losi Street Weapon – Trinity	Temple Park Leisure Centre	South Shields, Newcastle upon Tyne (England)
1998	EFRA	1:10	Electric Track PRO 10	(United Kingdom) David Spashett	Trinity Switch Blade – Trinity	Temple Park Leisure Centre	South Shields, Newcastle upon Tyne (England)
1998	EFRA	1:12	Electric Track Modified	(United Kingdom) David Spashett	Trinity Switch Blade 12SJ – Trinity	Temple Park Leisure Centre	South Shields, Newcastle upon Tyne (England)
1999	EFRA	1:8	Sport IC Track	(France) Adrien Bertin	Mugen MRX2 – Nova JP	Mini Circuit Patrick Depailler	Clermont Ferrand (France)
1999	EFRA	1:10	Electric Off Road 2WD	(Japan) Masami Hirosaka	Associated RC10B3 – Reedy	Uimahalli	Rauma (Finland)
1999	EFRA	1:10	Electric Off Road 4WD	(Finland) Jukka Steenari	Losi XX-4 – Team Orion	Uimahalli	Rauma (Finland)
2000	ROAR	1:8	IC Off Road	(Japan) Yuichi Kanai	Kyosho Inferno MP7.5 – RB WS7	Silverton Hotel	Las Vegas, Nevada (United States)
2000	EFRA	1:10	IC Track 235mm Touring Cars	(Germany) Michael Salven	Serpent Impact M2 – Nova Mega	Stöhr-Ring	Kirchberg an der Raab (Austria)
2000	FEMCA	1:10	Electric Track PRO 10	(Japan) Masami Hirosaka	Yokomo YRX-2000 – Reedy	Yatabe Arena	Tsukuba, Ibaraki (Japan)
2000	FEMCA	1:10	Electric Touring Cars	(Japan) Atsushi Hara	Yokomo MR4-TC Pro – Reedy	Yatabe Arena	Tsukuba, Ibaraki (Japan)
2000	FEMCA	1:12	Electric Track Modified	(Japan) Masami Hirosaka	Associated RC12L3 – Reedy	Yatabe Arena	Tsukuba, Ibaraki (Japan)
2001	FEMCA	1:8	Sport IC Track	(Japan) Kenji Osaka	Mugen MRX-3 – Nova JP	John Grant International Raceway	Sydney (Australia)
2001	EFRA	1:5	IC Touring	(Germany) Marcel Strauch	FG Competition – Zenoah G230RC	Minidrom Ettlingen	Ettlingen (Germany)
2001	FAMAR	1:10 (Note: Because of the September 11 attacks which occurred prior to the championships, the event was delayed until 2002.)	Electric Off Road 2WD	(United States) Matt Francis	Losi XXX – Trinity	Tshwane Raceway And Promotions (TRAP)	Pretoria (South Africa)
2001	FAMAR	1:10	Electric Off Road 4WD	(Finland) Jukka Steenari	Losi XX-4 – Team Orion	Tshwane Raceway And Promotions (TRAP)	Pretoria (South Africa)
2002	FAMAR	1:8	IC Off Road	(United States) Greg Degani	Kyosho Inferno MP7.5 – OS RZ V01B	Green Mountain Raceway	Punta del Este (Uruguay)
2002	ROAR	1:10	IC Track 235mm Touring Cars	(United States) Brian Berry	Serpent Impact M2 – RB X12	Hamilton Ohio Scale Auto Raceway	Hamilton, Ohio (United States)
2002	ROAR	1:10	200mm Nitro Touring	(United States) Mark Pavidis	Associated Nitro TC3 – O’Donnell RB	Hamilton Ohio Scale Auto Raceway	Hamilton, Ohio (United States)
2002	FAMAR	1:10	Electric Track Touring	(Thailand) Surikarn Chaidejsuriya	Tamiya TRF414M – Reedy	Keywest Model Racers	Krugersdorp, Gauteng (South Africa)
2002	FAMAR	1:12	Electric Track Modified	(Japan) Masami Hirosaka	Yokomo 12LY	Keywest Model Racers	Krugersdorp, Gauteng (South Africa)
2003	ROAR	1:8	Sport IC Track	(Italy) Lamberto Collari	Kyosho Evolva 2005 WC – Sirio	Hamilton Ohio Scale Auto Raceway	Hamilton, Ohio (United States)
2003	ROAR	1:5	IC Touring	(Netherlands) Hessel Roskam	FG Competition Evo 2003	KZ Speedway	Sun Valley, Los Angeles, California (United States)
2003	ROAR	1:10	Electric Off Road 2WD	(United States) Billy Easton	Associated RC10B4 – Reedy	Minnreg RC Car Club	Largo, Florida (United States)
2003	ROAR	1:10	Electric Off Road 4WD	(United States) Ryan Cavalieri	Losi XXX-4 – Trinity	Minnreg RC Car Club	Largo, Florida (United States)
2004	EFRA	1:8	IC Off Road	(France) Guillaume Vray	Mugen MBX 5 – RB WS7II	Fururing Raceway	Furulund (Sweden)
2004	FAMAR	1:10	200mm Nitro Touring	(France) Adrien Bertin	Kyosho PureTen V-One RRR – Sirio	Jundiai Raceway	Jundiaí, São Paulo (Brazil)
2004	ROAR	1:10	Electric Touring	(Germany) Marc Rheinard	Tamiya TRF415 – Team Orion	Kissimmee R/C Raceway	Kissimmee, Florida (United States)
2004	ROAR	1:12	Electric Track Modified	(Japan) Masami Hirosaka	Associated RC12L4 – Reedy	Kissimmee R/C Raceway	Kissimmee, Florida (United States)
2005	EFRA	1:8	Sport IC Track	(Italy) Lamberto Collari	Kyosho Evolva – Sirio PR-Pro	Messina	Messina, Sicily (Italy)
2005	EFRA	1:5	IC Touring	(United Kingdom) Ian Oddie	H.A.R.M. SX-3 – Zenoah	Mini Racing Ticino e Moesa	Lostallo (Switzerland)
2005	EFRA	1:10	Electric Off Road 2WD	(England) Neil Cragg	Associated RC10B4 – Reedy	AF Model Rings	Collegno (Italy)
2005	EFRA	1:10	Electric Off Road 4WD	(United States) Ryan Cavalieri	JConcepts BJ4 – Trinity	AF Model Rings	Collegno (Italy)
2006	FEMCA	1:8	IC Off Road	(United States) Mark Pavidis	Kyosho Inferno MP777 WC – OS V-Spec	Ancol R/C Circuit, Ancol Dreamland	Jakarta (Indonesia)
2006	FEMCA	1:10	200mm Nitro Touring	(Japan) Keisuke Fukuda	Mugen MTX-4R – Mugen Ninja	New England Raceway	Brisbane (Australia)
2006	EFRA	1:10	Electric Touring	(England) Andy Moore	Hot Bodies Cyclone Hara Edition – Team Orion	AF Model Rings	Collegno (Italy)
2006	EFRA	1:12	Electric Track Modified	(United Kingdom) David Spashett	Corally SP12X "US Spec" – Peak Vantage 07	AF Model Rings	Collegno (Italy)
2007	FAMAR	1:8	Sport IC Track	(Italy) Lamberto Collari	Kyosho Evolva M3 – Novarossi	CARC (Club de Automodelismo Radiocontrolado de Córdoba)	Córdoba (Argentina)
2007	FEMCA	1:5	IC Touring	(Denmark) Martin Lissau	FG Competition EVO 04	England Park Raceway	Brisbane (Australia)
2007	FEMCA	1:10	Electric Off Road 2WD	(Japan) Hayato Matsuzaki	Associated RC10B4 – HPI	Hakusan Arena	Ishikawa (Japan)
2007	FEMCA	1:10	Electric Off Road 4WD	(United States) Jared Tebo	Associated RC10B44 – Reedy	Hakusan Arena	Ishikawa (Japan)
2008	ROAR	1:8	IC Off Road	(Japan) Atsushi Hara	Hot Bodies D8 – OS Speed Tuned 21VZ-B V-Spec	The Farm 2 R/C Raceway	Charlotte, North Carolina (United States)
2008	EFRA	1:10	200 mm IC On-road	(Italy) Daniele Ielasi	Kyosho PureTen V-ONE RRR Evo.2 – Picco P1-R EVO 3	Circuito Internacional de Monsanto	Lisbon (Portugal)
2008	FEMCA	1:10	Electric Touring	(Germany) Marc Rheinard	Tamiya TRF416 – Speed Passion	Radio Control Speedway	Bangkok (Thailand)
2008	FEMCA	1:12	Electric Track	(Japan) Naoto Matsukura	Associated 12R5	Radio Control Speedway	Bangkok (Thailand)
2009	EFRA	1:8	Sport IC Track	(Italy) Lamberto Collari	Kyosho Evolva M3 Evo	Mini Racing Ticino e Moesa	Lostallo (Switzerland)
2009	FAMAR	1:5	IC Touring	(South Africa) Barend Myburgh	H.A.R.M. SX-3	Tshwane Raceway And Promotions (TRAP)	Pretoria (South Africa)
2009	FAMAR	1:10	Electric Off Road 2WD	(Germany) Martin Achter	Associated RC10B4* – CS Electronic	Tshwane Raceway And Promotions (TRAP)	Pretoria (South Africa)
2009	FAMAR	1:10	Electric Off Road 4WD	(Germany) Martin Achter	Team Durango DEX410 – CS Magnetic Delta	Tshwane Raceway And Promotions (TRAP)	Pretoria (South Africa)
2010	FEMCA	1:8	IC Off Road	(United States) Cody King	Kyosho Inferno MP9 TKI2 – Team Orion Alpha ABI	Pattaya RC Powerboat Track	Pattaya (Thailand)
2010	ROAR	1:10	200 mm IC On-road	(United States) Ralph Burch	Xray NT1 – Max Power XXL3	Gulf Coast Raceway	Houston, Texas (United States)
2010	EFRA	1:10	Electric Touring	(Germany) Marc Rheinard	Tamiya TRF416X – Speed Passion	MAC Burgdorf	Burgdorf, Hanover (Germany)
2010	EFRA	1:12	Electric Track	(Japan) Naoto Matsukura	Yokomo R12 – NOSRAM	Mehrzweckhalle Gymnasium	Burgdorf, Hanover (Germany)
2011	ROAR	1:8	Sport IC Track	(Germany) Robert Pietsch	Mugen MRX-5 – Novarossi	Homestead RC Raceway	Homestead, Florida (United States)
2011	EFRA	1:5	IC Touring	(France) Guillaume Solon	Contrast Neox GS–Abbate	Complexe d'Hanvec	Brest (France)
2011	EFRA	1:10	Electric Off Road 2WD	(United States) Ryan Cavalieri	Team Associated RC10B4.1 – Team Orion	Pitkamaki Race-Center	Vaasa (Finland)
2011	EFRA	1:10	Electric Off Road 4WD	(United States) Ryan Cavalieri	Team Associated RC10B44.1 – Team Orion	Pitkamaki Race-Center	Vaasa (Finland)
2012	FAMAR	1:8	IC Off Road	(Spain) Robert Batlle	Mugen MBX-7 – Novarossi	Speed Paradise	Buenos Aires (Argentina)
2012	FEMCA	1:10	200 mm IC On-road	(Thailand) Meen Vejrak	KM H-K1 – Novarossi	RC Addict	Bangkok (Thailand)
2012	EFRA	1:10	Electric Touring	(Netherlands) Jilles Groskamp	Tamiya TRF417 – Team Orion	Model Auto Club Heemstede	Heemstede (Netherlands)
2012	EFRA	1:12	Electric Track	(Japan) Naoto Matsukura	Yokomo R12 – Yokomo	Kennemer Sportcenter	Heemstede (Netherlands)
2013	FEMCA	1:8	Sport IC Track	(Japan) Tadahiko Sahashi	Serpent 977 Viper – Picco	Kei Tune Racing Speedway	Chiba, Tokyo (Japan)
2013	EFRA	1:5	IC Touring	(Germany) Markus Feldmann	Mecatech FW 01–Abbate	Mini Racing Ticino e Moesa	Lostallo (Switzerland)
2013	ROAR	1:10	Electric Off Road 2WD	(United States) Jared Tebo	Kyosho Ultima RB6 – Team Orion	Silver Dollar R/C Raceway	Chico, California (United States)
2013	ROAR	1:10	Electric Off Road 4WD	(United States) Steven Hartson	Team Associated RC10B44.2 – LRP	Silver Dollar R/C Raceway	Chico, California (United States)
2014	EFRA	1:8	IC Off Road	(Canada) Ty Tessmann	Hot Bodies D812 – OS Speed B2101	Naxos World Track	Sicily (Italy)
2014	FEMCA	1:10	200 mm IC On-road	(Sweden) Alexander Hagberg	Xray NT1 – Orcan RS	Huge RC Project	Bangkok (Thailand)
2014	ROAR	1:10	Electric Touring	(Japan) Naoto Matsukura	Yokomo BD7-15 – Yokomo	Full Throttle Raceway	Kissimmee, Florida (United States)
2014	ROAR	1:12	Electric Track	(Germany) Marc Rheinard	CRC Altered Ego Xti – Muchmore	Minnreg Hall	Largo, Florida (United States)
2015	FAMAR	1:8	Sport IC Track	(Switzerland) Simon Kurzbuch	Shepherd Velox V8 EC – Novarossi	Miniautodromo Zeca Elias	Americana City (Brazil)
2015	FEMCA	1:8	GT	(Malaysia) Lim Kai Liang	Mugen MGT7 – S-Power S7 EVO	KLIRCC Kepong	Kuala Lumpur (Malaysia)
2015	FEMCA	1:5	IC Touring	(Australia) Russell Grenenger	H.A.R.M. – Abbate	KLIRCC Kepong	Kuala Lumpur (Malaysia)
2015	FEMCA	1:10	Electric Off Road 2WD	(United States) Spencer Rivkin	Team Associated RC10B5M – Reedy	Yatabe Arena	Tsukuba, Ibaraki (Japan)
2015	FEMCA	1:10	Electric Off Road 4WD	(Portugal) Bruno Coelho	Xray XB4 '16 – LRP	Yatabe Arena	Tsukuba, Ibaraki (Japan)
2016	ROAR	1:8	IC Off Road	(Sweden) David Ronnefalk	HB Racing D815 V2 – Team Orion	RC Tracks of Las Vegas	Las Vegas, Nevada (United States)
2016	EFRA	1:10	200 mm IC On-road	(Germany) Dominic Greiner	Serpent 748 Natrix – Novarossi	Miniautodromo Internazionale M.Rosati	Gubbio (Italy)
2016	FEMCA	1:10	Electric Touring	(Germany) Ronald Volker	Yokomo BD8 – LRP	Fengtai Sports Center	Beijing (China)
2016	FEMCA	1:12	Electric Track	(Japan) Naoto Matsukura	Roche Prototype – Muchmore	Fengtai Sports Center	Beijing (China)
2017	EFRA	1:8	Sport IC Track	(Italy) Dario Balestri	INFINITY – Max Power RP9.S	RC Circuit Jean Nougier	Monteux (France)
2017	FAMAR	1:5	IC Touring	(Argentina) Santiago Meirinhos	RS5–Abbate	Enzo Bransiforte	Buenos Aires (Argentina)
2017	FEMCA	1:10	Electric Off Road 2WD	(United States) Ryan Maifield	Yokomo YZ-2 DTM – Team Orion	ARC International Raceway	Xiamen (China)
2017	FEMCA	1:10	Electric Off Road 4WD	(United States) Ryan Maifield	Yokomo YZ-4 SF – Team Orion	ARC International Raceway	Xiamen (China)
2018	FEMCA	1:8	IC Off Road	(Italy) Davide Ongaro	Associated RC8B3.1 – LRP	MORBC, Whiteman Park	Perth (Australia)
2018	ROAR	1:10	200 mm IC On-road	(Japan) Naoto Matsukura	INFINITY IF15 – OS Speed	Homestead RC Raceway	Miami, Florida (United States)
2018	FAMAR	1:10	Electric Touring	(Portugal) Bruno Coelho	Xray T4 '19 – Hobbywing	Welkom RC Arena	Welkom (South Africa)
2018	FAMAR	1:12	Electric Track	(Sweden) Alexander Hagberg	Xray X12 '19 – Hobbywing	Welkom RC Arena	Welkom (South Africa)
2019	ROAR	1:8	IC Track	(Japan) Shoki Takahata	Mugen MRX6–OS Speed	Steel City RC Speedway	Fontana, California (United States)
2019	EFRA	1:5	IC Touring	(Croatia) Marko Grigić	Mecatech FW01 – Abbate	Associação de Modelismo de Vila Real	Vila Real (Portugal)
2019	EFRA	1:10	Electric Off Road 2WD	(United States) Spencer Rivkin	Team Associated B6.1DL – Hobbywing	Hudy Arena	Trenčín (Slovakia)
2019	EFRA	1:10	Electric Off Road 4WD	(Portugal) Bruno Coelho	Xray XB4 '19 – Hobbywing	Hudy Arena	Trenčín (Slovakia)
2020	ROAR	1:8	IC GT	(Germany) Jörn Neumann	Sworkz S35-GT – Team Orion	Homestead RC Raceway	Miami, Florida (United States)
2020	EFRA	1:12	Electric Track, Modified	(Germany) Marc Rheinard	Schumacher Eclipse 3 – Muchmore	Centre:MK	Milton Keynes (United Kingdom)
2020	EFRA	1:12	Electric Track, Stock	(United Kingdom) Andy Murray	Schumacher Eclipse 3 – Trinity	Centre:MK	Milton Keynes (United Kingdom)
2022	EFRA	1:8	IC Off-Road (Note: Because of the COVID-19 pandemic which occurred prior to the championships, the event is postponed. See also Impact of the COVID-19 pandemic on sports.)	(Italy) Davide Ongaro	Team Associated RC8B3.2	Circuit RC Redovan	Redovan (Spain)
2022	ROAR	1:5	IC Touring	(Germany) Markus Feldmann	Mecatech FW 01–Abbate	Steel City RC Speedway	Fontana, California (United States)
2022	EFRA	1:10	Electric Touring	(Portugal) Bruno Coelho	Xray X4 '22	Miniautodromo Internazionale M.Rosati	Gubbio (Italy)
2022	FEMCA	1:10	200 mm IC On-road	(Japan) Tadahiko Sahashi	INFINITY IF18-II - OS Speed	RC Addict Track	Bangkok (Thailand)
2023	ROAR	1:10	Electric Off Road 2WD	(United States) Michael "Tater" Sontag	Losi 22 5.0 DC Elite - Hobbywing	Hobby Action RC Raceway	Chandler, Arizona (United States)
2023	ROAR	1:10	Electric Off Road 4WD	(Italy) Davide Ongaro	Team Associated B74.2d - Hobbywing	Hobby Action RC Raceway	Chandler, Arizona (United States)
2023	FEMCA	1:8	IC Track	(Italy) Dario Balestri	INFINITY IF18-III - Max Power	INFINITY International RC Speedway [IFS]	Inabe, Mie (Japan)
2023	FEMCA	1:8	IC GT	(Germany) Toni Gruber	HongNor X3GTS	John Grant International Raceway	Sydney (Australia)
2023	ROAR	1:12	Electric Track, Modified	(Poland) Michal Orlowski	Schumacher Eclipse 4 - Hobbywing	Beachline Raceway	Cocoa, Florida (United States)
2023	ROAR	1:12	Electric Track, Stock	(Germany) Max Mächler	Awesomatix A12 - Hobbywing	Beachline Raceway	Cocoa, Florida (United States)
2024	EFRA	1:8	IC Off-Road	(Italy) Davide Ongaro	Team Associated RC8B4.1 - OS Speed	Circuit RC Redovan	Redovan (Spain)
2024	ROAR	1:10	Electric Touring, Mod	(Portugal) Bruno Coelho	Xray X4 '25 - Hobbywing	Finishline Raceway	Bakersfield, California (United States)
2024	ROAR	1:10	Electric Touring, Spec	(Germany) Simon Lauter	Awesomatix A800R - Hobbywing	Finishline Raceway	Bakersfield, California (United States)
2024	FEMCA	1:10	200mm IC On-road	(Netherlands) Jilles Groskamp	INFINITY IF15-II	Huge RC	Bangkok (Thailand)
2025	EFRA	1:8	Electric Off Road	(Denmark) Marcus Kaerup	Team Associated RC8B4.1e - Hobbywing	Barcelos Buggy Arena	Barcelos, Portugal
2025		1:8	GT	Alessio Mazzeo (ITA)	Raptor Nitro	Club de Aeromodelos de Chile	Santiago (Chile)
2025		1:8	GTe	Alessio Mazzeo (ITA)	Raptor Electric	Club de Aeromodelos de Chile	Santiago (Chile)
2025	FAMAR	1:10	Electric Off Road 2WD	(United States) Broc Champlin	Schumacher Cougar LD3D - Hobbywing	Hills Offroad RC	Sydney (Australia)
2025	FAMAR	1:10	Electric Off Road 4WD	(Denmark) Marcus Kaerup	Team Associated RC10B84d - Hobbywing	Hills Offroad RC	Sydney (Australia)
2025		1:8	IC Track	(Japan) Shoki Takahata	Mugen Seiki MRX7	Club de Aeromodelos de Chile	(Chile)
2026	~~FEMCA~~	~~1:12~~	~~ISTC~~	~~Cancelled~~			~~Guangzhou Foshan China~~
2026	EFRA	1:5	IC Touring	(France) Arthur Simon		Mini Racing Ticino e Moesa	Lostallo Switzerland
2026	EFRA	1:10	200mm IC On-Road	(Japan) Naoto Matsukura	INFINITY IF15-2 - Ielasi tuned	Miniautodromo Internazionale Mario Rosati	Gubbio Italy
2026	ROAR	1/8	IC Offroad	(Sweden) David Ronnefalk	XRay XB4'26	Thornhill Racing Circuit	Thornhill, Texas United States
2026	FEMCA	1:10	ISTC - Electric On-Road	(Germany) Marc Rheinard	Xray X4`27 - CAYOTE	Huge RC	Bangkok (Thailand)

== Statistics ==
NB: Excludes World Cup winners

Updated as of 22/5/2025

=== Most Wins ===
==== Drivers ====
Rank	Driver	Wins	1:5 IC TC	1:8 IC Tr	1:8 IC GT	1:8 IC OR	1:8 EP OR	1:10 IC TC	1:10 IC Tr	1:10 EP TC	1:10 EP Tr	1:10 EP OR2	1:10 EP OR4	1:12 EP Tr	1:12 EP Tr S
1	(Japan) Masami Hirosaka	14									2	3	4	5	
2	(Italy) Lamberto Collari	9		9											
3	(Japan) Naoto Matsukura	7						2		1				4	
4	(Germany) Marc Rheinard	6								4				2	
5	(Portugal) Bruno Coelho	5								3			2		
6	(United Kingdom) David Spashett	4									1			3	
6	(United States) Ryan Cavalieri	4										1	3		
6	(Italy) Davide Ongaro	4				3							1		
9	(United States) Tony Neisinger	3												3	
9	(United States) Mark Pavidis	3		1		1							1		
11	(United States) Arturo Carbonell	2		1										1	
11	(Italy) Maurizio Monesi	2				2									
11	(United States) Joel Johnson	2									1	1			
11	(United States) Brian Kinwald	2										2			
11	(United States) Matt Francis	2										2			
11	(Finland) Jukka Steenari	2											2		
11	(France) Adrien Bertin	2		1				1							
11	(Japan) Atsushi Hara	2				1				1					
11	(Germany) Martin Achter	2										1	1		
11	(United States) Jared Tebo	2										1	1		
11	(United States) Ryan Maifield	2										1	1		
11	(Sweden) Alexander Hagberg	2						1						1	
11	(United States) Spencer Rivkin	2										2			
11	(Japan) Tadahiko Sahashi	2		1				1							
11	(Italy) Dario Balestri	2		2											
11	(Denmark) Marcus Kaerup	2					1						1		
11	(Netherlands) Jilles Groskamp	2						1		1					
11	(Sweden) David Ronnefalk					2									

==== Car manufacturers ====
Rank	Driver	Wins	1:5 IC TC	1:8 IC Tr	1:8 IC GT	1:8 IC OR	1:8 EP OR	1:10 IC TC	1:10 IC Tr	1:10 EP TC	1:10 EP Tr	1:10 EP OR2	1:10 EP OR4	1:12 EP Tr M	1:12 EP Tr S
1	(United States) Team Associated	35		2		3	1				1	13	5	10	
2	(Japan) Yokomo	17								3	2	1	7	4	
3	(Japan) Kyosho	16		4		8		2				2			
4	(Slovakia) XRAY	10				1		2		2			4	1	
5	(Netherlands) Serpent	9		4				1	4						
6	(Japan) Mugen Seiki	8		4		3		1							
7	(United States) TLR	6										3	3		
7	(Japan) INFINITY	6		2				4							
8	(Japan) Tamiya	5								5					
8	(United Kingdom) Schumacher	5										1	1	2	1
11	(Switzerland) HB Racing (Note: Up to 2016, operated as Hot Bodies.)	4				3				1					
12	(Italy) Blitz Model Technica	3		3											
12	(United States) Team Trinity	3									2			1	
12	(Germany) FG Modellsport	3	3												
12	(Germany) H.A.R.M. Racing	3	3												
12	(Italy) Mecatech	3	3												
17	(United Kingdom) PB Racing	2		2											
17	(United States) Delta Systems	2		1											1
17	(Netherlands) Corally	2												2	

==== IC Engines ====
Rank	Driver	Wins	1:8 IC Tr	1:8 IC GT	1:8 IC OR	1:10 IC TC	1:10 IC Tr
1	(Italy) Novarossi	16	12		2	2	
2	(Japan) O.S. Engines	11	1		7	3	
3	(Italy) Picco	4	3			1	
3	(France) RB Products	4	3				1
5	(Italy) OPS	3	2		1		
5	(Italy) Sirio	3	2			1	
5	(Switzerland) Team Orion	3		1	2		

==== Electric Motors ====
Rank	Driver	Wins	1:8 EP OR	1:10 EP Tr	1:10 EP TC	1:10 EP OR2	1:10 EP OR4	1:12 EP Tr	1:12 EP Tr S
1	(United States) Reedy	28		3	2	8	5	10	
2	(China) HobbyWing	14	1		4	3	3	2	1
3	(Switzerland) Team Orion	10			3	3	4		
4	(United States) Team Trinity	10		2		3	3	1	1
5	(Germany) LRP Electronic	3			1		2		
5	(South Korea) Muchmore Racing	3						3	
6	(United States) Team Checkpoint	2				1	1		
6	(Germany) CS Electronic	2				1	1		
6	(Germany) Nosram	2						2	
6	(Hong Kong) Speed Passion	2			2				
6	(Japan) Yokomo	2			1			1	

==== By Member Blocs (Drivers) ====
Rank	Driver	Wins	1:5 IC TC	1:8 IC Tr	1:8 IC GT	1:8 IC OR	1:8 EP OR	1:10 IC TC	1:10 IC Tr	1:10 EP TC	1:10 EP Tr	1:10 EP OR2	1:10 EP OR4	1:12 EP Tr	1:12 EP Tr S
1	EFRA	69	6	17	2	10	1	2	3	7	1	2	6	6	2
2	ROAR	41		3		4		1	1		2	14	9	5	2
3	FEMCA	35	1	3		4		5		3	2	4	4	7	
4	FAMAR	2	2												

==== Win(s) by Nations (Drivers) ====
Rank	Driver	Wins	1:5 IC TC	1:8 IC Tr	1:8 IC GT	1:8 IC OR	1:8 EP OR	1:10 IC TC	1:10 IC Tr	1:10 EP TC	1:10 EP Tr	1:10 EP OR2	1:10 EP OR4	1:12 EP Tr	1:12 EP Tr S
1	United States	41		3		3		1	1		2	14	9	6	2
2	Japan	32		3		4		4		2	2	4	4	9	
3	Italy	18		11		5		1					1		
4	Germany	17	3	1	2	1		1	1	4		1	1	2	1
5	United Kingdom	8	1							1	1	1		3	1
6	France	6	1	2		2		1							
7	Portugal	4								2			2		
8	Netherlands	3	1	1						1					
8	Sweden	3				1		1						1	
8	Denmark	3	1				1						1		
11	Finland	2											2		
11	Thailand	2						1		1					

=== Most Wins in a single season ===
==== Drivers ====
Rank	Driver	Total	Year	Class
1	(United Kingdom) David Spashett	3	1998	1:10 Electric Track Touring; 1:10 Electric Track PRO 10; 1:12 Electric Track
2	(Japan) Masami Hirosaka	2	1989	1:10 Electric Off Road 2WD; 1:10 Electric Off Road 4WD
2	(Japan) Masami Hirosaka	2	2000	1:10 Electric Track PRO 10; 1:12 Electric Track
2	(Germany) Martin Achter	2	2009	1:10 Electric Off Road 2WD; 1:10 Electric Off Road 4WD
2	(United States) Ryan Cavalieri	2	2011	1:10 Electric Off Road 2WD; 1:10 Electric Off Road 4WD
2	(United States) Ryan Maifield	2	2017	1:10 Electric Off Road 2WD; 1:10 Electric Off Road 4WD
2	(Denmark) Marcus Kaerup	2	2025	1:8 Electric Off Road 1:10 Electric Off Road 4WD

=== Consecutive Wins ===
==== Drivers ====
Rank	Driver	Total	Year	Class
1	(Italy) Lamberto Collari	5	1989-1997	1:8 IC Track
2	(Italy) Lamberto Collari	4	2003-2009	1:8 IC Track
3	(Japan) Masami Hirosaka	3	2000-2004	1:12 Electric Track
3	(Japan) Naoto Matsukura	3	2008-2012	1:12 Electric Track

==== Car manufacturers ====
Rank	Brand	Wins	Years	Class
1	(United States) Team Associated	6	1982-1992	1:12 IC Track
1	(Japan) Kyosho	6	1992-2002	1:8 IC Off Road
3	(Japan) Yokomo	5	1989-1997	1:10 Electric Off Road 4WD
3	(United States) Team Associated	5	2003-2011	1:10 Electric Off Road 2WD
3	(Japan) Kyosho	5	2003-2009	1:8 IC Track
6	(United States) Team Associated	4	1989-1995	1:10 Electric Off Road 2WD
7	(Italy) Blitz Model Technica	3	1989-1993	1:8 IC Track
7	(Netherlands) Serpent	3	1998-2002	1:10 IC Track Touring
7	(United States) Team Losi	3	1999-2003	1:10 Electric Off Road 4WD
7	(Japan) Tamiya	3	2008-2012	1:10 Electric Touring
7	(United States) Team Associated			

=== Most Top Qualifiers (TQ) ===
Rank	Driver	Wins	1:5 IC TC	1:8 IC Tr	1:8 IC GT	1:8 IC OR	1:8 IC GT	1:8 EP OR	1:10 IC TC	1:10 IC Tr	1:10 EP TC	1:10 EP Tr	1:10 EP OR2	1:10 EP OR4	1:12 EP Tr	1:12 EP Tr S
1	(Japan) Masami Hirosaka	18									1	2	4	5	6	
2	(Japan) Naoto Matsukura	6							1		1				4	
3	(United States) Jared Tebo	5				2							2	1		
4	(Germany) Michael Salven	4		2						2						
4	(United Kingdom) David Spashett	4													4	
4	(Italy) Dario Balestri	4		2					2							
4	(Portugal) Bruno Coelho	4									2			2		
8	(United States) Gil Losi Jr.	3		1									1	1		
8	(United States) Matt Francis	3											2	1		
8	(United States) Mark Pavidis	3				2							1			
8	(Germany) Robert Pietsch	3		2					1							
8	(Germany) Marc Rheinard	3									2				1	
8	(United States) Ryan Maifield	3				1							1	1		
8	(Denmark) Marcus Kaerup	3						1					1	1		
8	(Sweden) Alexander Hagberg	3							1						2	
16	(United States) Ralph Burch Jr.	2		2												
16	(Italy) Lamberto Collari	2		2												
16	(Germany) Daniel Reckward	2				2										
16	(United States) Brian Kinwald	2												2		
16	(Germany) Martin Achter	2											1	1		
16	(United States) Ryan Cavalieri	2				1							1			
16	(Japan) Atsushi Hara	2									2					
16	(France) Bernard-Alain Arnaldi	2	2													
16	(United States) Spencer Rivkin	2											2			
16	(Germany) Markus Feldmann	2	2													

=== Most Finals appearances ===
==== A-main/finals appearances ====
Drivers with at least 10 finals appearances are listed

Italics: drivers who have not or yet to have won a Worlds title.

Bold: drivers who have actively appeared in a final race within the two previous Worlds

Craig Drescher has the most appearances for a driver who have yet to win a title as of 2026. Despite his last A-main appearance being in 2005, he inherited the title after Ralph Burch Jr. finally won his first title in 2010 having tried since 1981 at the age of 13. Ryan Maifield claimed the honor from Drescher in 2013, who held it until he win his off-road double in 2017.

Rank	Driver	App	1:5 IC TC	1:8 IC Tr	1:8 IC GT	1:8 IC OR	1:10 IC TC	1:10 IC Tr	1:10 EP TC	1:10 EP Tr	1:10 EP OR2	1:10 EP OR4	1:12 EP Tr	1:12 EP Tr S
1	(Japan) Masami Hirosaka	35							5	4	9	8	9	
2	(United States) **Ryan Maifield**	23				8					8	7		
3	(Japan) **Naoto Matsukura**	22		2		1	2		3		3	5	5	
4	(United States) Mark Pavidis	19				5			1		8	5		
4	(Netherlands) **Jilles Groskamp**	19		2			5		6				6	
4	(United States) **Ryan Cavalieri**	19				5					8	6		
6	(Japan) Atsushi Hara	18		2		3	1		6	1	1	2	2	
7	(Germany) **Marc Rheinard**	17					1		8				8	
8	(United States) Joel Johnson	16								3	3	3	7	
8	(United States) Ralph Burch Jr.	16		9			1	1		1			2	2
10	(United States) **Jared Tebo**	15				5					6	4		
12	(Italy) Lamberto Collari	13	2	11										
12	**(United Kingdom) Andy Moore**	13					2		5	1			5	
14	(United Kingdom) David Spashett	12					1		2	3			6	
14	(United States) Billy Easton	12				1			3		4	4		
14	(United Kingdom) Craig Drescher	12							2	2	4	3	2	
17	(Japan) **Hideo Kitazawa**	11							1	1			9	
17	(Japan) **Takaaki Shimo**	11		7			4							
19	(France) Adrien Bertin	10		7			3							

==== Podium finishers ====
Drivers with at least 5 podium finishes are listed

Italics: drivers who have not or yet to have won a Worlds title.

Bold: drivers who have actively appeared in a final race within the two previous Worlds

Takaaki Shimo has the most podium finishes for a driver who have yet to win a title as of 2026, having inherited the honor from Ryan Maifield in 2017.

Rank	Driver	App	1:5 IC TC	1:8 IC Tr	1:8 IC OR	1:10 IC TC	1:10 IC Tr	1:10 EP TC	1:10 EP Tr	1:10 EP OR2	1:10 EP OR4	1:12 EP Tr	1:12 EP Tr S
1	(Japan) Masami Hirosaka	25						3	2	5	6	9	
2	(Italy) Lamberto Collari	10	1	9									
2	(Japan) Atsushi Hara	10		1	3	1		4				1	
2	(United States) **Ryan Cavalieri**	10			1					4	5		
2	(Japan) **Naoto Matsukura**	10				2		1			2	5	
6	(United States) **Ryan Maifield**	9			1					5	3		
6	(Germany) **Marc Rheinard**	9				1		3				5	
8	(United States) Brian Kinwald	8			1					5	3		
9	(United States) Tony Neisinger	7		1					1	1		5	
9	(United Kingdom) David Spashett	7							2			5	
9	(United States) **Jared Tebo**	7			1					4	2		
11	(United States) Joel Johnson	6							2	2		2	
11	(Germany) **Ronald Völker**	6						5				1	
11	(Japan) **Takaaki Shimo**	6		4		2							
11	(Portugal) **Bruno Coelho**	6						4			2		
14	(Canada) **Ty Tessmann**	5			4						1		
