= IFMAR 1:8 IC Track World Championship =

International radio-controlled car racing championship

The IFMAR World Championship for 1:8 IC Track Cars (officially the IFMAR 1:8 IC Track World Championship), commonly known as the IC Track Worlds, is an international radio-controlled car racing competition sanctioned by the International Federation of Model Auto Racing (IFMAR). The championship has been held biennially in odd numbered years since 1977.

The event is contested using 1:8 scale on-road cars powered by internal combustion (IC) engines running on a nitromethanol fuel mixture.

== History ==
The inaugural 1:8 IC Track World Championship was held in 1977. Early editions were primarily dominated by American & British manufacturers, reflecting the origins of competitive radio-controlled car racing.

During the late 1980s and 1990s, European drivers and manufacturers became increasingly competitive. Italian driver Lamberto Collari emerged as a dominant figure in the category, winning multiple world titles between 1989 and 2009.

From the 2000s onwards, Japanese and European manufacturers such as Mugen Seiki, Kyosho, and Serpent have been prominent, contributing to ongoing advancements in chassis design, aerodynamics, and engine performance.

== Technical regulations ==
Cars competing in the championship must comply with IFMAR technical regulations for the 1:8 IC Track class.

Key specifications include:

- Scale: 1:8
- Drivetrain: Four-wheel drive (4WD)
- Engine: Internal combustion (.21 class)
- Fuel: Nitromethanol-based fuel mixture
- Tyres: Foam tyres for high-grip asphalt surfaces
- Bodyshell: Aerodynamic LMP-style bodies (Approved design)
- Race format: Qualifying rounds followed by a main final

== Venues ==
Edition			Venue				Competitors			Ref.
No.	Date	Year	Circuit	Location	Country	Bloc	No.	Nations	Bloc	Ref.
1		1977	Thorp Raceway	Pomona, California	United States	ROAR				
N/A		1978			Monaco	EFRA				
2		1979	Circuit Micro-Racing	Geneva	Switzerland	EFRA	148	18		
3		1981	Castleton Square	Indianapolis, Indiana	United States	ROAR				
4		1983	Circuit Carnoux	Carnoux-en-Provence	France	EFRA				
5		1985	Tokyo Disneyland	Urayasu, Chiba	Japan	FEMCA				
6		1987	Ranch Pit Shop	Pomona, California	United States	ROAR				
7		1989	Model Auto Club Heemstede	Heemstede	Netherlands	EFRA				
8		1991		Austin, Texas	United States	ROAR				
9		1993	Vast-8 Track	Gothenburg	Sweden	EFRA				
10		1995		Phuket	Thailand	FEMCA				
11		1997	Pegaso Raceway	Toluca	Mexico	FAMAR				
12		1999	Mini Circuit Patrick Depailler	Clermont Ferrand	France	EFRA	150	30	4	
13	9	2001	John Grant International Raceway	Sydney	Australia	FEMCA				
14	6	2003	Hamilton Ohio Scale Auto Raceway	Hamilton, Ohio	United States	ROAR				
15	9	2005	Messina	Messina, Sicily	Italy	EFRA				
16	3	2007	CARC (Club de Automodelismo Radiocontrolado de Córdoba)	Córdoba	ARG	FAMAR				
17	8	2009	Mini Racing Ticino e Moesa	Lostallo	Switzerland	EFRA				
18		2011	Homestead RC Raceway	Homestead, Florida	United States	ROAR	122	28	4	
19	10	2013	Kei Tune Racing Speedway	Chiba, Tokyo	Japan	FEMCA				
20	11	2015	Miniautodromo Zeca Elias	Americana City	Brazil	FAMAR				
21	9	2017	RC Circuit Jean Nougier	Monteux	France	EFRA	149	30	4	
22	10	2019	Steel City RC Speedway	Fontana, California	United States	ROAR				
23	10	2023	INFINITY International RC Speedway		Japan	FEMCA				
25	11	2025	Club de Aeromodelos de Chile	Santiago	Chile	FAMAR	48	16	4	

== World Champions Driver and Manufacturers ==
Some parts of the car are supplied by the event origanisers. These are typically the fuel to reduce shipping and rule compliance issues and the tyres to make the competition more equal. These parts are marked in italics.

Year	Driver	Chassis		Bodyshell		Engine			Electronics				Tyres		Ref.
Year	Driver	Brand	Model	Brand	Model	Brand	Model	Fuel	Transmitter	Model	Servo	Model	Brand	Type	Ref.
1977	Butch Kroells (USA)	Associated	RC100		30 KL	K & B			Futaba						
1979	Phil Booth (GBR)	PB International	V9			OPS			Futaba						
1981	Arturo Carbonell (USA)	Delta	Super J			Picco									
1983	Ermes Tadiello (ITA)	SG	Columbia			Picco									
1985	Rody Roem (NED)	Serpent	Quattro			OPS									
1987	Ralph Burch (USA)	Associated	RC500			Novarossi									
1989	Lamberto Collari (ITA)	BMT	891			Rex Collari									
1991	Lamberto Collari (ITA)	BMT	891			Top									
1993	Lamberto Collari (ITA)	BMT	933			Novarossi									
1995	Lamberto Collari (ITA)	Serpent	Excel												
1997	Lamberto Collari (ITA)	Serpent	Victor												
1999	Adrien Bertin (FRA)	Mugen	MRX-2	Mugen	Lola	JP Racing		Tornado							
2001	Kenji Osaka (JPN)	Mugen	MRX-3			Novarossi JP	RX21 RACE								
2003	Lamberto Collari (ITA)	Kyosho	Evolva												
2005	Lamberto Collari (ITA)	Kyosho	Evolva												
2007	Lamberto Collari (ITA)	Kyosho	Evolva M3												
2009	Lamberto Collari (ITA)	Mugen	MRX-5			Flash	21PTS					Contact			
2011	Robert Pietsch (GER)	Mugen	MRX-5			Flash	21PTS						Contact	Contact	
2013	Tadahiko Sahashi (JPN)	Serpent	977 Viper	Protoform	R18	Picco	Boost		Sanwa				Zac Project		
2015	Simon Kurzbuch (SUI)	Shepherd	Velox V8 EC	Protoform	PFR18	Nova									
2017	Dario Balestri (ITA)	Infinity		Protoform		Max Power									
2019	Shoki Takahata (JPN)	Mugen	MRX6 Prototype	Xtreme	Super Diablo	OS	Speed R2014	VP Racing	Sanwa	M17	Sanwa				
2023	Dario Balestri (ITA)	Infinity	IF18 III	Xtreme	Hyper Diablo	Max Power	Quadrifoglio RP9's		Sanwa		Savox				
2025	Shoki Takahata (JPN)	Mugen Seiki	MRX-7	Xtreme	Hyper Diablo	Max Power	351R		Sanwa	M17S	Sanwa	PGS-XR II			

== See also ==
- IFMAR World Championships
- IFMAR 1:8 IC Off-Road World Championship
- IFMAR 1:8 Electric Off-Road World Championship
