= 2007 IFMAR 1:10 Electric Off-Road World Championships =

Event Information
- Event Title: 2007 IFMAR 1:10 Electric Off-Road World Championships
- Dates run: 2007

Club Information
- Club Name: Hakusan Ichirino RC Club
- Venue: Hakusan Arena
- Location: Hakusan,
- Host country: Japan
- Surface: Clay Soil

Vehicle Specification
- Class: 1:10 Electric Offroad Buggy

2wd Title
- First: Hayato Matsuzaki (JPN); Associated RC10B4

4WD Title
- First: Jared Tebo (USA); Associated; B44

The 2007 IFMAR 1:10 Electric Off-Road World Championship (2007年IFMAR EP オフロード世界選手権) was the 12th edition of the biennial IFMAR 1:10 Electric Off-Road World Championship for 1:10 scale radio-controlled electric off-road buggies sanctioned by the International Federation of Model Auto Racing (IFMAR) to be run over two classes (2WD and 4WD) over seven days between 9 and 16 September 2007. Each class ran for three days.

The national sanctional body, Japan Model Racing Car Association (JMRCA), acted as the host nation on behalf of Far East Model Car Association (FEMCA). Hakusan Ichirino RC Club acted as the host club for the championship taking place at the Hakusan Arena in Hakusan in Ishikawa Prefecture. It was the second time the 1:10 Electric Off-Road World Championship had taken place in Japan since 1995.

Neil Cragg of the United Kingdom and Ryan Cavaileri of the United States were the defending champions in 2WD and 4WD respectively; the championship was won by Japan's Hayato Matsuzaki of Japan and Jared Tebo of the United States in their respective classes.

== Circuit ==
Hakusan Arena, also known as Ichirino RC Plaza, is owned by Hakusan Ichirino RC Club. It consisted of two circuits, each for on- and off-road racing. The off-road circuit was 185 m (607 ft) long with a 30 m (98 ft) long straight; the track is 3 m (9.8 ft) and 6 m (20 ft) wide per IFMAR regulations of the time. From 2001 until 2007, both circuits had hosted six JMRCA All-Japan Championships. The off-road circuit had the same layout as the one used in the 1:8 All-Japan; the surface was the same clay soil used for roof tiles.

== Report ==
=== Race ===
==== 2WD ====
===== A-main, leg 1 =====
The race began when the TQ, Hayato Matsuzaki with Ryan Maifield, gradually caught towards him then took the lead when Matsuzaki turned too early under pressure and crashed at the off-camber corner. Matsuzaki was then chased by Jared Tebo and Ryan Cavalieri, allowing them to pass when Matsuzaki crashed again. Repeated mistakes helped him finish sixth, while Americans Maifield, Tebo and Cavalieri held onto their positions to finish the race.

===== A-main, leg 2 =====
Matsuzaki made up for his error in the previous leg by taking a quick lead shortly after the start. Mike Truhe followed him but not for long; Matsuzaki increased his pace. Masami Hirosaka, fourth-place finisher in the previous leg, was the quicker driver; he began to make his way through the field in the closing stage. He unsuccessfully attempted several maneuvers against Matsuzaki, who won.

===== A-main, leg 3 =====
Matsuzaki led Truhe and Maifield from pole but Maifield soon passed Truhe, enabling him to challenge Matsuzaki. Maifield made an error over the moguls that enabled Truhe to pass him. Truhe was eventually passed by Tebo for second place. The pair battled throughout the rest of the race; Tebo beat Truhe by barely a tenth of a second. Matsuzaki, having won the previous leg, was crowned the championship winner.

==== 4WD ====
===== A-main, leg 1 =====
Jörn Neumann's car began to have problems when its motor moved during the warmup lap. Team manager Gerd Strenge had to race to get the car repaired in time, with 30 seconds before the first heat was due to start. Masami Hirosaka began to lose pace after he was marshalled twice during the opening lap. The heat became a battle between Top Qualifier Jared Tebo and Ryan Maifield, who pulled away from Ryan Cavalieri and the rest of the field. During the final lap, Maifield rolled, enabling Tebo to maintain a comfortable lead until he rolled himself. Tebo kept the lead because Maifield was unable to close in on time.

===== A-main, leg 2 =====
Tebo led the second heat with Maifield and Hirosaka trailing behind. At the main straight toward the end of the first lap, Maifield saw an opportunity to overtake Tebo then rolled his car. Maifield fell back several places. Hirosaka took the next available opportunity to challenge Tebo for a few laps before crashing, which gave Tebo a comfortable lead until the end of the heat that earned him his title. Cavalieri was able to overtake Hirosaka for a second-place finish.

===== A-main, leg 3 =====
As the newly crowned champion, Tebo sat out of this heat, leaving Maifield to start in front. The driver to challenge him was Cavalieri, who rolled over on the mogul section as he attempted to make a pass. Cavalieri became more determined; he improved his lap times until the final lap when he was able to challenge Maifield. He came up on the inside of Maifield at the left hand sweeper and stepped out, causing him to spin and leave Cavalieri to finish second. The heat-winner Maifield finish second place overall.

== Classification ==
=== 2WD ===
					A1					A2					A3					Total	
Pos.	No.	Driver	Car	Motor	Pos.	Time	Laps	FL	Pt.	Pos.	Time	Laps	FL	Pt.	Pos.	Time	Laps	FL	Pt.	Pt.	Time
1	1	(Japan) Hayato Matsuzaki	Associated RC10B4	Checkpoint	7	5:24.199	11	27.490	4	1	5:06.146	11	27.245	10	1	5:05.603	11	27.040	10	20	
2	7	(United States) Jared Tebo	Associated RC10B4	Checkpoint	2	5:13.703	11	27.366	9	3	5:09.179	11	27.171	8	2	5:07.635	11	26.969	9	18	
3	3	(United States) Ryan Maifield	Associated RC10B4	Reedy	1	5:11.984	11	27.036	10	5	5:11.708	11	26.359	6	10	2:30.676	5	27.071	1	17	
4	5	(Japan) Masami Hirosaka	Associated RC10B4	Reedy	4	5:18.211	11	27.378	7	2	5:07.201	11	26.923	9	8	5:21.421	11	27.459	3	16	
5	2	(United States) Mike Truhe	Team Losi XXX-CR	Novak	8	5:24.879	11	27.577	3	4	5:10.413	11	27.462	7	3	5:07.718	11	26.812	8	15	
6	4	(United States) Ryan Cavalieri	Associated RC10B4	Reedy	3	5:17.100	11	27.233	8	6	5:12.285	11	27.143	5	4	5:12.433	11	26.485	7	15	
7	10	(United States) Mark Pavidis	Kyosho Ultima RB5	Orion	5	5:21.722	11	27.127	6	9	5:18.722	11	26.363	2	5	5:17.860	11	26.663	6	12	
8	8	(United Kingdom) Paul Bradby	Associated RC10B4	Novak	9	5:00.087	10	27.377	2	7	5:15.117	11	27.160	4	6	5:18.841	11	27.354	5	9	
9	6	(United Kingdom) Lee Martin	Associated RC10B4	Novak	6	5:23.602	11	27.404	5	10	5:25.471	11	27.483	1	7	5:19.616	11	27.585	4	9	
10	9	(United States) Travis Amezcua	Associated RC10B4	Checkpoint	10	2:38.778	5	27.966	1	8	5:16.867	11	27.441	3	9	5:28.082	11	27.581	2	5	

=== 4WD ===
					A1					A2					A3					Total	
Pos.	No	Driver	Car	Motor	Pos.	Time	Laps	FL	Pt.	Pos.	Time	Laps	FL	Pt.	Pos.	Time	Laps	FL	Pt.	Pt.	Time
1	1	(United States) Jared Tebo	Associated RC10B44	Checkpoint	1	5:07.618	12	25.086	10	1	5:10.063	12	25.326	10	10	-.---	0	-.---	0	20	
2	3	(United States) Ryan Maifield	Associated RC10B44	Reedy	2	5:08.185	12	24.928	9	7	5:31.868	12	24.942	4	1	5:09.880	12	25.428	10	19	
3	4	(United States) Ryan Cavalieri	Associated RC10B44	Reedy	3	5:15.859	12	25.336	8	2	5:12.974	12	25.097	9	2	5:11.961	12	24.956	9	18	
4	3	(Japan) Masami Hirosaka	Yokomo MR4-BX	Reedy	5	5:22.494	12	25.466	6	3	5:17.759	12	25.152	8	4	5:14.872	12	24.883	7	15	
5	8	(United States) Billy Easton	Serpent S500	Speed Passion	6	5:22.791	12	25.531	5	4	5:21.017	12	25.851	7	8	4:33.680	10	25.713	3	13	
6	5	(Japan) Atsushi Hara	Hot Bodies D4	Checkpoint	4	5:22.089	12	24.993	7	6	5:21.925	12	25.595	5	9	54.150	2	25.626	2	12	
7	9	(United States) Rick Hohwart	Associated RC10B44	Reedy	9	5:00.727	11	25.500	2	5	5:21.200	12	25.670	6	5	5:21.855	12	25.857	6	12	
8	6	(Japan) Hayato Matsuzaki	Hot Bodies D4	Checkpoint	10	5:01.717	11	25.601	1	8	5:02.503	11	25.940	3	3	5:14.223	12	25.303	8	11	
9	10	(Japan) Naoto Matsukura	Yokomo MR4-BX	Reedy	8	5:24.747	12	25.779	3	9	5:03.723	11	25.739	2	6	5:24.032	12	25.651	5	8	
10	7	(Germany) Jörn Neumann	Serpent S500	Orion	7	5:24.513	12	26.059	4	10	5:08.942	11	25.853	1	7	5:25.645	12	25.531	4	8	

== See also ==
IFMAR Worlds taking place in Japan

- 2015 IFMAR 1:10 Electric Off-Road World Championship
