= 2013 IFMAR 1:10 Electric Off-Road World Championships =

Coordinates: 39.7195494°N 121.811245°W

Event Information
- Event Title: 2013 IFMAR 1:10 Electric Off-Road World Championships
- Dates run: 22–29 September 2013

Club Information
- Club Name: Silver Dollar R/C Raceway
- Location: , California
- Host country: USA

Vehicle Specification
- Class: 1:10 Electric Offroad Buggy

2wd Title
- First: (United States) Jared Tebo; Kyosho Ultima RB6

4WD Title
- First: (United States) Steve Hartson; Associated RC10B44.2

The 2013 IFMAR 1:10 Electric Off-Road World Championships was the fifteenth edition of the IFMAR - 1:10 Electric Off-Road World Championship was held in America. The track is located at Silver Dollar Fairgrounds and is on a large purpose built 150’×110’ dirt track.

== Schedule ==
2WD - Class
Sunday 22nd Sept: Registration, Opening Ceremony
Monday 23rd Sept: Practice
Tuesday 24th Sept: Practice, 4 Qualifying Rounds
Wednesday 25th Sept: Q5, Finals

4WD - Class
Thursday 26th Sept: Registration
Friday 27th Sept: Practice
Saturday 28th Sept: Practice, 4 Qualifying Rounds
Sunday 29th Sept: Q5, Finals

== Results ==
=== 2WD ===
			Qual.	Final 1					Final 2					Final 3					Total					Ref.
Pos.	Driver	Car	Qual.	Pos.	Laps	Time	FL	Pt.	Pos.	Laps	Time	FL	Pt.	Pos.	Laps	Time	FL	Pt.	Total	Disc	Net	Lap	Time	Ref.
1	Jared Tebo (USA)	Kyosho; RB6	1	1	11	5:16.062		10	1	11	5:13.523		10	10	DNS			1	21	1	20	22	10:29.585	
2	Lee Martin (GBR)	Tamiya; TRF 201XM	3	3	11	5:19.603		8	4	11	5:15.353		7	1	11	5:08.876		10	25	7	18	22	10:24.229	
3	Ryan Maifield (USA)	Associated	6	10	4	1:57.563		1	2	11	5:13.777		9	2	11	5:13.278		9	19	1	18	22	10:27.055	
4	Ryan Cavalieri (USA)	Associated; B4.2 w/ Centro C4.2	2	4	11	5:19.759		7	3	11	5:14.966		8	3	11	5:15.748		8	23	7	16	22	10:30.714	
5	Neil Cragg (USA)	Associated	10	2	11	5:19.603		9	5	11	5:20.126		6	9	4	1:48.972		2	17	2	15	22	10:39.729	
6	Dustin Evans (USA)	Losi; 22.2	4	5	11	5:24.591		6	6	11	5:21.992		5	4	11	5:22.647		7	18	5	13	22	10:44.639	
7	Darren Bloomfield (GBR)	Losi; 22.2	7	7	10	5:00.91		4	7	11	5:30.094		4	5	11	5:25.838		6	14	4	10	22	10:55.932	
8	David Ronnefalk (SWE)	Kyosho; RB6	8	6	11	5:29.088		5	10	10	5:05.38		1	7	10	5:00.357		4	10	1	9	21	10:29.445	
9	Kody Numedahl (USA)	Associated	9	8	10	5:03.083		3	8	11	5:32.022		3	6	11	5:29.231		5	11	3	8	22	10:61.253	
10	Naoto Matsukura (JPN)	Yokomo; B-Max 2 MR	5	9	10	5:06.197		2	9	10	5:01.651		2	8	10	5:27.075		3	7	2	5	20	10:07.848	

			Qual.	Final					Ref.
Pos.	Driver	Car	Qual.	Pos.	Laps	Time	FL	Pt.	Ref.
11	Ty Tessmann (CAN)	Kyosho; Ultima RB6	B	1	11	5:09.271			
12	Steven Hartson (USA)		B	2	11	5:12.931			
13	Marc Rheinard (GER)		B	3	11	5:18.383			
14	Mike Truhe (USA)		B	4	11	5:20.05			
15	Christopher Krapp (GER)		B	5	11	5:22.219			
16	Dakotah Phend (USA)		B	6	11	5:25.346			
17	Tanner Denney (USA)		B	7	11	5:28.984			
18	Ryan Lutz (USA)		B	8	11	5:31.124			
19	Yusuke Sugiura (JPN)		B	9	10	5:02.495			
20	Joern Neumann (GER)		B	10	10	5:29.886			
21	Chad Due (USA)		C	1	11	5:20.332			
22	Tom Cockerill (GBR)	Schumacher; Cougar SV2 Modified	C	2	11	5:22.503			
23	Billy Easton (USA)	Serpent; Spyder SRX2	C	3	11	5:28.403			
24	Nolan Anderson (USA)	Associated; RC10	C	4	11	5:30.441			
25	Tyler Vik (USA)		C	5	10	5:59.9			
26	Peter Pinisch (AUT)		C	6	10	5:03.984			
27	Travis Amezcua (USA)		C	7	10	5:03.525			
28	Tom Yardy (GBR)		C	8	10	5:05.918			
29	J.R. Mitch (USA)		C	9	10	5:06.835			
30	Simon Moss (GBR)		C	10	10	5:11.245			
31	Oliver Scholz (GER)	Team C TM2	D	1	11	5:26.099			
32	Drew Moller (USA)		D	2	10	5:00.48			
33	Eric Albano (USA)		D	3	10	5:03.049			
34	Rick Hohwart (USA)		D	4	10	5:04.672			
35	Austin Blair (USA)		D	5	10	5:07.346			
36	Brian Strange (USA)		D	6	10	5:08.779			
37	Carson Wernimont (USA)		D	7	10	5:09.679			
38	Billy Fischer (USA)		D	8	10	5:09.775			
39	Patrick Hofer (SUI)		D	9	10	5:21.235			
40	Cody King (USA)		D	10	6	5:58.105			
41	Barry Baker (USA)		E	1	11	5:21.142			
42	Michal Orlowski (POL)		E	2	11	5:21.784			
43	Rob Gillespie (USA)		E	3	11	5:26.889			
44	Curtis Door (USA)		E	4	11	5:28.449			
45	Brent Thielke (USA)		E	5	10	5:58.685			
46	Joakim Nicolaisen (NOR)		E	6	10	5:00.978			
47	Ryuya Katoh (JPN)		E	7	10	5:10.379			
48	Kohta Akimoto (JPN)		E	8	10	5:16.728			
49	Niclas Mansson (SWE)		E	9	10	5:34.443			
50	Josh Wheeler (USA)		E	10	0	0:00			
51	Christopher Jarosz (USA)		F	1	11	5:24.167			
52	Mitchel Gardner (USA)		F	2	11	5:25.227			
53	Zacarias Villalba Nilson (ESP)		F	3	11	5:28.413			
54	Cody Turner (USA)		F	4	10	5:03.634			
55	Cody Hollis (USA)		F	5	10	5:18.072			
56	Hupo Honigl (AUT)		F	6	10	5:20.033			
57	Taylor Larsen (USA)		F	7	10	5:33.422			
58	Christopher Wheeler (USA)		F	8	9	4:39.219			
59	Otto Ausfelt (SWE)		F	9	6	3:19.361			
60	Jimmy Barnett (USA)		F	10	1	0:21.498			
61	Brian Kinwald (USA)		G	1	11	5:30.502			
62	Andrew Smolnik (USA)		G	2	10	5:09.492			
63	Aaron Alexander (USA)		G	3	10	5:10.763			
64	Oskar Levin (SWE)		G	4	10	5:15.388			
65	Gunnar Rieck (USA)		G	5	10	5:16.285			
66	Ari Bakla (AUS)		G	6	10	5:17.241			
67	Petri Ström (FIN)		G	7	10	5:19.827			
68	Juliya Kajiwara (JPN)		G	8	9	4:42.171			
69	Wayne Wyrick (USA)		G	9	7	3:39.635			
70	Mike Gay (USA)		G	10	0	0:00			
71	Daimon Borkowicz (USA)		H	1	11	5:26.874			
72	Jesper Rasmussen (DEN)		H	2	11	5:27.67			
73	Henry Salmen (FIN)		H	3	10	5:05.93			
74	Marcus Luebke (GER)		H	4	10	5:07.812			
75	Andrew Gillett (AUS)		H	5	10	5:10.114			
76	Kevin Motter (USA)		H	6	10	5:11.695			
77	Chad Bradley (USA)		H	7	10	5:14.803			
78	Nicholas Lasley (USA)		H	8	8	5:22.034			
79	Ben Jemison (GBR)		H	9	4	5:19.192			
80	Aaron Lane (USA)		H	10	0	0:00			
81	Jason Corl (USA)		I	1	10	5:03.993			
82	Ramon Nunez Gonzalez (ESP)		I	2	10	5:14.148			
83	Marty Korn (USA)		I	3	10	5:14.957			
84	Miguel Matias (POR)		I	4	10	5:18.862			
85	Ludovic Valtier (FRA)		I	5	10	5:19.171			
86	Aaron Biner (USA)		I	6	10	5:19.744			
87	Dustin Richards (USA)		I	7	10	5:20.392			
88	Verjrak Meen (TPE)		I	8	10	5:28.642			
89	Elliot Boots (GBR)		I	9	3	1:27.696			
90	Niklas Roos (NOR)		I	10	2	1:02.152			
91	Satoshi Maezumi (JPN)		J	1	11	5:28.653			
92	Brian McDuffie (USA)		J	2	10	5:13.332			
93	Patrick Vogt (SUI)		J	3	10	5:18.929			
94	Alexis Dufau Cazenave (FRA)		J	4	10	5:20.057			
95	Trever Adamo (USA)		J	5	10	5:21.963			
96	David Henry (CAN)		J	6	10	5:23.606			
97	Kurt Wenger (USA)		J	7	10	5:30.075			
98	Jeffrey Guest (USA)		J	8	10	5:33.195			
99	Abiye Birku (CAN)		J	9	9	5:12.181			
100	Julien Formentin (FRA)		J	10	6	3:12.359			
101	Matthew Primmer (AUS)		K	1	10	5:14.761			
102	Scott Jones (AUS)		K	2	10	5:18.973			
103	Daniel Kobbevik (SWE)		K	3	10	5:39.083			
104	JB Catricala (CAN)		K	4	9	5:06.783			
105	Karl-johan Svensson (SWE)		K	5	9	5:10.433			
106	Josh Pain (AUS)	Yokomo; B-Max 2	K	6	9	5:22.18			
107	Jarred King (AUS)		K	7	7	3:56.159			
108	Martin Sorlie (NOR)		K	8	3	1:25.044			
109	Jussi Luopajarvi (FIN)		K	9	0	0:00			
110	Antoine Rossetti (FRA)		K	10	0	0:00			
111	Zach Genova (USA)		L	1	10	5:21.191			
112	James Arluck (USA)		L	2	10	5:24.622			
113	Olivier De Montfumat (FRA)		L	3	10	5:26.179			
114	Bartlomiej Zambrzycki (POL)		L	4	10	5:29.436			
115	Arne-peder Flesvik (NOR)		L	5	9	5:02.253			
116	Shunsuke Koike (JPN)		L	6	9	5:03.177			
117	Alex Guerrero (USA)		L	7	9	5:05.887			
118	Ben Panic (SGP)		L	8	9	5:07.028			
119	Frank Lemke (GER)		L	9	9	5:13.431			
120	Peter Stein (DEN)		L	10	1	0:27.648			
121	Austin Venezia (USA)		M	1	10	5:18.35			
122	Derek McCloskey (IRL)		M	2	10	5:30.194			
123	Tod Trower (AUS)		M	3	10	5:32.653			
124	Frode Skauen (NOR)		M	4	9	5:01.802			
125	Magne Kobbevik (NOR)		M	5	9	5:11.061			
126	Cedric Devillers (FRA)		M	6	9	5:27.53			
127	Christer Rasmussen (DEN)		M	7	4	2:07.651			
128	Tom Wright (CAN)		M	8	4	2:21.982			
129	Ashley Peeler (AUS)		M	9	4	2:30.752			
130	Sven Rudig (AUT)		M	10	2	1:05.72			
131	Felix Law (HKG)		N	1	10	5:23.4			
132	Eric Deschenes (CAN)		N	2	10	5:32.4			
133	Nicklas Ackander (SWE)		N	3	9	5:06.735			
134	Dmitry Gribov (RUS)		N	4	9	5:08.676			
135	Scott Yang (TPE)		N	5	9	5:09.156			
136	Pedro Espejo (ESP)		N	6	9	5:21.274			
137	Kai Koivuranta (SWE)		N	7	9	5:26.265			
138	Michael Bolger (IRL)		N	8	9	5:30.097			
139	Chi Hang Tang (HKG)		N	9	8	4:52.351			
140	Evgeny Timoschenko (RUS)		N	10	8	5:02.501			
141	Daniel Watt (AUS)		N	11	2	1:04.62			

=== 4WD ===
			Qual.	Final 1					Final 2					Final 3					Total					Ref.
Pos.	Driver	Car	Qual.	Pos.	Laps	Time	FL	Pt.	Pos.	Laps	Time	FL	Pt.	Pos.	Laps	Time	FL	Pt.	Total	Disc	Net	Lap	Time	Ref.
1	Steven Hartson (USA)	Associated; B44.2	A-6	1	11	5:00.626		10	5	11	5:05.597		6	1	12	5:30.093		10	26	6	20	23	10:30.719	
2	Naoto Matsukura (JPN)	Yokomo; B-Max4 III	A-8	3	11	5:04.84		8	1	12	5:26.089		10	2	12	5:35.809		9	27	8	19	24	10:61.898	
3	Ty Tessmann (CAN)	Hot Bodies; D4-13	A-3	2	11	5:02.614		9	4	11	5:04.752		7	3	11	5:00.163		8	24	7	17	22	10:02.777	
4	Jörn Neumann (GER)	Durango; DEX410 Proto	A-1	4	11	5:04.625		7	3	11	5:00.287		8	7	11	5:09.805		4	19	4	15	22	10:04.912	
5	Ryan Cavalieri (USA)	Associated; B44.2	A-2	5	11	5:04.966		6	9	1	0:17.331		2	4	11	5:00.368		7	15	2	13	22	10:05.334	
6	Ryan Lutz (USA)	Durango; DEX-410 V3	A-7	9	9	4:10.499		2	2	12	5:27.645		9	10	6	2:42.978		1	12	1	11	21	9:38.144	
7	Travis Amezcua (USA)	Durango; Prototype "Shorty"	A-9	10	2	0:48.937		1	7	11	5:06.919		4	5	11	5:05.079		6	11	1	10	22	10:11.998	
8	Dakotah Phend (USA)	Losi; TLR22-4	A-10	8	11	5:11.809		3	6	11	5:06.321		5	6	11	5:09.186		5	13	3	10	22	10:15.507	
9	Ryan Maifield (USA)	Associated; 0	A-4	6	11	5:05.349		5	10	1	0:18.043		1	8	8	3:45.193		3	9	1	8	19	8:50.542	
10	Lee Martin (GBR)	Tamiya; TRF511	A-5	7	11	5:07.938		4	8	1	1:47.418		3	9	7	3:12.538		2	9	2	7	18	8:20.476	

			Qual.	Final					Ref.
Pos.	Driver	Car	Qual.	Pos.	Laps	Time	FL	Pt.	Ref.
11	Neil Cragg (GBR)	Associated; B44.2	B	1	11	5:03.97			
12	Rick Hohwart (USA)	Losi	B	2	11	5:04.223			
13	Marc Rheinard (GER)		B	3	11	5:04.355			
14	Hupo Hönigl (AUT)		B	4	11	5:04.875			
15	Christopher Krapp (GER)		B	5	11	5:06.131			
16	Darren Bloomfield (GBR)		B	6	11	5:13.533			
17	Carson Wernimont (USA)		B	7	11	5:13.727			
18	David Ronnefalk (SWE)		B	8	11	5:19.039			
19	Kody Numedahl (USA)		B	9	10	4:36.968			
20	Tom Cockerill (GBR)		B	10	10	4:38.36			
21	Patrick Hofer (SUI)		C	1	11	5:09.437			
22	Brian Strange (USA)		C	2	11	5:11.178			
23	Josh Wheeler (USA)	Xray; XB 4	C	3	11	5:11.696			
24	Cody Hollis (USA)		C	4	11	5:13.971			
25	Curtis Door (USA)		C	5	111	5:27.698			
26	Tanner Denney (USA)		C	6	10	5:05.782			
27	Tom Yardy (GBR)		C	7	10	5:15.19			
28	Chad Due (USA)		C	8	5	2:15.36			
29	Yusuke Sugiura (JPN)		C	9	3	1:20.293			
30	Tyler Vik (USA)	Xray; XB 4	C	10	0	0:00			
31	Barry Baker (USA)		D	1	11	5:01.598			
32	Peter Pinisch (AUT)		D	2	11	5:06.638			
33	Dustin Evans (USA)		D	3	11	5:07.727			
34	Michal Orlowski (POL)		D	4	11	5:09.357			
35	Mike Truhe (USA)		D	5	11	5:14.675			
36	Ari Bakla (AUS)		D	6	11	5:15.092			
37	Billy Fischer (USA)		D	7	11	5:20.91			
38	Jason Corl (USA)		D	8	11	5:21.595			
39	Gunnar Rieck (USA)		D	9	8	3:50.564			
40	Rob Gillespie (USA)		D	10	5	2:19.447			
41	Nolan Anderson (USA)		E	1	11	5:09.141			
42	Josh Pain (AUS)		E	2	11	5:09.923			
43	Andrew Smolnik (USA)		E	3	11	5:10.172			
44	Jared Tebo (USA)	Kyosho; Lazer ZX-5	E	4	11	5:10.698			
45	Ben Jemison (GBR)		E	5	11	5:12.31			
46	Brent Thielke (USA)		E	6	11	5:12.555			
47	Taylor Larsen (USA)		E	7	11	5:15.896			
48	Joakim Nicolaisen (NOR)		E	8	11	5:20.5			
49	Oskar Levin (SWE)		E	9	11	5:32.623			
50	Aaron Alexander (USA)		E	10	9	4:24.541			
51	Cody King (USA)		F	1	11	5:03.707			
52	Miguel Matias (POR)		F	2	11	5:09.268			
53	Oliver Scholz (GER)		F	3	11	5:16.232			
54	Dustin Richards (USA)		F	4	11	5:17.85			
55	Eric Albano (USA)		F	5	11	5:26.388			
56	Abiye Birku (CAN)		F	6	11	5:27.507			
57	Niklas Bjørkå Roos (NOR)		F	7	10	5:00.234			
58	Chad Bradley (USA)		F	8	10	5:00.234			
59	Kohta Akimoto (JPN)		F	9	5	5:21.884			
60	Brian Kinwald (USA)		F	10	0	0:00			
61	Otto Ausfelt (SWE)		G	1	11	5:15.757			
62	Kevin Motter (USA)		G	2	11	5:19.533			
63	Andrew Gillett (AUS)		G	3	11	5:23.997			
64	JR Mitch (USA)		G	4	11	5:24.654			
65	Zacarias Villalba Nilsson (ESP)		G	5	11	5:25.426			
66	Jimmy Barnett (USA)		G	6	11	5:28.258			
67	Niclas Mansson (SWE)		G	7	10	5:04.358			
68	Patrick Vogt (SUI)		G	8	10	5:05.962			
69	Satoshi Maezumi (JPN)		G	9	9	4:31.897			
70	Petri Ström (FIN)		G	10	5	2:29.36			
71	Meen Vejrak (TPE)		H	1	11	5:09.37			
72	Jeff Guest (USA)		H	2	11	5:15.109			
73	Drew Moller (USA)		H	3	11	5:18.537			
74	Jesper Rasmussen (DEN)		H	4	11	5:20.582			
75	Marty Korn (USA)	SWORKz; S104	H	5	11	5:28.71			
76	John Ben Catricala (CAN)		H	6	10	5:12.506			
77	Ryuya Katoh (JPN)		H	7	10	5:14.916			
78	Austin Blair (USA)		H	8	8	3:44.642			
79	Mike Gay (USA)		H	9	7	5:17.89			
80	Jarred King (AUS)		H	10	3	1:41.915			
81	Henry Salmén (FIN)		I	1	11	5:17.38			
82	Daimon Borkowicz (USA)		I	2	11	5:23.88			
83	Aaron Biner (USA)		I	3	11	5:29.515			
84	Daniel Kobbevik (NOR)		I	4	11	5:32.416			
85	Brian McDuffie (USA)		I	5	10	5:01.107			
86	James Arluck (USA)		I	6	10	5:03.752			
87	Trever Adamo (USA)		I	7	10	5:10.353			
88	Mathew Primmer (AUS)		I	8	10	5:30.829			
89	Cody Turner (USA)		I	9	4	1:55.39			
90	Ludovic Valtier (FRA)		I	10	4	2:00.673			
91	Chris Jarosz (USA)		J	1	11	5:18.756			
92	Olivier De Montfumat (FRA)		J	2	11	5:25.164			
93	David Henry (CAN)		J	3	11	5:26.906			
94	Kurt Wenger (USA)		J	4	10	5:04.933			
95	Simon Moss (GBR)		J	5	9	4:33.31			
96	Juliya Kajiwara (JPN)		J	6	8	3:48.196			
97	Alex Guerrero (USA)		J	7	8	5:22.855			
98	Jussi Luopajärvi (FIN)		J	8	4	2:31.363			
99	Karl-Johan Svensson (SWE)		J	9	4	2:32.882			
100	Elliott Boots (GBR)		J	10	3	1:39.882			
101	Nicholas Lasley (USA)		K	1	11	5:10.154			
102	Alexis Dufau-Cazenave (FRA)		K	2	11	5:21.621			
103	Sven Rudig (AUT)		K	3	11	5:30.749			
104	Chris Wheeler (USA)		K	4	10	4:49.727			
105	Ramón Nuño Nunez Gonzalez (ESP)		K	5	10	5:04.088			
106	Dmitry Gribov (RUS)		K	6	10	5:40.637			
107	Bartlomiej Zambrzycki (POL)		K	7	7	3:34.216			
108	Shunsuke Koike (JPN)		K	8	1	0:17.937			
109	Antoine Rossetti (FRA)		K	9	1	0:22.865			
110	Julien Formentin (FRA)		K	10	0	0:00			
111	Marcus Lübke (GER)		L	1	11	5:20.717			
112	Felix Law (USA)		L	2	11	5:25.486			
113	Ben Panic (SIN)		L	3	10	5:02.237			
114	Martin Sørlie (NOR)		L	4	10	5:11.355			
115	Derek McCloskey (IRL)		L	5	10	5:21.015			
116	Wayne Wyrick (USA)		L	6	9	4:48.406			
117	Zack Genova (USA)		L	7	5	2:39.176			
118	Frode Skauen (NOR)		L	8	1	0:21.913			
119	Tom Wright (CAN)		L	9	0	0:00			
120	Eric Deschenes (USA)		L	10	0	0:00			
121	Scott Jones (AUS)		M	1	11	5:23.73			
122	Frank Lemke (GER)		M	2	11	5:28.102			
123	Chi Hang Tang (CHN)		M	3	11	5:34.223			
124	Nicklas Ackander (SWE)		M	4	10	5:04.304			
125	Michael Bolger (IRL)		M	5	10	5:07.904			
126	Arne-Peder Flesvik (NOR)		M	6	10	5:25.258			
127	Magne Kobbevik (NOR)		M	7	2	0:51.228			
128	Austin Venezia (USA)		M	8	1	0:22.487			
129	Christer Rasmussen (DEN)		M	9	0	0:00			
130	Tod Trower (AUS)		M	10	0	0:00			
131	Cedric Devillers (FRA)		N	1	10	5:03.561			
132	Scott Yang (TPE)		N	2	10	5:03.911			
133	Valtteri Eklund (FIN)		N	3	10	5:08.214			
134	Kai Koivuranta (SWE)		N	4	10	5:17.45			
135	Pedro Ignacio Espejo Zarazaga (ESP)		N	5	10	5:29.843			
136	Evgeny Timoschenko (RUS)		N	6	9	5:18.389			
137	Mitchel Gardner (USA)		N	7	3	1:26.454			
138	Kendall Bennett (USA)		N	8	3	1:39.575			
139	Daniel Watt (AUS)		N	9	0	0:00			
140	Ashley Peeler (AUS)		N	10	0	0:00			
