= Cesare Rossi =

Cesare Rossi may refer to:

- Cesare Rossi (politician) (1887–1967), Italian fascist leader
- Cesare Rossi (rower) (1904–1952), Italian rower
- Cesare Rossi (businessman)
