= 2009 IFMAR 1:10 Electric Off-Road World Championships =

Coordinates: 25.714500°S 28.268577°E

2009 IFMAR 1:10 scale Electric Off-Road World Championships was the 13th running of the IFMAR 1:10 Electric Off-Road World Championship for 1:10 radio-controlled electric off-road buggies sanctioned by the International Federation of Model Auto Racing (IFMAR) that ran over two separate classes (2WD and 4WD).

The national sanctioning body, South African Radio Driver's Association (SARDA) acted as a host nation on behalf of Fourth Association of Model Auto Racing (FAMAR) with Tshwane Raceway and Promotions (TRAP) acting as the host organization for the championship. taking place at the TRAP R/C Venue, located in Koedoespoort, Pretoria, in which they own. In traditions with the other championships, the warm-up event was integrated into the host's national championship, the 6th African Cup.

The event along with the 1:5 Large Scale Worlds, also hosted by TRAP the previous month, would be remembered for being heavily boycotted by factory teams and drivers over security issues, as competitors were concerned for their safety following a number of incidents in 2002, notably involving Masami Hirosaka and the future IFMAR president Dallas Mathiesen, resulting to the assailant being swiftly dealt with and handed over to the police by the latter. This meant that a majority of entries consisted of South African drivers and three international entries. As a result of this, for the Electric On-Road Worlds (ISTC and 1:12 On-Road) due to take place in South Africa the following year, IFMAR stripped the organizer of its hosting rights and reallocated to MAC Burgdorf in Germany. At the time when the IFMAR ISTC World Championship was still in session in 2016; with South Africa being the only FAMAR bloc nation to apply, they were awarded hosting rights to host the Electric On-Road events for 2018.

The 2WD and 4WD championships was won by Martin Achter, driving an Associated RC10B4 and Durango DEX410 respectively; despite the circumstances, he became the third driver to win both titles in a single host Worlds and second in the off-road Worlds. This became his only international championship A-main appearance.

== Results ==
=== 2WD ===
					A1					A2					A3					Total	
Pos.	No	Driver	Car	Motor	Pos.	Time	Laps	FL	Pt.	Pos.	Time	Laps	FL	Pt.	Pos.	Time	Laps	FL	Pt.	Pt.	Time
1	1	(Germany) Martin Achter	Durango	CS						1					1						
2	2	(Australia) Craig Laughton	Associated		1																
3	3	(South Africa) Albert Claassens	Associated																		
4	4	(South Africa) Dean Steenmans	Losi																		
5	5	(South Africa) Gerrit Gouws	Associated B4																		
6	7	(South Africa) Charles Hollander	Losi																		
7	8	(South Africa) Jaco van Eeden																			
8	6	(South Africa) Brandon Joynt																			
9	10	(Germany) Stefan Ippy																			
10	9	(South Africa) Stefan Fourie																			

=== 4WD ===
==== A-Main ====
					A1					A2					A3						
Pos.	No	Driver	Car	Motor	Pos.	Time	Laps	FL	Pt.	Pos.	Time	Laps	FL	Pt.	Pos.	Time	Laps	FL	Pt.	Pt.	Time
1	1	(Germany) Martin Achter	Associated	CS	1					1					10						
2		(South Africa) Gerrit Gouws	Associated B4		4					4					1						
3		(Australia) Craig Laughton	Hot Bodies D4		9					3					2						
4		(South Africa) Brandon Joynt	Kyosho		3					2					6						
5		(South Africa) Guilherme de Sousa			5					7					3						
6		(Germany) Stefan Ippy			6					6					4						
7		(South Africa) Jaco van Eeden			2					9					9						
8		(South Africa) Rikus Jansen van Vuuren			7					5					7						
9		(South Africa) Kenny Morey			8					10					5						
10		(South Africa) Albert Claassens			10					8					8						

== See also ==
Events marred by boycott threats

- 2006 IFMAR 1:8 IC Off-Road World Championship
- 2009 IFMAR 1:5 IC Touring Car World Championship
- 2011 IFMAR 1:8 IC On-Road World Championship
- 2013 IFMAR 1:8 IC On-Road World Championship

In contrast to

- 2008 IFMAR 1:8 IC Off-Road World Championship
- 2016 IFMAR 1:8 IC Off-Road World Championship

IFMAR Worlds events that took place in South Africa

- 2002 IFMAR 1:10 Electric Off-Road World Championships
- 2002 IFMAR On-Road World Championships
  - 2002 IFMAR 1:12 Electric On-Road World Championship
  - 2002 IFMAR 1:10 ISTC World Championship
- 2018 IFMAR On-Road World Championships
  - 2018 IFMAR 1:12 Electric On-Road World Championship
  - 2018 IFMAR 1:10 ISTC World Championship
