= IFMAR 1:12 Electric Track World Championship =

World championship radio controlled car race

The IFMAR World Championship for 1:12 Electric Cars. Racing in 1/12th has moved between touring car and pan car bodies and from outdoor asphault track to indoor carperts. Asphault racing is now focused on 1:10 scale as has the touring car style bodies.

== Events ==
Edition			Event			Venue				Competitors			Ref.
No.	Date	Year	Car	Surface	Setting	Circuit	Location	Country	Bloc	No.	Nations	Bloc	Ref.
1		1982	Std LMP	Asphalt	Outdoors	Grand Hotel	Anaheim, California	United States	ROAR				
1		1982	Mod			Grand Hotel	Anaheim, California	United States	ROAR				
2		1984	Std LMP	Asphalt	Indoors	Herning Kongrescenter	Herning	Denmark	EFRA |				
2		1984	Mod			Herning Kongrescenter	Herning	Denmark	EFRA |				
3		1986				Tropicana Hotel	Las Vegas, Nevada	United States	ROAR				
4		1988		Indoor	Carpet		Baarn	Netherlands					
5		1990		Indoor	Carpet	Ngee Ann Polytechnic		Singapore					
6		1992					Grand Rapids, Michigan	United States					
7		1994					Paris	France			Indoors	Carpet	
8		1996				Revelation Raceway	Montclair, California	United States	ROAR				
9		1998	LMP	Capret; Primafelt	Indoors			United Kingdom		75	14	4	
10		2000				Yatabe Arena		Japan		51	9	4	
11	5	2002	LMP	Tarmac	Outdoors	Keywest Model Car Club	Krugersdorp, Gauteng	South Africa					
12	10	2004				Kissimmee R/C Raceway	Kissimmee, Florida	United States	ROAR				
13	7	2006	Pan	Carpet	Indoors	AF Model Rings	Collegno	Italy		80	17	4	
14		2008				Radio Control Speedway	Bangkok	Thailand					
15		2010	LMP	CRC Carpet	Indoor	Mehrzweckhalle Gymnasium Burgdorf	Burgdorf, Hanover	Germany					
16		2012	LMP	Carpet	Indoor	Kennemer Sportcenter	Heemstede	Netherlands	EFRA				
17		2014	LMP	CRC Carpet	Indoors	Minnreg Hall	Largo, Florida	United States					
18		2016	LMP	ETS Carpet	Indoors	Fengtai Sports Center	Beijing	China	FEMCA				
19		2018				Welkom RC Arena	Welkom	South Africa					
19		2018	Modified			Welkom RC Arena	Welkom	South Africa					
20	Jan	2020	Modified			MK Shopping Centre	Milton Keynes	United Kingdom		56	15	4	
20	Jan	2020	Stock		Indoord	MK Shopping Centre	Milton Keynes	United Kingdom		60	11	3	
21		2023	Modified			Beachline Raceway	Florida	United States		19	9	3	
21		2023	Stock			Beachline Raceway	Florida	United States		55	6	2	
N/A	March	2026	Stock; Modified				Foshan	China		CANCELLED (Iran Conflict)			

== World Champion & Cars Specifications ==
Note the shaded parts are controlled equipment e.g. not the competitor's choice

Year	Driver	Chassis			Power Electronics				Control Electronics			Tyres			Ref.
Year	Driver	Brand	Model	Bodyshell	Motor	ESC	Battery	Charger	Transmitter	Receiver	Servo	Front	Rear	Inserts	Ref.
1982; Std	Kent Clausen (USA)	Associated	12i				Sanyo /ME					Associated /Sk 1.76"	Associated /Soft 2.025"		
1982; Mod	Arturo Carbonell (USA)	Delta	Super Phaser Proto		IG No. 84	/Sanyo	Letter 3.4A ch					Delta /1240 B 1.85"	Delta /1248 A 2.06 "		
1984; Std	Bud Bartos (USA)	Bud Bartos	Parma Euro Panther												
1984; Mod	Tony Niesinger (USA)	Associated	Associated RC12i												
1986	Tony Neisinger (USA)	Associated	RC12L		Reedy /Greed Quad	Novak	Sanyo /Associated		Futaba			Associated /Green	Associated /Green		
1988	Masami Hirosaka (JPN)	Associated	RC12L	Associated; TOJ	Reedy	Novak	Reedy /SCE		KO			Yokomo	Yokomo		
1990	Chris Doseck (USA)	Associated	RC12LW		CAM /17Q	Novak /410 M1C	Ace Pilot /CAM		KO /EX-1		Airtronics /94143	Yokomo	Yokomo		
1992	Tony Neisinger (USA)	Associated	12LW	Associated; Nissan	Reedy /16x3	Novak /410 HPC	Maxcell /P-170		Airtronics /Caliber		Airtronics /94143	Associated; Yokomo	Associated; Yokomo		
1994	David Spashett (GBR)	Corally	SP12G2	PK; Nissan	Corally /14x3	Helbing /3000			Apex		Sanwa				
1996	Masami Hirosaka (JPN)	Associated	RC12LC	Protoform	Reedy	Tekin			KO Propo			JACO	JACO		
1998	David Spashett (GBR)	Trinity	22.2J	Protoform; Nissan P35	Trinity /D2 14	LRP /Quantum Worlds	Trinity / Sanyo /Vis 2000		KO Propo /Vantage		KO Propo /911 BH	TRC /Purple	TRC /Grey		
2000	Masami Hirosaka (JPN)	Yokomo	High Traction	Andy's; Sauber Mercedes	REEDY /FURY 10X2	GM /V-12W	YOKOMO /Sanyo RC-3000H		KO /Esprit II Vandage	KO /KR-297FZ	KO				
2002	Masami Hirosaka (JPN)	Yokomo	RC12L3Y	Andy's	Reedy	GM Racing					KO Propo				
2004	Masami Hirosaka (JPN)	Associated	RC12L4		Reedy										
2006	David Spashett (GBR)	Corally	SP12X "US Spec"		Peak Vantage 07										
2008	Naoto Matsukura (JPN)	Associated	Associated 12R5	Protoform; AMR-12											
2010	Naoto Matsukura (JPN)	Yokomo	R12	Protoform; AMR-12	NOSRAM										
2012	Naoto Matsukura (JPN)	Yokomo	R12	Protoform; AMR-12											
2014	Marc Rheinard (GER)	CRC	Prototype 6B	Protoform; AMR-12	Muchmore /Fleta ZX 3.5T	Muchmore /Fleta 1S	Thunder /6800mAh 65C		Sanwa	Sanwa	Sanwa	CRC	CRC		
2016	Naoto Matsukura (JPN)	Roche	Prototype	Protoform; AMR	Muchmore /Fleta ZX 3.5T	Muchmore /Fleta Pro	Muchmore /8000mAh		Sanwa		Xpert	Team Bomber	Team Bomber		
2018; Mod	Alexander Hagberg (SWE)	X-Ray	X12 '19		Hobbywing										
2018; Stock	EJ Evans (USA)	X-Ray	X12												
2020; Mod	Marc Rheinard (GER)	Schumacher	Eclipse 3	Protoform	Muchmore				Sanwa			Muchmore			
2020; Stock	Andy Murray (GBR)	Schumacher	Eclipse 3	Montech M20; M30	Hobbywing / trinity	Hobbywing /XR10 Pro 1s HD	LRP /8000 - P4 1/12 Ultra LCG 3.7v		Sanwa /SRG-HR	Sanwa /RX-481	Sanwa /SRG-HT	Control /A32	Control /A 30		
2023	Max Mächler (GER)	Awesomatix	A12	MonTech M20	Hobbywing /G4 13.5T	Hobbywing /XR10 HD PRO1S	Team EAM		Sanwa /M17		MKS HV50P				
2023; Mod	Michal Orlowski (POL)	Schumacher			Hobbywing	Hobbywing	Superdow								
