= Atsushi Hara =

Japanese radio-controlled car racer

Atsushi Hara (原篤志; October 26, 1979) is a Japanese professional radio-controlled car racer from Yokohama, Kanagawa Prefecture. He has won two IFMAR titles and a number of domestic ROAR and JMRCA titles.

He competed in multiple categories of R/C racing, and won world championships in both on-road and off-road racing with electric- and nitro-powered cars.

== Complete R/C Racing summary ==
Bold on results indicates top qualifier

=== IFMAR World Championship results ===
Year	Result	Class	Venue	Entrant	Car	Motor	ESC	Transmitter
2000	1	1:10 EP Touring	Tsukuba City	Yokomo	MR4-TC	Reedy		KO Propo
2008	1	1:8 GP Off-road	Charlotte	HB	D8		N/A	Futaba
2010	2	1:8 GP Off-road		HB	D810		N/A	Futaba
2012	3	1:8 GP Off-road		HB			N/A	Futaba

=== FEMCA Championship ===
Year	Result	Class	Venue	Entrant	Car	Motor	ESC	Transmitter
2005	1	1:8 GP Off-road		Hot Bodies	HBD8		N/A	Futaba
2009	1	1:8 GP Off-road	Glenmarie	Hot Bodies	HB D8		N/A	Futaba
2013	1	1:8 GP Off-road	Fengtai	Mugen			N/A	Futaba
2014	1	1:8 GP Off-road	Fengtai	S-Workz			N/A	Futaba

=== ROAR National Championships ===
Year	Result	Class	Venue	Entrant	Car	Motor	ESC	Transmitter
2003	1	1:10 Fuel Sedan	Ontario California	HPI	HPI R40		N/A	Futaba
2004	1	1:10 Fuel Sedan	Toledo Ohio	HPI	HPI R40		N/A	Futaba
2004	1	1:10 Modified Touring	Largo, Florida	HPI	HPI Pro 4	Orion	Hara Twister	Futuba
2005	1	1:10 Modified Touring	Largo, Florida	HPI	HPI RS4 Pro 4	Orion	Hara Twister	Futaba
2006	1	1:10 Modified Touring		HPI	HPI R40		N/A	Futaba

=== JMRCA All-Japan Championship results ===
A non-first-place finisher highlighted in gold indicates that despite being won by an invited foreign driver, the championship is awarded to the best native driver.

Year	Result	Class	Venue	Entrant	Car	Motor
1999	1	1:10 EP Touring Open	Yatabe	Yokomo	MR4-TC	Reedy
2000	1	1:10 EP Racing	Yatable	Yokomo	MR4-TC	Reedy
2002	1	1:12 EP Racing	Yatabe	Speedmerchant	rev2	Orion
2005	1	1:10 EP Touring Open	Yatabe	Speedmind	Daytona	Orion
2007	1	1:8 GP Off-Road		Hot Bodies	D8	OS
2008	1	1:8 GP Off-Road		Hot Bodies	D8	OS
2009	1	1:8 GP Off-Road		Hot Bodies	D8	OS

=== DHI Cup ===
Year	Result	Class	Venue	Entrant	Car	Motor	ESC	Transmitter
2004	1	1:10 Touring	Odense	HPI	HPI Pro 4	Orion	Hara Twister	Futaba
2005	1	1:10 Touring	Odense	HPI	HPI Pro 4	Orion	Hara Twister	Futaba
