= Team Durango =

Team Durango Ltd
- Company type: Private Limited Company (Ltd.)
- Industry: Racing
- Founded: 2008-2017
- Key people: Gerd Strenge; Michael Vollmer
- Products: Radio-controlled Cars
- Owner: Hobbico
- Website: www.team-durango.com/

Team Durango was a manufacturer and distributor of radio-controlled cars and accessories.

== History ==
The original Durango was developed by Serpent Racing from the Netherlands who teamed up with Gerd Strenge to develop a Serpent-Branded 4WD electric buggy based upon prototype cars designs and built by German racer Gerd Strenge, calling the car the S500. The car was a radical departure from the slab-sided hand-machined prototypes when it first saw the light of day at Nuremberg 2008 however the economic climate meant the car never went into production. Fortunately Gerd Strenge and his designer Michael Vollmer formed at the end of 2008 the brand ‘Team Durango’, launching a redesigned S500 called the DEX410 and making it available to the mass market since September 2009. For many years before then prototype cars designed and built by Gerd had noticeable success against the larger commercial builders on the European racing scene.

The then owners Hobbico discontinued the product in 2017. On January 10, 2018, it was announced that Hobbico had filed for Chapter 11 bankruptcy protection. In June 2018, it was announced that Hobbico had filed for Chapter 7 bankruptcy and went into liquidation.

== Racing ==
=== Podiums at World Championships ===
Position	Year	Title	Driver	Model
1st	2009	IFMAR 4WD Offroad World Championship	Martin Achter (GER)	DEX410
2nd	2011	IFMAR 4WD Offroad World Championship	Jörn Neumann (GER)	DEX410

=== Podiums at National Championships ===
Position	Year	Title	Driver	Model
1st	2010	Finnish 4WD Offroad National Championship		DEX410
1st	2010	French 4WD Offroad National Championship		DEX410
1st	2010	Italian 4WD Offroad National Championship		DEX410
1st	2010	South African 4WD Offroad National Championship		DEX410

== Products ==
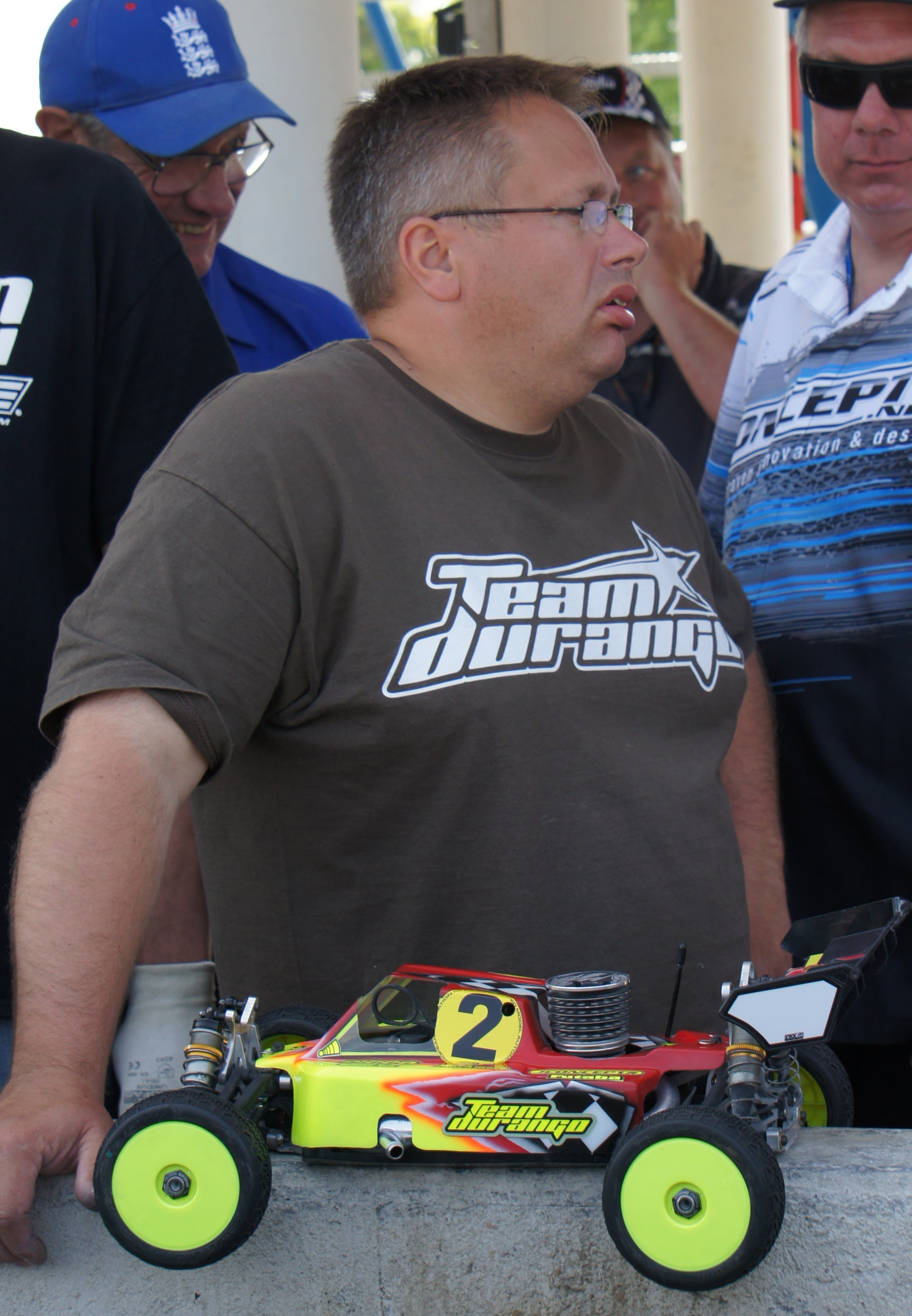
Gerd Strenge with Jörn Neumann's DNX8, 2013 EFRA European 1/8 Off-Road Championship.

=== 1/10 Scale 4WD Electric Onroad Competition Touring Car ===
Date	Name	Details	Kit #
2015-	DETC410v2		#TD102035
2013-2015	DETC410		#TD102023

=== 1/10 Scale 2WD Electric Offroad Competition Buggy ===
Date	Name	Details	Kit #
	DEX210v3		#TD102042
	DEX210v2		#TD102028
	DEX210		#TD102006

DEX210F

=== 1/10 Scale 4WD Electric Offroad Competition Buggy ===
Date	Name	Details	Kit #
2010s - 2017	DEX410v5		TD102036
2010s	DEX410v4		TD102030
2010s	DEX410Rv3		TD102012
2010s	DEX410v3		TD102011
2010–2011	DEX410R	The 'R' is essentially the same car as the original DEX410 but with less of the expensive alloy parts.	TD102003
2009 Sept - 2011	DEX410		TD102001

=== 1/10 Scale 4WD Electric Offroad Truck ===
Date	Name	Details	Kit #
	DESC410R		TD102005

=== 1/8 Scale 4WD Electric Offroad Competition Buggy ===
Date	Name	Details	Kit #
	DEX408		TD102007

=== 1/8 Scale 4WD Nitro Offroad Competition Buggy ===
Date	Name	Details	Kit #
	DNX408		TD102002
