= Fourth Association of Model Auto Racing =

- Sport: Model car racing
- Category: Radio-controlled racing
- Jurisdiction: South America, and South Africa
- Abbreviation: FAMAR
- Founded: 1992
- Affiliation: IFMAR
- President: Edgar Ochiai

Official website
- famar.ws

Fourth Association of Model Auto Racing, otherwise known as FAMAR is the governing body of radio-controlled car racing in South Africa, Mexico, Central and South America. It is one of the four member blocs to be entitled full voting right within IFMAR.

== Member countries ==
- Argentina (Asociación Argentina de Pilotos de Autos a Radiocontrol de Todo Tipo - AAPARTT)
- Bolivia (FEBOLARC)
- Brazil (Federação Brasileira de Automodelismo Rádio Controlado - FEBARC)
- Chile (APARC)
- Colombia (ACA)
- Costa Rica (ACAP)
- Curaçao (CRCCDA)
- Ecuador (CADE)
- Israel (RCZone)
- Mexico (FEMARAC)
- Peru (APERCAR)
- Dominican Republic (Asociación Dominicana de Radio Control - ADORC)
- South Africa (South African Radio Driver's Association - SARDA)
- Trinidad and Tobago (RCMOTT)
- Uruguay (AUDARO)
- Venezuela (Organización Venezolana de Automodelismo O.V.A.)

== FAMAR Championships Winners ==
Year	Scale	Class	Name	Car–Motor	Venue	Location
2009	1:8	IC Off Road	(Israel) Yaniv Sivan	Kyosho MP9 – Sirio KANAI EVO4	N/A	São Paulo (Brazil)
2011	1:8	IC Off Road	(Venezuela) Renato Tradardi Jr.	Associated RC8.2 – Novarossi	XRC Racing	Santiago (Chile)

== Southamerican Championships Winners ==
Year	Scale	Class	Name	Car-Motor	Venue	Location
2006	1:8	IC Off Road				Buenos Aires (Argentina)
2007	1:8	IC Off Road	(Argentina) Adrian Castro	Mugen	CACH	Santiago (Chile)
2008	1:8	IC Off Road	(Venezuela) Miguel Villalobos	Mugen MBX6 - RB	La Lagunita	Caracas (Venezuela)
2009	1:8	IC Off Road	(Brazil) Marco Amaral	Losi 8ight 2.0 - OS Speed		São Paulo (Brazil)
2010	1:8	IC Off Road	(Argentina) Adrian Castro	Losi 8ight 2.0 - Novarossi Toro Nero	Guillermo Tell	Rosario (Argentina)
2011	1:8	IC Off Road	(Venezuela) Renato Tradardi Jr.	Associated RC8.2 - Novarossi	XRC Racing	Santiago (Chile)
2012	1:8	IC Off Road	(Venezuela) Renato Tradardi Jr	Associated RC8.2 - Novarossi	RC-Colombia Team	Bogotá (Colombia)
2013	1:8	IC Off Road	(Venezuela) Daniel Blanco	Associated RC8.2 - Maxy´s 7BT	La Lagunita	Caracas (Venezuela)
2014	1:8	IC Off Road	(Argentina) Agustin Cutini	Mugen MBX7 - Novarossi	Paulinia Racing	São Paulo (Brazil)
2015	1:8	IC Off Road	(Argentina) Agustin Cutini	Mugen MBX7 - Novarossi	Speed Paradise	Buenos Aires (Argentina)
2016	1:8	IC Off Road	(Argentina) Nicolas Bregante	Xray XB8 - Novarossi	La Serrania	Medellín (Colombia)
2017	1:8	IC Off Road	(Argentina) Nicolas Bregante	Xray XB8 - Novarossi Mito 7	Candelaria RC Pro	Santa Cruz (Bolivia)
2016	1:8	GT On Road	(Ecuador) Fabián Rivera Jr.	Serpent Cobra - Maxy´s 4BT	Circuito Miraflores	Quito (Ecuador)
