= Remotely Operated Auto Racers =

- Sport: Radio-controlled car racing
- Jurisdiction: United States, Canada
- Abbreviation: (ROAR)
- Founded: 1967
- Affiliation: IFMAR
- Headquarters: Dallas, Texas
- President: Clayton Young

Official website
- www.roarracing.org
- Other key staff: Executive committee
- (United States)
- (Canada)

Remotely Operated Auto Racers (formerly known as Radio Operated Auto Racing), abbreviated as ROAR, is the sanctioning body of competitive radio-controlled car racing in the United States and Canada. It is a US national non profit organization that promotes the sport of radio controlled model car racing.

== History ==
ROAR was originally organized in 1967 By George Siposs and Norb Meyer and a small group of people dedicated to forming competitive Radio Controlled Car Racing and was the first organization in the world to sanction competitive Model Car Racing. In 1968 the first ROAR National Championship race was held at Sunset Ford car dealership in Garden Grove, California using 1/8th scale nitro pan cars. ROAR has steadily grown and evolved as the sport has grown. ROAR is the oldest sanctioning body in the world.

ROAR is one of four affiliated blocs that form the International Federation of Model Auto Racing (IFMAR). ROAR is one of four votes of approval of rules and regulations for IFMAR and is the only organization in the United States and Canada that can qualify drivers to participate in the IFMAR World Championships. ROAR publishes a yearly rule book that governs most forms of electric and fuel R/C racing in the U.S. and Canada and is widely used by tracks as the competitive racing standard. ROAR sanctions club racing, Region races and select events such as the Winternats, Great Lakes Challenge, Texas Biggie, etc. Each year ROAR holds a Championship to determine a National Champion for select classes. ROAR is a non-profit organization that provides insurance for racing participants, spectators and facilities. Clayton Young was elected ROAR president in 2023.

== Purpose ==
The governing body of ROAR is the executive committee. This committee consists of an elected president and vice president, and seven appointed members. The executive committee controls and manages the business affairs of ROAR, and ensures that the rules are up to date. The day-to-day business of the corporation is handled by the ROAR administrator, a non-voting member of the executive committee.

ROAR rules have been the guidelines for R/C car racing for over 50 years. They are designed to promote fair competition, safety, and define what equipment can be used in ROAR competition. ROAR does not manage races below national level (Level 5), but it does sanction races from the club level to multi-regional championships. All ROAR members in current and good standing are eligible to enter these races.

ROAR is the North American representative to the International Federation of Model Auto Racing (IFMAR). As such, ROAR is the only organization that is authorized to qualify and send drivers to the IFMAR World Championships. More ROAR members have been crowned World Champion than from any other organization.

The strength of ROAR is in the local clubs. It is here that the weekly competition takes place allowing drivers to perfect their skills, and prepare themselves to compete at the State, Region, and National level. ROAR has 200 clubs in the US and Canada. These clubs pay only $35 per year to be sanctioned, and to be covered by the member accident and liability insurance.

== Regions ==
ROAR is made up of 12 regions in the United States plus Canada. Each region has a director nominated and elected by the members in the region. This gives the members someone they can communicate with directly regarding issues in the region, and within ROAR.

Region 1: Connecticut – Maine – Massachusetts – New Hampshire – New York – Rhode Island – Vermont

Region 2: Delaware – Maryland – New Jersey – Pennsylvania – Washington DC – Virginia – West Virginia

Region 3: Alabama – Georgia – North Carolina – South Carolina – Tennessee

Region 4: Florida

Region 5: Illinois – Indiana – Kentucky – Michigan – Ohio – Wisconsin

Region 6: Arkansas – Louisiana – Mississippi

Region 7: Minnesota – North Dakota – South Dakota

Region 8: Iowa – Kansas – Missouri – Nebraska

Region 9: Oklahoma – Texas

Region 10: Arizona – Colorado – New Mexico – Utah – Wyoming

Region 11: Idaho – Montana – Oregon – Washington – Alaska

Region 12: California – Hawaii – Nevada

Region Canada: Canada

== ROAR Member IFMAR World Champions ==
2025 1/10 Electric 2wd Buggy Broc Champlin (United States) 2023 1/10 Electric 2wd Buggy Tater Sontag (United States)

2019 1/10 Electric 2wd Buggy Spencer Rivkin (United States)

2017 1/10 Electric 2wd Buggy Ryan Maifield (United States)

2017 1/10 Electric 4wd Buggy Ryan Maifield (United States)

2015 1/10 Electric 2wd Buggy Spencer Rivkin (United States)

2014 1/8 Nitro Buggy Ty Tessman (Canada)

2013 1/10 Electric 2wd Buggy Jared Tebo (United States)

2013 1/10 Electric 4wd Buggy Steven Hartson (United States)

2011 1/10 Electric 4wd Buggy Ryan Cavalieri (United States)

2011 1/10 Electric 2wd Buggy Ryan Cavalieri (United States)

2010 1/10 200mm IC Touring Ralph Burch (United States)

2010 1/8 IC Offroad Cody King (United States)

2007 1/10 Electric Offroad 4wd Jared Tebo (United States)

2006 1/8 IC Offroad Mark Pavidis (United States)

2005 1/10 Electric Offroad 4wd Ryan Cavalieri (United States)

2003 1/10 Electric Offroad 2wd Billy Easton (United States)

2003 1/10 Electric Offroad 4wd Ryan Cavalieri (United States)

2002 1/8 IC Offroad Greg Degani (United States)

2002 1/10 IC Track 235mm TC Brian Berry (United States)

2002 1/10 200mm IC Touring Mark Pavidis (United States)

2001 1/10 Electric Offroad 2wd Matt Francis (United States)

1997 1/10 Electric Offroad 2wd Brian Kinwald (United States)

1996 1/10 Electric Offroad 2wd Chris Bing (United States)

1996 1/10 Electric Track Pro 10 Mike Swauger (United States)

1995 1/10 Electric Offroad 2wd Matt Francis (United States)

1995 1/10 Electric Offroad 4wd Mark Pavidis (United States)

1993 1/10 Electric Offroad 2wd Brian Kinwald (United States)

1992 1/10 Electric Track Pro 10 Joel Johnson (United States)

1992 1/12 Electric Track Modified Tony Neisinger (United States)

1991 1/10 Electric Offroad 4wd Cliff Lett (United States)

1990 1/12 Electric Track Modified Chris Doseck (United States)

1987 1/8 Sport IC Track Pete Fusco (United States)

1987 1/10 Electric Offroad 2wd Joel Johnson (United States)

1986 1/12 Electric Track Modified Tony Neisinger (United States)

1985 1/10 Electric Offroad Modified Gil Losi Jr (United States)

1985 1/10 Electric Offroad Stock Jay Halsey (United States)

1984 1/12 Electric Track Modified Tony Neisinger (United States)

1984 1/12 Electric Track Stock Bud Bartos (United States)

1982 1/12 Electric Track Modified Arturo Carbonell (United States)

1982 1/12 Electric Track Stock Kent Clausen (United States)

1981 1/8 Sport IC Track Arturo Carbonell (United States)

1977 1/8 Sport IC Track Butch Kroells (United States)
