= Far East Model Car Association =

Radio-controlled car racing governing association in Asia & Australia

- Sport: Model car racing
- Category: Radio-controlled racing
- Jurisdiction: Asia and Australasia
- Abbreviation: FEMCA
- Affiliation: IFMAR
- President: Leonard Kee
- (founded): 1980

Official website
- www.femca-rc.com

Far East Model Car Association (FEMCA) is the governing body of radio-controlled car racing in Asia and Australasia. It is one of the four member blocs to be entitled to full voting rights within.

The organisation was founded in 1980, based in Hong Kong; after two false starts, it was re-established in 1985 when it hosted its first IFMAR race in Tokyo.

== Member countries ==
Nation	Organisation	Abbreviation	Native spelling	Foundation
Australia	Association of Australia Radio Controlled Model Car Club	AARCMCC		1979
Brunei				
China	Car Modelling Association of China	CMAC	中国车辆模型运动会	1995
Hong Kong	Hong Kong Model Car Association	HKMCA	香港模型車總會	
Kuwait	Radio Control Car Club of Kuwait	RCCCK		2005
Indonesia	Asosiasi Radio Kontrol Model Mobil Indonesia (Indonesian Radio Control Cars Association)	ARMI		1989
Japan	Japan Model Racing Car Association	JMRCA	日本モデルラジオコントロールカー協会	1974
Macau	Macau Lisboa R/C Model Club	M.L.M.C.	澳門葡京遙控賽車會	1996
Malaysia	Radio Control Auto Club	RCAC		
New Zealand	New Zealand Radio Car Association	NZRCA		
Philippines	Radio Control Modellers of the Philippines	RCMP		
Singapore	Singapore, Marine Parade Radio Control Modellers Club	SGMPRCMC		1981
South Korea	Korea Model Radio-Controlled Car Association	KMRCA	한국무선조종모형자동차협회	
Taiwan	Taiwan Radio Control Car Association	TRCCA	台灣遙控車模型協會	2011
Thailand	The Radio Control Car Association	RCCA		
Mongolia	Mongolian Radio Control Car Association	MRCCA	Монголын радио удирдлагатай авто загварын холбоо	2009
