= Serpent Model Racing Cars =

Company

- Type: Private
- Industry: Research and Development, Manufacturing, Sales and Promotion
- Founded: 1980
- Founder: Ron Ton; Pieter Bervoets
- Headquarters: Heemstede, North Holland, Netherlands
- Area served: Worldwide
- Key people: Michael Salven, Designer, driver & owner Ronald Baar, Commerce & co-owner , Xu Lau Logistics & co-owner , Lin Lau Production co-owner
- Products: Radio control model cars and components
- Revenue: US$1.5 million (2006)
- Owner: Michael Salven; Ronald Baar
- Number of employees: 100
- Parent: Serpent Ltd
- Website: http://www.serpent.com

Serpent Model Racing Cars B.V. (known commonly as Serpent, or alternatively Serpent Motorsport, Serpent MRC or Team Serpent) was a company from Heemstede, North Holland in the Netherlands, specializing in competition grade radio controlled cars, which has won numerous IFMAR and EFRA titles, plus several national titles. They are currently Chinese-owned and all products are made in China as of printing.

== History ==
The company was officially founded in 1980 as a brand name to Berton BV, named after a combination of its founders, Pieter Bervoets and Ron Ton, who were both radio controlled car racers. The pair built their first RC car in 1972, using a Kyosho Dash 1 chassis they modified. In 1977, the duo started to develop their first car under the Serpent name in 1977 and in 1979; both Bervoets and Ton had won separate EFRA 1:8 titles with their Mk. III Pro.

One of the highlights of its competition career occurred during the IFMAR World Championship for 1:10 Scale 235mm IC On-Road cars that took place in Apeldoorn, in the Netherlands, when the Impacts, its competition car for the category at the time, dominated the top 10 positions in both the Class 1 (sportscars) and Class 2 (touring cars).

The cars are nowadays developed using 3D CAD software such as Pro/Engineer and SolidWorks and are tested at the nearby race track in Heemstede. Other than competing in national and international championships, Serpent also has its own one-make series Serpent Nitro Tours and Serpent Series, which also has its own drivers' development program (Serpent Driver Development).

Ton sold off his shares to Bervoets in 1997. Bervoets in turn sold the company off to Ronald Baar and the works' championship-winning driver and designer, Michael Salven, in 2005 to allow him to concentrate on his other project that he had been running for years before, Virtual RC Racing, specializing in RC car racing simulation for home computers.

Following its takeover, there had been a few changes to the company, although the hissing snake symbol has never been changed since the beginning. The company's colour scheme has changed from magenta to the national Dutch colour scheme of orange and the logo has also been changed before the takeover. Another change to the company was when the popular and long running RC community orientated website myTSN was disbanded in favour of a more dedicated company site

In 2008, the Dutch company went into bankruptcy. The recently started Off-Road projects were paused and the brand and the stock was sold to new company VectorRC in Holland. Serpent Ltd in Hong Kong is now in charge of the production and distribution in Asia, Serpent Europe for Europe and Serpent America for the American region. Michael Salven and Ronald de Baar are owners of the Serpent brand and run a company (VectorRC BV) that takes care of the development and the marketing world-wide.

As of 2009, Serpent has won a total of seven world (IFMAR) and thirty three European titles (EFRA) together with five Japanese (JMRCA) and eight U.S. (ROAR) national titles as well as three Winternats.

In 2011, VectorRC teamed up with 2 new partners in China and created Serpent Ltd Hong Kong. By moving to China, Serpent has been able to develop the car line-up massively to over 30 different models, while maintaining high quality and performance standards.

== Product lines ==
Scale	Name	Terrain	2WD	4WD	Body width	EP/GP	Year of production	Notes
1:8	977 Viper	On-road		Checked		GP	2013	
1:10	747	On-road		Checked	200mm	GP	2012	
1:8	966 / E	On-road		Checked		EP	2009	
1:8	960-08	On-road		Checked		GP	2007	Updated version of 960
1:8	960-07	On-road		Checked		GP	2006	Updated version of 960
1:8	F180 RTR	On-road	Checked			GP	2006	Ready to run version of the F180
1:8	F180	On-road	Checked			GP	2006	First 1:8 true scale single seater car
1:8	960FD	On-road		Checked		GP	2006	Fabio Domanins edition, uprated
1:8	960	On-road		Checked		GP	2005	
1:8	950-R	On-road		Checked		GP	2003	
1:8	950	On-road		Checked		GP		Uprated version
1:8	Vector NT 2002	On-road		Checked		GP	2002–?	Uprated version
1:8	VETEQ 02	On-road		Checked		GP	2002–	Uprated version
1:8	Vector Spec 2000	On-road	Checked	Checked		GP	2000–?	
1:8	Vector Spec 98	On-road		Checked		GP	1998–?	
1:8	Vector	On-road		Checked		GP	–	
1:8	Excel MK II	On-road		Checked		GP	?–?	
1:8	Excel 9000	On-road				GP	?–?	
1:8	Sprint 6020	On-road				GP	?–?	
1:8	Sprint 6010	On-road				GP	?–?	
1:8	Sprint 6000	On-road				GP	1988–?	
1:8	Quattro	On-road	Checked	Checked		GP	1982 (1983 for 4WD) -	
1:8	Club Racer	On-road						
1:8	Quattro Compact	On-road	Checked			GP	April 1, 1986	SWB version of the Quattro. April Fool of French RC Car Magazine Auto8
1:8	Super Pro	On-road	Checked			GP	1981–?	
1:8	Competition MK III	On-road	Checked			GP	1979–?	
1:8	Nitro	Off-road		Checked		GP	2008?	Currently under development, working name
1:8	Spirit	Off-road		Checked		GP	?–1988	
1:8	Cobra	Off-road	Checked			GP	1983–?	
1:10	S500/Durango	Off-road		Checked		EP	2009	Sold and manufactured by Team Durango. Named as Team Durango DEX410.
1:10	Tenforce	on-road	Checked			EP	1980s–?	
1:10	835	On-road	Checked	Checked	235mm	GP	–	
1:10	Impact M2 WC/02	On-road	Checked	Checked	235mm	GP	2002–	
1:10	Impact M2	On-road	Checked	Checked	235mm	GP	–	
1:10	Impact Spec 2000	On-road	Checked	Checked	235mm	GP	2002–	
1:10	Impact 2	On-road	Checked	Checked	235mm	GP	2002–	
1:10	Impact Rally	On-road			235mm	GP	1995–	Body mounts modified to allow for touring car bodies
1:10	Impact	On-road	Checked		235mm	GP	1991–	
1:10	720 08	On-road			200mm	GP	2007–	
1:10	720 07	On-road			200mm	GP	2006–	
1:10	720	On-road			200mm	GP	–	
1:10	710 Team car	On-road			200mm	GP	–	
1:10	710 RTR	On-road			200mm	GP	–	Ready to run edition
1:10	710	On-road	Checked	Checked	200mm	GP	–	
1:10	705	On-road	Checked	Checked	200mm	GP	–	
1:10	Impulse PRO 4WD	On-road	Checked	Checked	200mm	GP	–	
1:10	Impulse PRO Carbon	On-road			200mm	GP	–	
1:10	S400	On-road			190mm	EP	–	
1:12	S120	On-road	Checked			EP	2008–	
1:24	S240	On-road	Checked			EP	2009–	
1:8	811 Cobra	Off-road		Checked		GP	2010	
1:8	811 Cobra-T	Off-road		Checked		GP	2010	Truggy version

1:8 811 Cobra Be Off-road

EP

2011 1:10 411 On-road

EP

2011
