= Novarossi =

Italian model parts manufacturer

Novarossi World s.r.l
- Company type: SRL Società a Responsabilità Limitata (Private limited company)
- Industry: Racing
- Founded: 1984
- Headquarters: Monticelli Brusati, Italy
- Key people: Cesare Rossi, Graziosa Barchi
- Products: Radio-controlled Cars
- Number of employees: 60
- Website: www.novarossi.it

Novarossi World, also known as Novarossi Nitro Micro Engines, was an Italian manufacturer of model engines and related items for radio-controlled models.

== History ==
Nova Rossi was founded in 1984 by Cesare Rossi and his wife Graziosa Barchi in the Italia region. Rossi started building model aircraft in the 1950s. Rossi started to successfully modify existing model engines, and won Italian and international competitions.

Throughout the 1960s, Rossi manufactured his own engines using engineering and mechanical skills learned from his father. With the aid of his brother, Cesare Rossi started a family business. Along with his wife Graziosa Barchi, and two sons Mario and Sergio Rossi, Cesare Rossi formed Nova Rossi.

In December 2005, Mario left Nova Rossi. He designed engines for RC Cars produced by Italian RC giants GRP Gandini and sold under various brands.

In December 2006, Nova Rossi changed their company name from Nova Rossi snc to Novarossi World s.r.l. Nova Rossi ceased manufacturing circa November 2019.

== Products ==
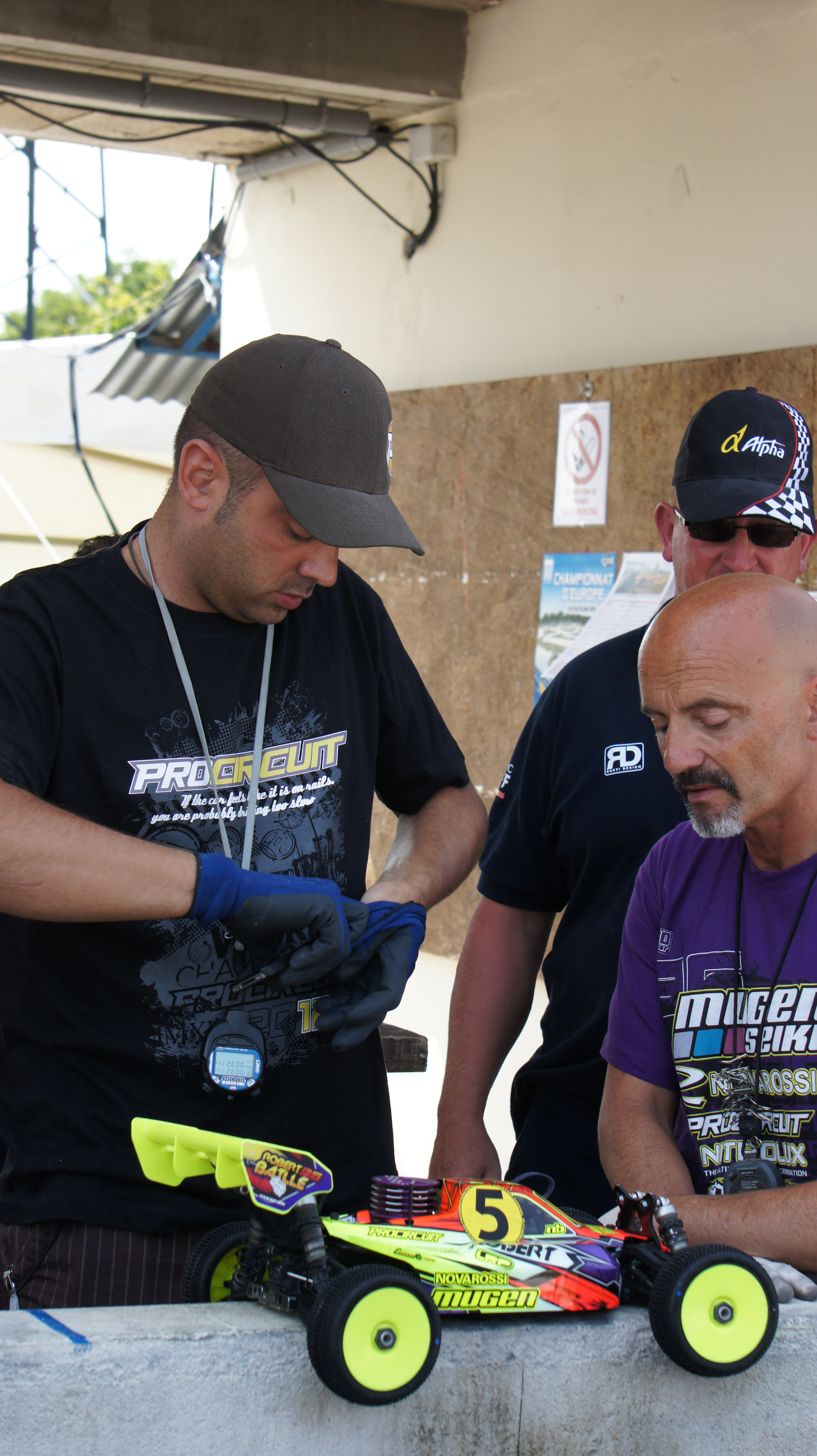
Robert Batlle's car with Novarossi engine.

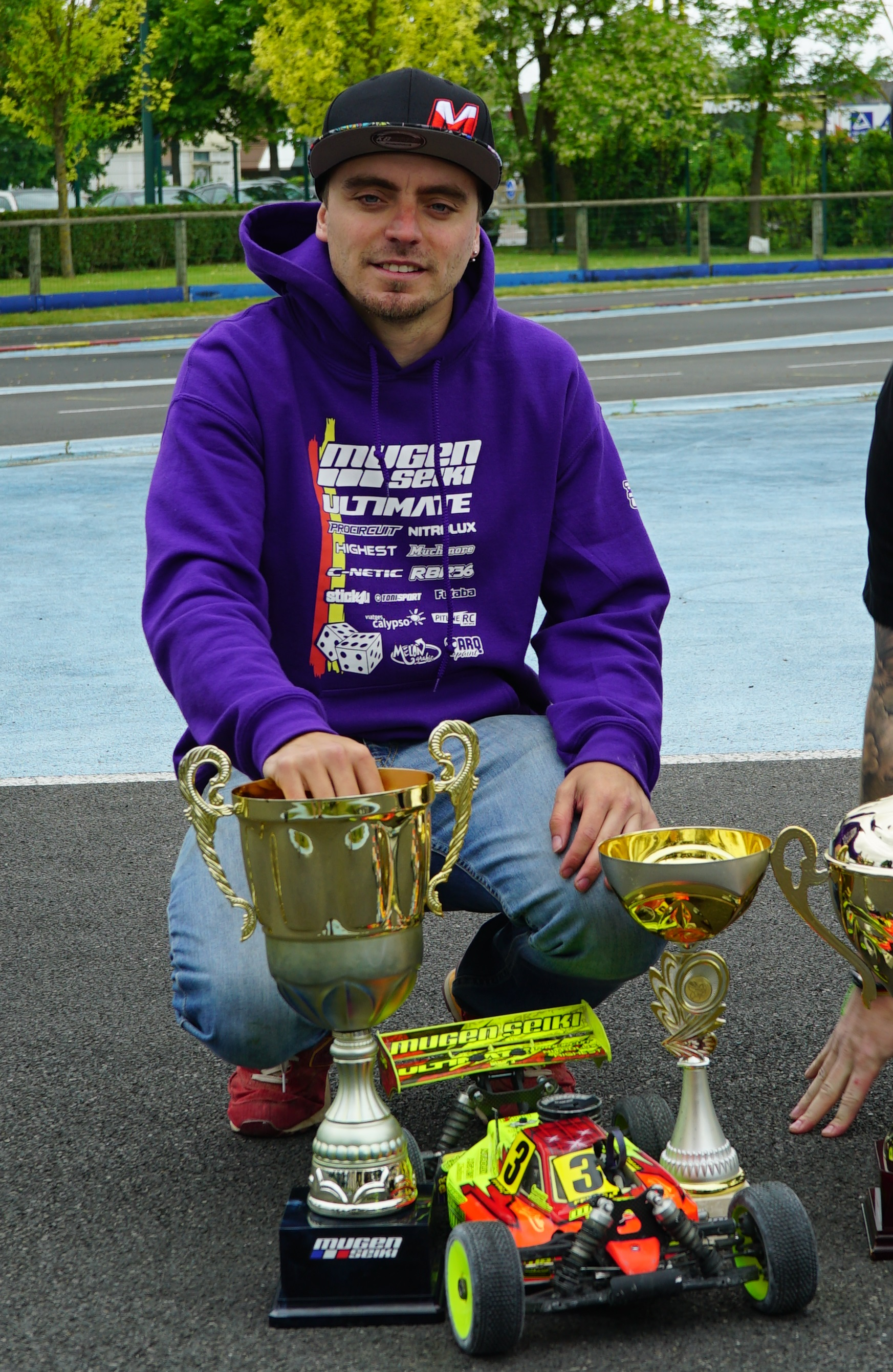
Robert Batlle, 2015

Nova Rossi produced engines, manifolds, tuned pipes, glow plugs and other accessories for all forms of radio-controlled models. Nova Rossi held a high share of sales with radio controlled cars, boats and aircraft. Many world championships were won in all of these classes, leading to the company slogan "World champion engines" often found on decals and apparel.

Nova Rossi produced 60,000 engines a year, and 300,000 glow plugs a year. Exports contribute 90% of Nova Rossi sales, showing global interest. Rossi expected a boom in model use through Italy to help improve the percentage of engines sold in Italy, which currently stands at 10%.

== Team Drivers ==
- Adam Drake - part of Team Novarossi and used a Novarossi engine to gain a victory in pro nitro buggy in the ROAR 2013 Nitro Offroad Nationals.
- Robert Batlle was part of Team Novarossi (Spain) - 2-time European Champion, 9-time Spanish Champion, 1 World Championship (2012, Argentina)
- Daniel Kleff (Germany - Novarossi Team Marine) - uses Novarossi engines in all Marine racing classes like FSR-V/H/O
- Alvin Crowder - races professionally in classes like nitro buggy and truggy.
- Eric Stausberg - 10 time American 1/8 scale truggy champion, 12-time Brazilian Champian, and 20-time Japanese Champian.
