= Mugen Seiki =

Japanese manufacturer

Mugen Seiki Co., Ltd.
- Formerly: Mugen Engineering Co., Ltd.
- Type: Private Company
- Founded: August 1, 1982 in Funabashi, Chiba, Japan
- Headquarters: Funabashi, Chiba, Japan
- Key people: Koji Sanada (president)
- Brands: Mugen Seiki, Ninja
- Total assets: 30 million yen
- Website: mugenseiki.com

Mugen Seiki Co., Ltd. (株式会社無限精機, Kabushiki Kaisha Mugen Seiki) is a Japanese manufacturer of high-end, premium radio-controlled cars based in Funabashi, Chiba, Japan. Mugen means unlimited, Seiki means machinery works. The company currently produces nitro and electric 1/8 scale buggies and truggies, 1/10 scale electric buggies, 1/8 scale nitro on-road racing cars, and nitro and electric 1/10 scale touring cars.

Founded in August 1982, Mugen Seiki initially specialized in 1/12 scale electric racing cars, developing the K2-X, K2-X '83, K2-X Spirit, K2-X Cosmic and SR Tempest, before expanding into 1/10 scale electric off-road racing with the Bulldog in 1985.

In 1986, Mugen Seiki entered the 1/8 scale nitro off-road buggy category with the Stream 21. The model line subsequently evolved through the Stream 21 Prospec and Stream 21 Prospec II, followed by the Sport, Super Sport and Super Sport-92. The Super Sport won the 1990 IFMAR 1/8 scale Off-Road World Championship with Koji Sanada. Later Mugen 1/8 scale buggies included the Athlete (1994) and Super Athlete (1996).

== MBX Series ==
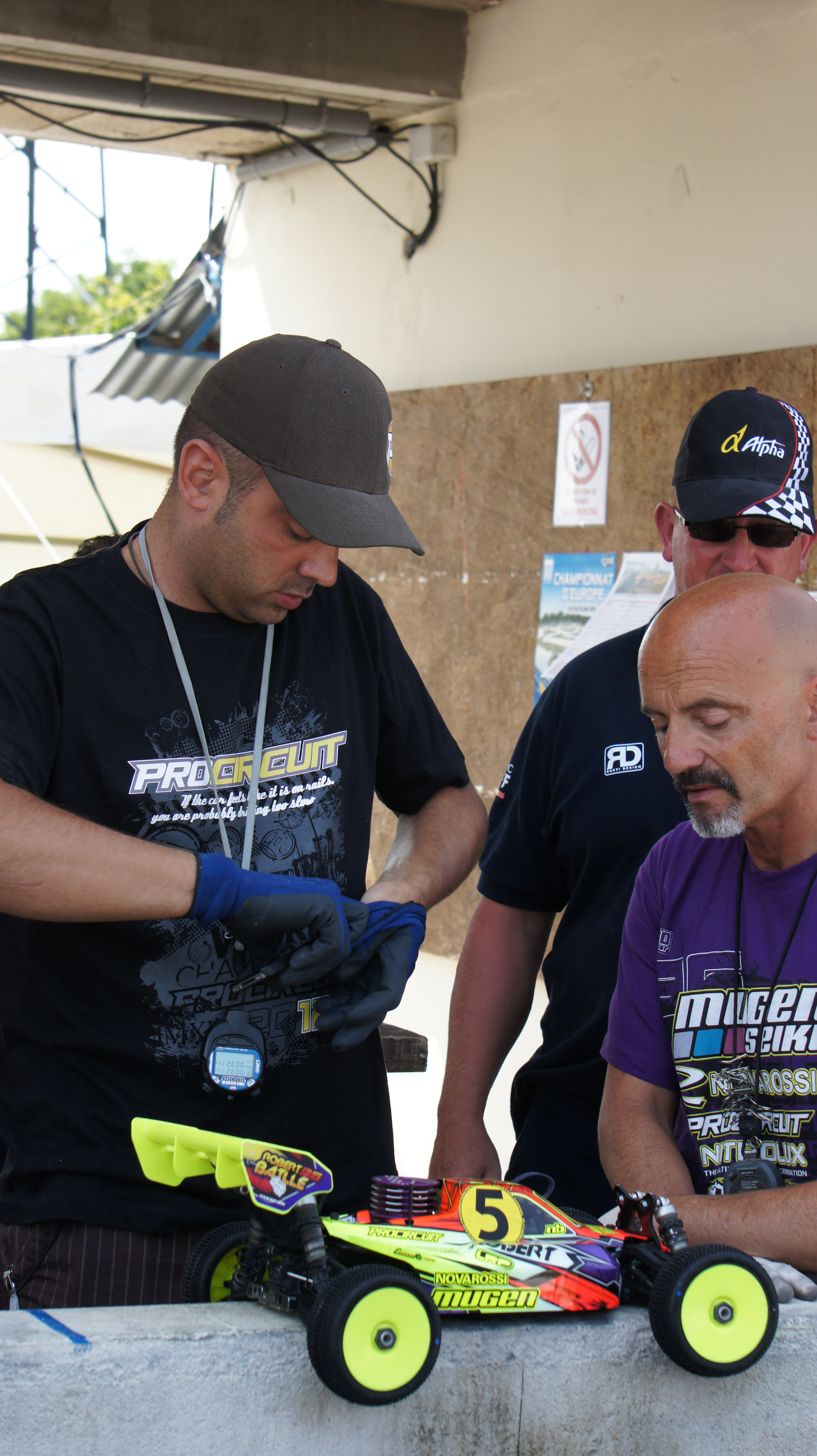
Robert Batlle's Mugen MBX-7, 2013 EFRA Championship.

MBX-4 Introduced in 1998, Mugen Seiki's 4th generation off-road vehicle competed at the 1999 EFRA 1/8 Off-Road European Championship in Spain. The car was called the MBX-4 and was an all new 1/8 buggy.

MBX-4XR WORKS The MBX-4XR WORKS was a special version of the MBX-4 and was announced on December 1, 2000. Mugen called it their "Expert Model."

MBX-4R The MBX-4R was a revised version of the MBX-4 and had updated suspension, an arms and steering.

MBX-5 & MBX-5T After a near 4 year production run of the MBX-4 (with updates in between), in mid-2003 the MBX-5 was launched. The car had won a world championship and was in production through 2006.

MBX-5 Pro Spec The MBX-5 Pro Spec was an updated version of the MBX-5. It featured thicker shock towers, aluminum rear uprights, aluminum steering arm, front and rear chassis braces and titanium turn buckles. This was the first Mugen buggy to feature chassis braces.

MBX-5R The MBX-5R was a newer and revised version of the MBX-5 Pro Spec. Compared to its predecessor (the MBX-5 Pro Spec) it featured longer travel suspension, a new one-piece engine mount and more steering travel.

MBX-6 & MBX-6T The MBX-6 and MBX-6T succeeded the MBX-5 and its truggy counterpart in 2008 and featured all new 15mm diameter big bore shocks and thicker shock towers. It was an all new car and was redone so heavily it was nearly unrecognizable compared to its MBX-5 predecessor.

MBX-6 ECO The MBX-6 ECO was an electric version of the Mugen MBX-6.

MBX-6R/ R ECO

MBX-6 USA Race Edition/USA Race Edition ECO The MBX-6 Race Editions distinguished themselves with silver colored graphite parts. The graphite parts used included the top steering plate, shock towers, and front steering fins.

MBX7T & MBX7TE (ECO) The truggy version of the MBX7 was launched in May 2014, to succeed the MBX6TR. It was the first time the truggy was available in electric form right out of the box. It featured a host of shock updates including longer travel suspension.

MBX-7R & MBX-7TR ECO

Current Models

MBX7R The 7R features a revised chassis and control arm setup along with new 16 mm big bore shocks. The rear shocks had a shorter stroke by 4 mm compared to its predecessor. MBX-7R The vehicle was released in December 2014.

MBX7TR & MBX7TR ECO. The MBX7TR along with the MBX7TR ECO were officially launched November 3, 2015 despite already have competing in a number of prior R/C car races. The new car features 16mm shocks which are up from the previous 15mm shocks used in the MBX7T, as well as a stiffer chassis and more precise steering with an improved servo saver.

MBX8

The "MBX8" was introduced on 11/12/2017 on their Facebook page.

MBX8 Worlds Edition

MBX8R
