= Jared Tebo =

American radio-controlled car racer

Jared Randall Tebo (born February 22, 1987) is an American radio-controlled car racer from Raymore, Missouri who specializes in off-road racing driving for Mayako.

A child motocross racer, Tebo took up radio-controlled racing at the age of 12 as an alternative to regular hospital visits due to motorcycle-related injuries. Since then, he has amassed a number of victories, most significantly 16 ROAR Nationals and two IFMAR Worlds. He with Ryan Cavalieri and Ryan Maifield are referred to by Neobuggy as the Original Three, a trio of American off-road racers born in 1986 to 1987, active from 2000 and frequently appeared together in the champion finals.

== Biography ==
As a child, Tebo competed in motocross from the age of six, hoping to compete in the AMA Supercross Championship. However, regular injuries caused him to lose interest. Wanting to compete in racing and attracted to the sound of glow plug engines, Tebo took up radio-controlled racing—he considered it to be "MX without the hospital visits." At that time, he had never owned a radio-controlled car.

Tebo's first car was a Team Associated RC10GT, a nitro powered stadium truck bought used by his father in March 1999. That November he competed in his first race, the Hot Rod Hobbies Shootout, where he attracted his first sponsor, O’Donnell Racing, a model engine manufacturer. Throughout his young career, he was mentored by Richard Saxton.

In 2000, after finishing fourth at the Dirt Nitro Challenge, Tebo signed up with Team Associated. His first 1/8 buggy race was the 2000 ROAR Nationals in Pleasant Hill, Missouri, where he finished second behind Brian Kinwald. After he earned a top qualifier (TQ) at the Silver State Nitro Challenge, he was signed up by Thunder Tiger, who later became a parent company to Team Associated, to drive 1:8 buggies whilst focusing with the latter for 1/10 off-roads, later departing Thunder Tiger for Kyosho. He won his first ROAR Nationals in 2004 in Las Vegas, Nevada when he won the 1/10 gas truck class.

In 2005, Tebo left Kyosho for O’Donnell Racing's newly introduced car operations while driving for Team Associated in 1/10. As a result, his performance in 1/8 off-road dwindled while he helped develop O’Donnell's Z01B buggy, but he managed to dominate the qualifying sessions at the 2008 ROAR Nationals, though he lacked he enjoyed with Thunder Tiger and Kyosho. By the time he was a senior in high school, Tebo had won three ROAR Nationals titles; following graduation, he turned professional.

At the end of 2008, following his first IFMAR Worlds win, Tebo rejoined Kyosho on a full contract. He also departed from O'Donnell with Reedy and LRP for Team Orion. Subsequently, he became the first driver to win both buggy and truck at the ROAR Fuel Off-Road Nationals in 2010 and helped Kyosho to become a major championship contender As a result of his success, Tebo has a Mini-Z miniature model based on his racing color scheme.

== Accomplishment ==
- Listed as one of the ten best racers of all time by Radio Control Car Action in 2015.

== Complete R/C racing summary ==
Bold on results indicates top qualifier.

=== IFMAR World Championship results ===
Year	Result	Class	Venue	Car	Motor	Source
2000	12	1:8 IC Off-Road	(United States) Silverton Hotel	Thunder Tiger		
2002	98	1:8 IC Off-Road	Green Mountain Raceway	Thunder Tiger EB4 S2 Pro	RB	
2003	28	1:10 Electric Off-Road 2WD	(United States) Minnreg RC Speedway			
2003	24	1:10 Electric Off-Road 4WD	(United States) Minnreg RC Speedway			
2004	18	1:8 IC Off-Road	(Sweden) Fururing Raceway	Kyosho	O'Donnell	
2005	5	1:10 Electric Off-Road 2WD	(Italy) AF Model Rings			
2005	15	1:10 Electric Off-Road 4WD	(Italy) AF Model Rings			
2007	2	1:10 Electric Off-Road 2WD	(Japan) Hakusan Arena	Associated	Checkpoint	
2007	1	1:10 Electric Off-Road 4WD	(Japan) Hakusan Arena	Associated	Checkpoint	
2008	4	1:8 IC Off-Road	(United States) The Farm 2 R/C Raceway	O'Donnell	OS	
2010	3	1:8 IC Off-Road	(Thailand) Pattaya RC Powerboat Track	Kyosho Inferno MP9 TKI2	Orion	
2011	3	1:10 Electric Off-Road 2WD	(Finland) Pitkämäki Race-Centre	Kyosho Ultima RB5	Orion	
2011	3	1:10 Electric Off-Road 4WD	(Finland) Pitkämäki Race-Centre	Kyosho Lazer ZX-5	Orion	
2012	22	1:8 IC Off-Road	(Argentina) Speed Paradise	Kyosho Inferno MP9 TKI3	Orion	
2013	1	1:10 Electric Off-Road 2WD	(United States) Silver Dollar RC Raceway	Kyosho Ultima RB6	Orion	
2013	44	1:10 Electric Off-Road 4WD	(United States) Silver Dollar RC Raceway	Kyosho Lazer ZX-5	Orion	
2014	6	1:8 IC Off-Road	(Italy) Pista Naxos World	Kyosho Inferno MP9 TKI3	Orion	
2015	2	1:10 Electric Off-Road 2WD	(Japan) Yatabe Arena	Kyosho Ultima RB6	Orion	
2015	10	1:10 Electric Off-Road 4WD	(Japan) Yatabe Arena	Kyosho Lazer ZX-6	Orion	
2016	4	1:8 IC Off-Road	(United States) RC Tracks of Las Vegas	Kyosho Inferno MP9 TKI4	Maxima Mx B4	
2017	4	1:10 Electric Off-Road 2WD	(China) Xiamen, Fujian	Kyosho	Orion	
2017	16	1:10 Electric Off-Road 4WD	(China) Xiamen, Fujian	Kyosho	Orion	
2019	11	1:10 Electric Off-Road 2WD	(Slovenia) Trencin	Tekno / Associated B6.1		
2019	13	1:10 Electric Off-Road 4WD	(Slovenia) Trencin	Tekno EB410		

=== ROAR National Championship results ===
Year	Result	Class	Venue	Car	Motor	Source	Report
2009	6	1:10 Racing Truck		Kyosho Ultima RT5	Orion		
2009	2	1:10 Electric Off-Road 2WD		Kyosho Ultima RB5	Orion		
2009	2	1:10 Electric Off-Road 4WD		Kyosho Lazer ZX-5	Orion		
2009	4	1:8 Fuel Off-Road Buggy	Leisure Hours R/C Raceway	Kyosho Inferno MP9 TKI2	Orion		
2009	2	1:8 Fuel Off-Road Truggy	Leisure Hours R/C Raceway	Kyosho Inferno ST-RR Evo	Orion		
2010	1	1:10 Open Truck		Kyosho Ultima RT5	Orion		
2010	2	1:10 Electric Off-Road 2WD		Kyosho Ultima RB5	Orion		
2010	3	1:10 Electric Off-Road 4WD		Kyosho Lazer ZX-5	Orion		
2010	1	1:8 Fuel Off-Road Buggy		Kyosho Inferno MP9 TKI2	Orion		
2010	1	1:8 Fuel Off-Road Truck		Kyosho Inferno ST-RR Evo	Orion		
2011	5	1:10 Electric Off-Road 2WD		Kyosho Ultima RB5	Orion		
2011	1	1:10 Racing Truck Modified		Kyosho Ultima RT5	Orion		
2011	1	1:10 Electric Off-Road 4WD		Kyosho Lazer ZX-5	Orion		
2011	2	1:10 Electric Off-Road SCT		Kyosho Ultima SC	Orion		
2011	7	1:8 Fuel Off-Road Buggy		Kyosho Inferno MP9 TKI2	Orion		
2011	2	1:8 Fuel Off-Road Truggy		Kyosho Inferno ST-RR Evo	Orion		
2011	1	1:8 Electric Off-Road Buggy		Kyosho Inferno MP9 TKI2	Orion		
2011	1	1:8 Electric Off-Road Truggy		Kyosho Inferno ST-RR	Orion		
2012	2	1:10 Electric Off-Road 2WD	West Coast R/C Raceway	Kyosho Ultima RB6	Orion		
2012	5	1:10 Racing Truck Modified	West Coast R/C Raceway	Kyosho Ultima RT5	Orion		
2012	2	1:10 Electric Off-Road 4WD	West Coast R/C Raceway	Kyosho Lazer ZX-5	Orion		
2012	3	1:8 Fuel Off-Road Buggy	LCRC Raceway	Kyosho Inferno MP9 TKI3	Orion		
2012	5	1:8 Fuel Off-Road Truggy	LCRC Raceway	Kyosho Inferno ST-RR Evo	Orion		
2013	1	1:10 Racing Truck Modified	Silver Dollar RC Raceway	Kyosho Ultima RT6	Orion		
2013	8	1:10 Electric Off-Road 2WD	Silver Dollar RC Raceway	Kyosho Ultima RB6	Orion		
2013	4	1:10 Electric Off-Road 4WD	Silver Dollar RC Raceway	Kyosho Lazer ZX-5	Orion		
2013	21	1:8 Fuel Off-Road Buggy	Gulf Coast R/C Raceway	Kyosho Inferno MP9 TKI3	Orion		
2013	12	1:8 Fuel Off-Road Truggy	Gulf Coast R/C Raceway	Kyosho Inferno ST-RR Evo	Orion		
2014	8	1:10 Electric Off-Road 2WD	Space Coast R/C Raceway	Kyosho Ultima RB6	Orion		
2014	4	1:10 Electric Off-Road 4WD	Space Coast R/C Raceway	Kyosho Lazer ZX-5	Orion		
2014	3	1:10 Electric Off-Road SCT	Space Coast R/C Raceway	Kyosho Ultima SC6	Orion		
2014	3	1:10 Electric Off-Road RT	Space Coast R/C Raceway	Kyosho Ultima RT6	Orion		
2014	8	1:8 Fuel Off-Road Buggy	Thornhill Racing Circuit	Kyosho Inferno MP9 TKI3	Orion		
2014	4	1:8 Fuel Off-Road Truggy	Thornhill Racing Circuit	Kyosho Inferno ST-RR Evo	Orion		
2014	2	1:8 Electric Off-Road Buggy	Gulf Coast R/C Raceway	Kyosho Inferno MP9 TKI3e	Orion		
2014	2	1:8 Electric Off-Road Truck	Gulf Coast R/C Raceway	Kyosho Inferno ST-RR	Orion		
2015	3	1:10 Electric Off-Road 2WD	Scottsdale RC Speedway	Kyosho Ultima RB6	Orion		
2015	4	1:10 Electric Off-Road 4WD	Scottsdale RC Speedway	Kyosho Lazer ZX-6	Orion		
2015	3	1:10 Electric Off-Road SCT	Scottsdale RC Speedway	Kyosho Ultima SC6	Orion		
2015	3	1:10 Electric Off-Road RT	Scottsdale RC Speedway	Kyosho Ultima RT6	Orion		
2015	3	1:8 Fuel Off-Road Buggy	Silver Dollar RC Raceway	Kyosho Inferno MP9 TKI3	MX		
2015	6	1:8 Fuel Off-Road Truggy	Silver Dollar RC Raceway	Kyosho Inferno ST-RR Evo 2	MX		
2015	7	1:8 Electric Off-Road Buggy	LCRC Raceway	Kyosho Inferno MP9 TKI3e	Orion		
2015	4	1:8 Electric Off-Road Truggy	LCRC Raceway	Kyosho Inferno ST-RR	Orion		
