= Kyosho Inferno =

Japanese radio controlled car

- Category: 1:8 4WD off-road buggy
- Constructor: Kyosho
- Predecessor: Kyosho Burns Series

Technical specifications
- Chassis: Aluminum
- Suspension (front): Independent wishbone
- Suspension (rear): Independent wishbone
- Engine: Two-stroke .21 "Nitro" (3.5cc) Mid mounted
- Transmission: Shaft driven four-wheel-drive 3x 3-gear differentials
- Fuel: Nitro
- Brakes: Double center disc brakes (for front and rear)
- Tyres: Rubber pin spike off-road tires with foam inserts

Competition history
- Debut: 1991

Designed by Yuichi Kanai the Kyosho Inferno is a 1/8 scale, four-wheel-drive, off-road competition buggy which was first released in late 1991 as the successor to the Kyosho Turbo Burns. As with the Burns series that came before it, each model has several versions with different factory specifications to suit specific budgets and skill levels. The first generation (MP3/MP4), now referred to as the "classic Inferno", was produced from late 1991 to the end of 1996 and won every IFMAR 1:8 IC Off-Road World Championship during its production run. With eight world titles under its belt, the Kyosho Inferno has been the most successful RC car in its scale and deserves the "fire"-themed brand name which has been in use since the release of the Kyosho Burns in 1988.

== General history ==
=== Background ===
The first generation of Infernos were produced from late 1991 to 1996 and shared only a few parts with its predecessor the Kyosho Turbo Burns. The Inferno was almost a complete redesign based on experiences in competition to increase performance, durability and ease of maintenance. Any similarity with the Burns series of cars was lost with the introduction of the Inferno MP5 in 1995 which introduced design characteristics which can still be found in the current MP10 more than 20 years later.

With the introduction of the Inferno, Kyosho also chose to sell partially assembled, entry-level kits and introduced their own line of budget GS engines.

As with the Burns predecessor, it was possible to start with the most affordable car and upgrade to a full-option, competition-ready vehicle when the skill and budget allowed. Alternatively one could also buy a competition car for far less than the cost of the individual optional parts.

It is often not known that the MP (Model Project) nomenclature, which is synonymous with Kyosho buggies from the MP5 onward, was already in use at Kyosho for the Burns series and first Inferno series of cars. Burns MP1, Turbo Burns MP2, Inferno MP3, Turbo Inferno MP4.

The versatility of this platform also enabled Kyosho to create 1:8 scale road and rally cars called the "Super Eight GP LANDMAX 4WD" and the Inferno ST (Stadium Truck) series. The Landmax were based on the original Inferno chassis until 2001, and then the Inferno MP7.5 chassis until 2008. The ST series is still going strong today although the components used bare little resemblance to the current Inferno buggy. The classic Inferno also had a smaller sibling in 1:10 scale call the Kyosho Inferno 10 which in turn lead to other "mini" versions of the Inferno in later years.

=== Timeline ===
Source:

== Classic Inferno (late 1991–1996) ==
=== Models and specifications ===
As with its predecessor, Kyosho released an intermediate-level car first which contained several performance parts. Not long after, this would be followed by a more affordable "DX" version and then a high performance "Turbo" version. The cars were typically released in kit form; however, Kyosho chose to release "DX" entry-level models partially assembled, making the car more attractive for customers who were completely new to the hobby. Depending on the country of release, the DX models would also include Kyosho's own GS engine, which was already set up and ready to run. This further reduced the complexity and made an otherwise highly technical hobby more approachable for a larger audience.

The success of this approach can be seen in the extent to which budget DX cars, that are available second hand, have been upgraded by their owners over time as they gained skill and confidence in the hobby. The Inferno's popularity also spawned a large number of 3rd party suppliers that provided additional performance accessories such as brake discs, carbon fiber plates, etc. Original Kyosho parts for these cars were still mostly given the "BS" and "BSW" nomenclature from the Burns series of cars and were also partially compatible with them. Later models received part numbers starting with IF and IFW.

The versatility of this platform also enabled Kyosho to create 1:8 scale road and rally cars called the "Super Eight GP LANDMAX 4WD" and the Inferno ST (Stadium Truck) series. The Landmax were based on the original Inferno chassis until 2001 and the original ST until 2005, nearly a decade after the production of the classic Inferno buggy ended.

After winning every world championship during its production run, the classic Inferno was phased out in favor of the MP5 in 1995.

==== Inferno 4WD, item no. 3281 (late 1991 – late 1993) ====
As the successor to the Turbo Burns, the classic Inferno not only had a couple of the same parts, but also had a similar body design and countersunk chassis plate. The similarities were largely superficial however with only the following parts being interchangeable with its predecessor.

- Differentials (however Burns had two bevel gears, classic and Turbo Inferno had four, see comparison table below)
- The inferno rear bulk head (though redesigned) is a direct fit for all burns series chassis.
- Wing and wing mount
- Shock absorbers
- Wishbones, hubs and axles
- Fuel tank
- Engine mount
- Most screws, nuts, washers, etc.

The car introduced many new design elements and notable improvements which would largely continue in subsequent Inferno models

- Single radio tray which held all electrical components and could be switched quickly as one unit when desired. (Burns radio tray did not hold the throttle servo)
- Stronger shock mounts with more mounting options
- Differentials with 4 bevel gears (Burns had 2)
- Two part diff housings for faster maintenance (Burns diff. housing consisted of 5 parts), also the inferno both bulkheads eliminates the top lexan covered opening for better protection against dirt and debri.
- New wheels and tires
  - Wide at front and back (Burns had narrow wheels and tires at front with the exception of the limited edition Turbo Burns SCC)
  - Micro spike tires instead of regular spikes
  - Lighter wheels with narrower spokes
- Separate front and rear disc brake (This was an optional part for the Burns towards the end of its production run and was supplied with the limited edition Turbo Burns SCC. The Inferno brake setup is not compatible with the Burns series.)

==== Inferno DX; item no. 3290h (1992–1994) ====
Just like the Burns series, the "DX" referred to the entry-level specification car. Unlike the Burns, however, this DX came partially assembled and some metal parts such as the exhaust and shock absorbers were replaced with plastic parts. An overview of the differences can be seen in the table below. The BS121 ring and pinion gears were made from a cheaper alloy material instead of the steel gears which were found in the Classic and Turbo versions of the car.

Unlike the Inferno 4WD und Turbo Inferno, the chassis of the car had additional holes to mount the Kyosho GS21-CR series engine. This particular engine is recognizable by its heat-sink which has vertical instead of the more common horizontal fins. An interesting cost saving measure was also the lack of countersunk holes in the chassis which would have required an extra production step. This had not been seen since the original Burns.

==== Turbo Inferno; item no. 31346 (1994–1995) ====
Continuing the model naming of the Burns series, the first series of Inferno cars also used the name "Turbo" to signify the car with the largest number of performance parts. Visually the Turbo Inferno could easily be identified by the anodized blue chassis plate and larger capacity, blue shock absorbers. Interestingly Kyosho did not include the blue anodized plates which were mounted in the steering and center differential of the Inferno DXII which was released the following year. The Turbo Inferno also included newly designed green wheels, a green spoiler, and unique "high grip" tires (part W5646H) which were supplied from the factory. Other than that the car was very similar in specification to the Inferno 4WD as can be seen in the comparison table below. The new, rigid plastic spoiler was the first departure from the Lexan versions which had been used until that point and would remain standard equipment on all future Inferno models.

==== Inferno DX II Ltd.; item no. 31552 (1995–1996) ====
The DXII used pieces from the initial classic Inferno 4WD, first Inferno DX and Turbo Burns. Most notable differences from the first DX were:

- The plastic shock absorbers were replaced with those from the classic Inferno 4WD (same type as Turbo Burns)
- The metal bearings were replaced with the ball bearings from the classic Inferno 4WD and Turbo Inferno
- The plastic muffler and rubber manifold were replaced with the Aluminum tuned muffler and manifold from the older Turbo Burns
- The Lexan wing was replaced with the hard plastic wing of the Turbo Inferno, however in the same yellow of the wheels instead of the Turbo's green. Although the part number of the wing stayed the same (BSW-71KY), Kyosho changed the color to neon yellow after the DXII was discontinued making the original yellow wing one of the hardest parts to find for collectors and restorers.

In addition the DXII had all blue anodized plates (with the exception of the chassis), and an additional hole in the chassis to accommodate a pull start. Some DXII kits also included the GS21-X engine. This engine had a new, larger head with horizontal fins to compensate for the overheating issues of the previous GS21-CR. The new head was available in plain aluminum (part 6520-31) and later with a blue anodized head (part 6520-31bl) to match the other blue plates on the car.

As there was no entry-level "Sports" version of the subsequent MP5 model the Inferno DXII remained Kyosho's entry-level car until 1996. Kyosho would not release another entry level 1/8 Buggy until the MP6 Sports in 1999.

==== Overview of main differences between classic Inferno models ====
	Part name	Turbo Inferno	Inferno 4WD	Inferno DX	Inferno DXII Limited
1	Differential ring gear	BS14*	BS14*	BS121	BS121
2	Differential pinion gear	BS14*	BS14*	BS121	BS121
3	Differential bevel gear (S)	BS37 (2 pairs per diff)	BS37 (2 pairs per diff)	BS37 (1 pair per diff)	BS37 (1 pair per diff)
4	Differential bevel gear (L)	BSW64	BS36	BS36	BS36
5	Tires	W5646H	BSW40	BSW40	BSW40
6	Chassis	BS108**** (blue anodized)	BS108	BS120	GT28
7	Ball bearings	Full	Full	Metal Bushings	Full
8	Wheels	BSW80KG	BS105	BS105	BS105
9	Wing	BSW71KG (Plastic)***	BSW5 (Lexan)	BSW5 (Lexan)	BSW71KY (Plastic)***
10	Shocks	BSW72 + BSW73*****	BSW27 + BSW28	2001 & 2002 plastic	BSW27 + BSW28
11	Front Axles	BS20 (Universal)**	BS20 (Universal)**	BS45 (Dog Bones)	BS45 (Dog Bones)
12	Center Diff	BSW34 (Adjustable)	BSW34 (Adjustable)	-	-
13	Spur gear	BS11	BS11	BS122	BS122
14	Stabilizer	BS63 + BSW79	BS63	-	-
15	Fuel Tank	BS65	BS65	BS28	BS65
16	Exhaust	-	-	BS123	BS64
17	Manifold	-	-	BS124	BS26
18	Engine	-	-	Kyosho GS21CR (optional)	Kyosho GS21X
19	Plate Set	BS115 + BS116	BS115 + BS116	BS115 + BS116	BS115 + BS116 (both blue anodized)

*Depending on the market and year of production the Turbo Infernos and Inferno 4WDs may also have been supplied with BSW-1 and BSW-2 hardened gears from the factory instead of the standard BS-14 set.

** Kyosho changed the part numbering of BS20 universal joint to IFW62 for later models

*** Kyosho later changed the part numbering of the BSW71 wing to IFW213. The color codes and colors for all wings are the same with the exception of IFW-213KY which is a neon yellow instead of the regular yellow of part BSW-71KY.

**** This chassis was not available as an official spare part. Instead BSW-60 Special Main Chassis was listed. This chassis was not blue anodized.

***** BSW-78 shock boots were included in the BSW-72 und BSW-73 sets. The part number for the boots changed to IFW-154 for later models.

=== Notable optional parts ===
Several of the optional parts which were available for the Turbo Burns could also be used on the first Inferno series, and vice versa. Most notable of which was the BSW-50 front carbon shock tower which was available an optional part for Turbo Burns, and was a part of the Turbo Burns SCC. Although this part was never listed as an official optional part for this car, it was actually used on the Inferno which won the 1992 IFMAR championship.

The most sought after optional parts are those which were unique to this first edition of Inferno, including the BSW-55 special diff housing which added rigidity, the BSW-86 special servo saver which offered more responsive and accurate steering, and the BSW-82 One Way Diff.

The later MP5 and MP6 had similar parts which, however, were not compatible with the classic Inferno.

One of the more common, and frequently discussed optional parts are the hardened BSW-1 and BSW-2 differential gears. It is also the only series of infernos that had three different specifications of differentials (depending on the country of sale). As can be seen in the table above the budget Inferno DX models used a cheaper alloy gear set (BS-121), while the mid-range Inferno 4WD cars came with the BS-14 from the Burns generation, and the Turbo Inferno was supplied with the BS-14 or the optional BSW-1 and BSW-2 set depending on the country of sale.

The Inferno chassis was also used for the Esprit, Landmax and Inferno ST series of cars which also had a few optional parts which were compatible with the Inferno, but were not included in its optional parts list. They also had GTW instead of BSW or IFW part numbers.

There were a few 3rd party manufacturers of aftermarket parts at the time making it possible to replace some standard parts for which Kyosho did not provide an option.

=== Box art and marketing material ===
The Inferno series continued the same style of box art and marketing material of its predecessor using mostly studio pictures of assembled and painted models. The only exception was the Turbo Inferno which came in a plane white and green box with a drawn outline of the car on the front. The Inferno and Inferno DX/DXII came with a box which had an integrated handle.

=== Collectibility and current popularity (1996–) ===
As with the Burns, the most collectible of this initial line-up is the Turbo version. This is in part due to its rarity, especially in good condition. Collectors specifically look for cars on which the blue anodized chassis has no damage, as well as unused tires. The blue anodized version of the chassis with part number BS-108 was not available as spare part which makes it particularly difficult to find new. The demand and value on the second hand market is however significantly lower than the Turbo Burns which preceded it, with near mint-condition cars with box often selling for less than 200 US Dollars at the time of writing in 2018. Collectors are also interested in the first DX in its original configuration as these were typically upgraded by their owners over time. Their original Kyosho engine, plastic shock absorbers and exhaust being discarded for higher performance parts.

Due to the low re-sale value, an abundance of spare parts, as well as reproduction parts such as new bodies and decals, the Inferno 4WD and Turbo Inferno are a good choice for entry and intermediate level RC buggy enthusiasts. Scans of the original instruction manuals for the various Inferno models are also available online.

In lieu of noise restrictions and the advances of battery and brushless technology, some cars are also being converted to an electric powertrain.

== Inferno MP5 & MP6 (1995–2002) ==
=== Models and specifications ===
The MP5 was the first of kyosho's 1:8 buggy line up to use the "MP" (Model Project), name in public and was largely a clean break from its predecessors as far as the "BS" and "BSW" parts compatibility is concerned. The few remaining parts which are still compatible with the previous Burns cars (MP1-MP2) include the 19mm hex wheels (which would later be changed to 17mm on the Inferno 7.5 as a new industry standard), and the fuel tank. A few other parts such as the wing design, shock absorbers and brake discs were carried across from the Turbo Inferno.

The MP5/MP6 also included some new design features which remain with the current Inferno line up.

- Upward angle (kick-up) at the front of chassis
- Splash resistant box for receiver and other electronics (instead of being mounted on the radio tray with the servos)

Like its predecessors, the MP3 and MP4 Infernos, the MP5 & MP6 won every IFMAR title during their production run, first in its standard form and later with the EVO editions. The MP5 and MP6 are visually nearly identical using the same body and wheels, however the MP6 had a longer chassis and wider rear track. Prior to the MP6 this relatively small change was also available on the MP5 in form of a long wheelbase conversion kit.

==== MP5, item no. 31551 (1995–1998) ====
As with the previous Burns and Inferno models Kyosho released an intermediate level car first. Unlike its predecessors, however, no entry level MP5 was produced.

The MP5 won the world championship in 1996, and was marketed as a competition buggy with many in-house options being made available within its first year of production.

==== MP5 With Picco P6B, item no. 31663P (1996) ====
A standard Inferno MP5 model packed from the factory with a Picco P6B engine, which also included a manifold and muffler. This version of the Inferno MP5 is identified by a sticker on the button right corner of the box.

==== MP5 EVO1, item no. 31664 (1996–1997) ====
With the "EVO" branding Kyosho distanced itself from the "Turbo" nomenclature used for the marketing of previously upgraded vehicles. It was released in 1996 and included a few parts from the options catalog. Unlike the standard MP5 which was supplied with the white wheels and wing that were featured on the box art, the EVO1 was supplied with a set of green wheels and a green wing. The car was sold for one year before being replaced by the EVO2.

==== MP5 EVO2, item no. 31781 (1997–1998) ====
The EVO2 was based closely on the car which won the 1996 World Championship Among various options the most noticeable difference to the previous MP5 models was the longer chassis and rear wishbones which were later used for the MP6. The chassis extension was also available as an upgrade package for previous MP5s. Unlike the previous 2 models, this car was not supplied with wheels or a wing.

==== MP6, item no. 31891 (1998–2002) ====
The MP6 was essentially a standard MP5 with the longer chassis and wishbones used for the MP5 EVOII, and stronger, blue anodized shock towers. In addition to the shock towers, all other Aluminum plates on the MP6 models were also anodized in blue. The unique feature of this "standard" MP6 is the gold-anodized chassis plate which is highly sought after in good condition.

A special edition was later released featuring the large capacity shocks of the MP6 International.

==== MP6 Sport, item no. 31951 (1999–2002) ====
Formerly referred to as the "DX" for the Burns and classic Inferno series of cars, the "Sport" was the entry-level car for the MP6 range. It had similar specification changes as the Inferno DXII and was also supplied with a Kyosho GS21 engine with a blue head to match the blue theme of the car (part 6520-31bl). Kyosho supplied the sport with a 3 mm chassis instead of the 2.5 mm of the standard MP6. This may lead one to believe that this was a stronger version to outlive the driving of a novice driver; however, the 2.5 mm was actually made from a harder alloy. As with the "DX" cars, it was possible to upgrade this car to a standard or international version but at a significantly greater cost than if one had bought the international kit directly.

==== MP6 International, item no. 31892 (1998–2002) ====
The term MP6 "International" was used instead of the "EVO" nomenclature used to describe performance versions of the MP5 series. The word "International" would not be used in this context again but would reappear from the MP9 TKI2 to TKI4, with the "TKI" standing for "Team Kyosho International". Unlike the MP5 EVO which only had a selection of optional parts, the MP6 featured almost every available option. As most of these options were already available for the MP5, the MP6 International could be released only one year after sales for the standard MP6 started.

==== Overview of main differences between MP5 & MP6 models ====
	Part name	MP5	MP5 EVO1	MP5 EVO2	MP6	MP6 Sport	MP6 International
1	Ball bearings	Full	Full	Full	Full	Full	Full
2	Brakes	IF-28	IF-28	IF-28	IFW-53	IF-28	IFW-53 (double disc)
3	Center Shaft front	IF-33 (dogbone)	IF-33 (dogbone)	IFW-12 (universal)	IF-33 (dogbone)	IF-33 (dogbone)	IFW-12 (universal)
4	Center Shaft rear	IF-33 (dogbone)	IF-33 (dogbone)	IFW-45 (universal)	IF-33 (dogbone)	IF-33 (dogbone)	IFW-45 (universal)
5	Chassis	IF-4 (2,5mm)	IF-4 (2,5mm)	IFW-41 (3mm counter sunk)	IF-44 (2,5mm, Gold)	IF-60 (3mm not counter sunk)	IFW-41 (3mm counter sunk)
6	Differential pinion gear	IF-21	IF-21	IF-21	IF-21	IF-61	IF-21
7	Differential ring gear	IF-20	IF-20	IF-20	IF-20	IF-61	IF-20
8	Engine	-	-	-	-	Kyosho GS21R (head 6520-31bl)	-
9	Engine Mounts	BS-25	BS-25		BS-25	BS-25	BSW-51
10	Manifold & Exhaust	-	-	-	-	BS-124 & GT-47	-
11	Front Axles	BS-20 (universal)*	BS-20 (universal)*	BS-20 (universal)*	BS-20 (universal)*	BS-45 (dogbone)	BS-20 (universal)*
12	Front Shock Stay	IF-3	IF-3	IFW-20	IF-47	IF-47	IFW-20
13	Front torque rod	-	-	IFW-06	-	IFW-43	IFW-43
14	Main Gear 46T	IF-22 (plastic)	IF-22 (plastic)	IFW-03 (steel)	IF-22 (plastic)	IF-22 (plastic)	IFW-03 (steel)
15	Manifold	-	-	-	-	BS124	-
16	Radio Posts	IF-17 (plastic)	IF-17 (plastic)	BSW-54 (aluminum, purple)	IF-17 (plastic)	IF-17 (plastic)	IFW-56 (aluminum, blue)
17	Rear Axles	BS-45 (dogbone)	BS-45 (dogbone)	IFW-42 (universal)	BS-45 (dogbone)	BS-45 (dogbone)	IFW-42 (universal)
18	Servo Saver	IF-18	IF-18	IFW-04 (ball bearing)	IF-18	IF-18	IFW-04 (ball bearing)
19	Shocks	BSW72 + BSW73***	BSW72 + BSW73***	IFW30 + IFW31	BSW72 + BSW73***	BSW72 + BSW73***	IFW30 + IFW31
20	Springs	incl. in BSW72 & 73	incl. in BSW72 & 73	incl. in BSW72 & 73	incl. in BSW72 & 73	incl. in BSW72 & 73	IFW-33W
21	Stabilizer Front	-	-	-	-	-	IFW-05
22	Stabilizer Rear	IF-32	IF-32	IF-32	IF-32	IF-32	IFW-21 (thicker)
23	Steering Plate	IF-19	IF-19	IFW-14 (blue)	IF-19	IFW-14 (blue)	IFW-14 (blue)
24	Steering Rod Set	IF-19	IF-19	IFW-02 (adjustable)	IF-19	IF-19	IFW-02 (adjustable)
25	Wheels	BSW-80W	BSW-80KG	None	BSW-80W	BSW-80BL	None
26	Wing	BSW-71W*	BSW-71KG*	None	BSW-71W*	BSW71-BL*	None
27	Wing Collar Stay	IF-25	IF-25	IFW-07 (blue)	IF-25	IF-25	IFW-07 (blue)

* Kyosho changed the part numbering of BS20 universal joint to IFW62 on later models

** Kyosho later changed the part numbering of the BSW71 wing to IFW213. The color codes and colors for all wings are the same with the exception of IFW-213KY which is a neon yellow instead of the regular yellow of part BSW-71KY.

*** BSW-78 shock boots were included in the BSW-72 und BSW-73 sets. The part number for the boots changed to IFW-154 for later models.

=== Notable optional parts ===
Most of the in-house optional parts were available on the MP6 international and were relatively common compared to the Burns and Classic Inferno options due to the volume of cars that Kyosho was producing and selling by this point. As with the Classic Inferno, the rarest part is the special aluminum center diff, which in this case had part number IFW-8. It was very similar to the plastic parts they replaced and much less complex that the BSW-55 aluminum differential of the classic Inferno. As it was not provided with the MP6 International, unlike almost all other optional parts, one could assume that Kyosho did not consider it a cost-effective or desirable item.

At this time there was an increasing number of manufacturers which provided aftermarket parts for RC cars. The Italian manufacturer Nuova Faor made a complete kit for the MP6, which replaced many of the plastic parts with machined aluminum parts, or replaced original aluminum parts with stronger versions. GPM was also a prominent supplier of aftermarket aluminum parts, as well as carbon graphite parts. As with many other suppliers in the 80s and early 90s, both Nuova Faor and GPM distinguished their aluminum parts by anodizing them purple.

Other suppliers at the time included Fioroni from Italy, Team Magic from Taiwan and RC Treff in Germany. Team Fiorini supplied competitive drivers with parts ranging from chassis plates to differentials for the MP5/MP6 and are still active today.

Selected 3rd party suppliers were also able to sell parts under the official Kyosho "Team" brand

=== Box art and marketing material ===
Unlike previous models, the cars on the front of the box of the MP5 and MP6 series were shown with bodies that were unpainted, clearly showing the internals of the car. Only a part of the front of the car had a semi transparent indication of the official paint scheme which could be found on the cars depicted on other parts of the box and in the marketing material.

Also, unlike the previous inferno models, the box art was largely the same regardless of the version of the car. The main box art showed the initial version of the car (standard MP5 or MP6), with different iterations being indicated by a label at the bottom right corner of the box.

An exception to this was the MP6 sport which had a clearly distinguishable box-art, and a car with a painted body.

To an extent, Kyosho used different colored wheels and wings to highlight the versions of the car on the main box-art however the color coding of these parts was sometimes not the same between the pictures seen in on the box and catalogs, and those which were available in the box.

Car	Main Box-Art	Main Catalog	Sold in Box
MP5	White	White	White
MP5 Evo1	White	White	Green
MP5 Evo2	White	White	None
MP6	Orange	White	None
MP6 Sport	Blue	Blue	Blue
MP6 Int.	Orange	Green (studio photo) & Orange (track photo)	None

=== Collectability and current popularity (2002–) ===
At the time of writing in 2018, the MP5 & MP6 are slowly attaining "classic" car status but are not yet particularly sought after on the second hand market. Because of this, good condition MP5 Evo2's or MP6 Internationals are still affordable and parts cars are readily available. This can enable starting hobbyist to have what was once world championship winning technology for a relatively low price. Optional parts are also more readily available and cheaper than those for its Burns and Inferno predecessors. As with the Burns and earlier Inferno models, third party suppliers provide aftermarket bodies and decals to help builders complete their restorations.

The MP6 Sports did not have a good reputation due to its relatively high price and low performance and is typically only sought after by enthusiasts looking to complete a collection if these are in good, original condition. As with the Inferno DX this is relatively rare as owners typically discarded the original, low cost parts in favour of performance pars as their skill increased.

== Inferno MP7.5 (2000–2004, 2009 for "Sports" models) ==
=== Models and specifications ===
After nearly 5 years of evolution rather than revolution with the MP5 and MP6 series of cars, Kyosho released the MP 7.5 which was redesigned from the ground up. The ".5" allegedly stands for the five consecutive IFMAR World Championships which had been won by the Inferno series at the time of its release.

==== MP7.5, item no. 31081 (2000–2004) ====
As with the other Infernos before it, this first release would provide a good intermediate level car, which could be upgraded to competition specifications relatively quickly. As with the later Kanai competition versions, the selection of the radio gear, motor and muffler were left to the buyer and were not included in the kit.

==== MP7.5 Sports v1, item no. 31192 (2001–2005), v2 item no. 31276 & 31277SG (2005–2009), v3 item no. 31278 (2009), v4 item no. 31279 (2009) ====
Following the tradition of previous generations of the Inferno series, the entry level "Sports" variant was released a year after the initial mid-range car. It was largely pre-built (often branded as a "Ready Set"), and was supplied with Kyosho's own GX-21 engine, a pre-painted body and the necessary remote control hardware. A notable exception was the 31277SG which was released with the higher performance GXR28SG engine.

It was set up to be easy to drive, with a wide power band and with a price tag of under 400 US Dollars it was aimed at casual and novice drivers. In line with previous DX and Sports version there are a significant number of differences in the type and quality of parts between this entry-level car, and the intermediate and competition variants. During its production cycle there were four different releases of the MP7.5 Sports which had slightly different specifications and different color body shells, wheels and wings.

As there was no entry-level model for the MP777 which succeeded the MP7.5 in 2005, Kyosho continued manufacturing the Sports versions of the MP 7.5 until 2009 at which point the MP777 was also discontinued.

==== MP7.5 Kanai 1, item no. 31191 (2000–2001) ====
This was the first ever car in the Kyosho line up to bare the name of its designer and factory race driver Yuichi Kanai. Yuichi Kanai developed all of the Kyosho 1/8 off-road buggies from the Kyosho Turbo Burns onward and was actively competing with the MP7.5 at the time. His name was used for the editions of the car that were released with a selection of the modifications he developed during the race seasons. Quad center disc brakes, special chassis and arms and a special rear wing were a few of the modifications. The Kanai editions were aimed to be competition ready cars for experienced, competitive drivers.

==== MP7.5 Kanai 2, item no. 31271 (2001–2002) ====
The Kanai 2 was an evolution of the Kanai 1 and focused on improved strength and steering geometry, and had double disk brakes.

==== MP7.5 Kanai 3, item no. 31273 (2002–2004) ====
This was the final version of the MP7.5 which incorporated the lessons learned from the preceding IFMAR championships and other races in which the MP7.5 competed. This car relied less on completely re-designed parts but instead on slight modifications to existing parts to improve the setup and reliability of the car. As with other performance variants, this model did not include items such as radio equipment, engine and mufflers as the ideal selection of these were highly dependent on both the track and the driver. In its original condition, the Kanai 3 can be recognized through its milled out chassis and titanium screws.

=== Collectibility and current popularity (2008–) ===
The MP7.5 has many years to go before it becomes a classic. Due to the volumes that Kyosho produced it and the fact that there were no special, limited editions of the car, they are also of limited interest to collectors. They do however provide an excellent platform for brushless electric conversion with Kyosho and many third-party suppliers providing conversion kits. They are one of the most common and most economical secondhand Kyosho 1/8 scale cars available on the second hand market. This makes the 7.5 an excellent car for beginners who are looking for relatively modern technology with an abundance of replacement and performance parts with the option to convert to brushless if desired.

== Inferno MP777 (2004–2008) ==
=== Models and specifications ===
The MP777 was released in 2004 to celebrate six successive wins at the IFMAR world championships. The fact that this car was more of an evolution than a revolution compared to its predecessor is reflected through the retention of the number 7 as the first character of the model number. The main focus of the MP777 was increased durability, better fine tuning options, and improved handling characteristics by moving the center of gravity.

==== MP777, item no. 31777 (2004–2008) ====
Among the main changes to the layout and construction of the MP777 there was a newly positioned center of gravity, as well as longer stroke for the rear suspension and more suspension pin angles. The durability was improved through additional components such as a muffler guard to prevent damage from lateral hits, guarded front hubs, and a newly designed "dish type" wheel to prevent dirt from getting in the axles on muddy tracks. Although these changes do not seem significant they provided the foundation to win the IFMAR championship title that followed in Indonesia in 2006.

==== MP777 SP 1, item no. 31778 (2004–2005) ====
The SP1 had a number of upgrades including a "traction control" front differential, a machined Duralumin engine mount, various blue anodized alloy parts and also a set of dampers which had a special coating on the inside to reduce friction.

==== MP777 SP 2, item no. 31779 & 31779S21 (2005–2006) ====
The SP2 had a couple of differences which were not apparent in the marketing material as they used pictures of the SP1. These included a wheelbase which had been lengthened by 4mm while the engine and R/C system had been moved 1.5mm to the rear to improve the stability and steering characteristics.

There was also a special edition with item number 31779S21 which included a Sirio S21BK EVO-2 engine, exhaust and manifold.

==== MP777 WC, item no. 31780 & 31780S21 (2006–2008) ====
The MP777 WC Team Edition Kit came with a S21BK EVO-2 STI Motor. The car was a replica of the one which won the 7th IFMAR world championship.

=== Collectability and current popularity (2008–) ===
The MP777 has many years to go before it becomes a classic, and because of the large number that were produced they are not very rare (with the exception of the "s21" model numbers with the Sirio engine). Therefore, most are of limited interest to collectors. They do, however, provide an excellent platform for brushless electric conversions with Kyosho, and many third-party suppliers provide conversion kits.

== Inferno MP9 (2008–2018) ==
=== Models and specifications ===
Similar to Microsoft skipping Windows 9, or Apple the iPhone 9, the omission of a Kyosho MP8 model indicated a revolution between the new MP9 and the previous MP7X models. Despite being redesigned from the ground up, the process apparently only required six months. A true indication of this revolution is the fact that the MP9 also embraced the new brushless electric motor technology from the factory in addition to the traditional two stroke engine. It shares almost no parts with the previous MP7X generation and from the second car onward the abbreviation "TKI" which stands for "Team Kyosho International" was added to the model name which had not been used before.

The MP9 has been less successful over its lifetime that the other Inferno models with only one win in 2010 by US driver Cody King, however there is also now considerably more competition as the cost of engineering and production of the vehicles has decreased over time. Nevertheless, it has won many other competitions and also earned a respectable second place at the IFMAR in 2016.

==== MP9, item no. 31782 & 31783 (2008–2010) ====
Although the internals of the car were new from the ground up, the body still harked back to the long swooping lines and curves of previous Inferno models. This would start to change from the TKI2 model onward. Different from the MP6 and MP7.5 generations, the budget conscious version of the MP9 no longer used the "Sports" branding. Instead it was simply known as number 31783. As with previous entry-level cars, the focus lay on keeping the overall characteristics and functionality of the car the same, with the main cost savings being in the materials and level of finish applied to the individual components. There were no "ready-set" pre-assembled cars in this first release.

==== MP9TKI2, item no. 31784, 31785, 31785CK, 31785JT, 31786 & 31787 (2010–2012) ====
With the ever-increasing speed of the cars, aerodynamics of the body started to play a more important role. This was also noticeable in the marketing material for later models. The "cabin" section of the body became more steeply racked and the back of the body was tapered upwards towards the spoiler. These changes started a shift away from the traditional drawn out, rounded lines that started with the Turbo Burns back in the late 1980s. The TKI2 started with a semi-assembled 31784 and a regular un-assembled 31785 kit.

Another first was the launch of limited-edition models named after Kyosho team drivers Cody King who won the IFMAR championship in 2010, and Jared Tebo who was the top qualifier. They had set numbers 31785CK and 31785JT respectively. The cars were released to celebrate the 8th IFMAR victory and featured the same engine as the championship winning car. Depending on the model, either King's or Tebo's signatures were engraved on the mufflers. As with the MP777 there was also a general World Championship "WC" car released which was not driver specific. It had item number 31786 followed by a semi-assembled "Spec A" version of the same car with item number 31787. This was the final release for the TKI2 range of cars.

==== MP9TKI3, item no. 31788 & 31888 & 31889T1 (2012–2016) ====
The TKI3 was a relatively minor evolution of the TKI2 focusing on strengthening certain components and re-positioning of some parts to further optimize the handling. The big change in the TKI3 line-up was the introduction of a ready-set car which was completely pre-assembled and featured metal parts that were stamped rather than machined to further reduce the cost. There were two model numbers, 31888 and 31889T1 which both had KE21R engines. Based on Kyosho's archive, the 31889T1 was roughly 25% cheaper than a regular, un-assembled version (approx. 60,000 vs. 80,000 Yen), yet included an engine and all necessary electronics. The car appeared to be less of a compromise compared to previous "Sports" iterations and offered a more competitive car for entry level enthusiast. Continuing the public's interest in "ready-set" cars, the MP9TKI3 was also released as a palm sized Mini-Z version which could be driven indoors and had item number 32081BB. This was the first indication of a true commercialization for the Kyosho Inferno brand.

==== MP9TKI4, item no. 33001, 33007, 30898, KYO33011B, and KY33013(2016–2018) ====
In 2016 the TKI4 earned a respectable second place at the IFMAR championships however the changes between the TKI3 and TKI4 were probably among the smallest between Kyosho releases. This can be seen from the parts available in the TKI3 upgrade pack provided by Kyosho. This car was also available as a partially assembled "Spec-A" variant with number 33007. The innovation which might have been missing between the TKI3 and TKI4 was definitely compensated for by the MP9e brushless Kit with number 30898. This was the first electric 1:8 off-road buggy that Kyosho had released from the factory and showed the company embracing an entirely different type of technology which not only brings drastic changes to the way a car handles and performs but also requires entirely new parts and a different layout to maintain similar handling characteristics.

In 2018 an important milestone was reached as the TKI4 welcomed the tenth anniversary of the MP9 series of cars (number KYO33011B). Ten years is the longest production run of any of the 1/8 Kyosho off-road models. This edition also includes many optional parts in the standard kit and is the highest-spec. TKI4. This car was also available as a partially assembled "Spec-A" variant with number 33013. Even more impressive is that in 2018 one also celebrated 30 years since the release of the MP1 Burns series which essentially set the foundation for all the 1:8 Kyosho Buggys that followed.

== Inferno MP10 (2019–) ==
=== Models and specifications ===
==== MP10, item no. 33015 and 33020 (2019–2021) ====
In January 2019 Kyosho released the new MP10, marking an end to the ten-year production cycle of the MP9. The new car was redesigned from the ground up and Kyosho goes to great lengths to show this by illustrating the main changes to the MP9 in detail on the MP10's webpage. This car was also available as a partially assembled "Spec-A" variant with number 33020.

== External references and citations ==
=== External references ===
- Vintage Kyosho Thread at rcmagvintage.com
- Kyosho Thread on Retromodelisme
- Kyosho Thread on Tamiyaclub.com
- Vintage Kyosho Buggy Thread on RCUniverse.com
- Kyosho Thread on RC-Forum.de
