= 2019 IFMAR 1:10 Electric Off-Road World Championships =

Radio-controlled model car race

Coordinates: 48.8892054°N 18.0608655°E

Event Information
- Event Title: 2019 IFMAR 1:10 Electric Off-Road World Championships
- Dates run: 14–21 January 2020

Club Information
- Venue: Hudy Arena
- Location: Trencín,
- Host country: Slovakia

Vehicle Specification
- Class: 1:10 Electric Offroad Buggy

2wd Title
- First: (United States) Spencer Rivkin; Team Associated
- Second: (Italy) Davide Ongaro; Team Associated
- Third: (Japan) Yusuke Sugiura; Yokomo

4WD Title
- First: (Portugal) Bruno Coelho; XRAY
- Second: (United States) Dakotah Phend; TLR
- Third: (Poland) Michal Orlowski; Schumacher

The 2019 IFMAR 1:10 Electric Off-Road World Championships was the eighteenth edition of the IFMAR 1:10 Electric Off-Road World Championship was held in Slovakia at the Hudy Arena which is effectively the test track for Xray. However the two wheel drive class was won by Spencer Rivkin racing an Team Associated RC10B6.1D bringing the manufacturers tally of IFMAR World Championships to thirty. In the 4WD class Bruno Coelho from Portugal took the victory with the XRAY.

== Results ==
Note: A-mains only.

=== 2WD Results ===
Pos.	Driver	Car	Motor	Qual.	A1					A2					A3					Total
Pos.	Driver	Car	Motor	Qual.	Pos.	Time	Laps	FL	Pt.	Pos.	Time	Laps	FL	Pt.	Pos.	Time	Laps	FL	Pt.	Total	Lap	Time
1	(United States) Spencer Rivkin	Associated RC10B6.1D	HobbyWing XeRun V10 G3	1	2	9	5:19.696	34.734	2	1	9	5:22.366	35.394	1	1	9	5:20.784	35.175	1	4	18	10:43.15
2	(Italy) Davide Ongaro	Associated RC10B6.1D	LRP X22	2	1	9	5:19.096	35.119	1	2	9	5:22.859	35.394	2	2	9	5:21.952	35.309	2	5	18	10:44.811
3	(Japan) Yusuke Sugiura	Yokomo YZ-2 DTM3	Muchmore Fleta ZX V2	3	4	9	5:24.477	35.749	4	5	9	5:26.257	35.463	5	3	9	5:24.292	35.503	3	12	18	10:48.769
4	(Portugal) Bruno Coelho	Xray XB2	HobbyWing XeRun V10 G3	4	3	9	5:24.444	35.090	3	6	9	5:29.136	35.414	6	4	9	5:24.867	35.727	4	13	18	10:49.311
5	(United States) Ryan Maifield	Yokomo YZ-2 DTM3	Orion Vortex Ultimate	6	6	9	5:28.687	36.001	6	3	9	5:25.140	35.617	3	7	9	5:28.021	34.852	7	16	18	10:53.827
6	(Finland) Joona Haatanen	Associated RC10B6.1D	Reedy Sonic M3	10	7	9	5:30.232	35.672	7	4	9	5:26.257	35.308	4	9	9	5:32.863	35.929	9	20	18	10:56.489
7	(Czech Republic) Martin Bayer	Xray XB2	Muchmore Fleta ZX V2	5	5	9	5:28.016	35.977	5	7	9	5:29.526	35.547	7	6	9	5:27.328	35.600	6	18	18	10:55.344
8	(Canada) Ty Tessmann	Xray XB2	HobbyWing XeRun V10 G3	7	9	9	5:32.096	35.394	9	8	9	5:32.712	35.688	8	5	9	5:25.506	35.217	5	22	18	10:58.218
9	(United States) Ryan Cavalieri	Yokomo YZ-2 DTM3	Orion Vortex Ultimate	8	8	9	5:30.003	36.088	8	10	9	5:36.888	35.971	10	8	9	5:28.733	35.806	8	26	18	10:58.736
10	(United Kingdom) Neil Cragg	Associated RC10B6.1D	Reedy Sonic M3	9	10	9	5:34.489	35.948	10	9	9	5:34.35	35.819	9						29	18	11:08.839

			Qual.	Finals				Ref.
Pos.	Driver	Car	Qual.	Pos.	Laps	Time	FL	Ref.
11	Jared Tebo (USA)	Teckno / Associated B6.1	11	B-1	9	5:23.991	35.269
12	Daniel Kobbevik Jnr. (NOR)		13	B-2	9	5:27.372	35.114
13	David Ronnefalk (SWE)		17	B-3	9	5:27.818	35.223
14	Dustin Evans (USA)		12	B-4	9	5:29.858	35.873
15	Jörn Neumann (GER)		18	B-5	9	5:31.233	35.759
16	Dakotah Phend (USA)		19	B-6	9	5:32.104	35.372
17	Lee Martin (GBR)		20	B-7	9	5:32.459	35.209
18	Kohta Akimoto (JPN)		14	B-8	9	5:36.37	36.052
19	Michal Orlowski (POL)		16	B-9	8	5:01.7	36.035
20	Broc Champlin (USA)		15	B-10	8	5:04.222	36.14
21	Jamiel Gabrielsson Jnr. (FIN)		21	C-1	9	5:27.968	36
22	JP Richards (USA)		23	C-2	9	5:29.86	35.837
23	Marco Baruffolo (ITA)		24	C-3	9	5:31.489	35.56
24	Hubert Hönigl (AUT)		22	C-4	9	5:31.814	36.146
25	Clément Boda Jnr. (FRA)		30	C-5	9	5:32.613	35.969
26	Elliot Boots (GBR)		25	C-6	9	5:33.48	36.014
27	Tom Rinderknecht (USA)		26	C-7	9	5:36.556	36.367
28	Kaito Kodera (JPN)		29	C-8	8	5:04.734	35.849
29	Riccardo Berton (ITA)		27	C-9	8	5:06.88	35.912
30	Lucas Grainer (AUT)		28	C-10	8	5:07.509	36.785
31	Wesley Van Helmond (NED)		40	D-1	9	5:35.958	35.958
32	Alex Kosciuszek (USA)		37	D-2	9	5:35.114	36.114
33	Max Götzl (CZE)		35	D-3	8	5:00.31	36.31
34	Jean-Pierrick Sartel (FRA)		31	D-4	8	5:02.935	35.935
35	Joel Valander (FIN)		32	D-5	8	5:04.415	36.415
36	Renaud Savoya (FRA)		33	D-6	8	5:05.438	36.438
37	Kouki Kato (JPN)		36	D-7	8	5:07.441	36.441
38	CJ Jelin (USA)		34	D-8	8	5:11.471	36.471
39	Aydin Horne (USA)		39	D-9	8	5:14.991	35.991
40	Shinnosuke Adachi (JPN)		38	D-10	DNS	:00	0
41	Tommy Hinz (USA)		42	E-1	8	5:00.682	36.666
42	Alexander Landen Jnr. (SWE)		41	E-2	8	5:01.355	36.782
43	Jesper Rasmussen (DNK)		46	E-3	8	5:03.025	37.123
44	Pekko Ivonen (FIN)		45	E-4	8	5:05.111	36.849
45	Carlos Pineda Vidal (ESP)		49	E-5	8	5:06.869	36.802
46	Micha Widmaier (GER)		43	E-6	8	5:07.285	35.814
47	Yui Kaino (JPN)		44	E-7	8	5:09.638	36.579
48	Zacarias Villalba (ESP)		50	E-8	8	5:17.453	37.184
49	João Figueiredo (POR)		47	E-9	8	5:21.415	37.096
50	Paul Crompton (GBR)		48	E-10	8	5:21.835	37.069
51	Thomas Anger (FRA)		52	F-1	9	5:34.774	36.56
52	Nana Kaiho (JPN)		53	F-2	9	5:36.452	36.547
53	Jessica Palsson (SWE)		58	F-3	8	5:03.673	36.979
54	Mikko Luopajärvi (FIN)		55	F-4	8	5:04.931	37
55	Aleš Bidovský (CZE)		60	5	8	5:07.525	36.887
56	Luca Rau (GER)		56	6	8	5:09.245	37.186
57	Nico Schmid (CHE)		59	7	8	5:09.504	36.907
58	Frederik Hovgaard (DNK)		57	8	8	5:10.854	37.124
59	Mathieux Chaffardon (FRA)		54	9	8	5:13.251	36.185
60	Karri Salmela (FIN)		51	F-10	5	3:23.126	37.388
61	Konsta Saarinen (FIN)		61	G-1	9	5:35.881	36.885
62	Jordan Isergin (AUS)		64	G-2	8	5:00.82	37.017
63	Aaron Muenster (GER)		65	G-3	8	5:02.077	36.753
64	Bartolomiej Zambrzycki (POL)		66	G-4	8	5:06.034	37.485
65	Lachlan Munday Jnr. (AUS)		69	G-5	8	5:09.804	37.168
66	Tommy Hall Jnr. (GBR)		62	G-6	8	5:12.142	37.562
67	Ari Bakla (AUS)		68	G-7	8	5:12.277	37.647
68	Lachlan Donnelly (USA)		63	G-8	8	5:14.599	37.578
69	William Venables (GBR)		70	G-9	8	5:16.325	37.574
70	Raymond Munday (AUS)		67	G-10	8	5:18.685	37.873
71	Moritz Lautenbach (GER)		73	H-1	8	5:06.981	37.747
72	Thibault Jacqueloot (BEL)		76	H-2	8	5:09.887	37.702
73	Jens Becker (GER)		74	H-3	8	5:12.845	37.491
74	Zsolt Bajusz Jnr. (HUN)		79	H-4	8	5:16.947	37.493
75	Yolan De Weerd (BEL)		78	H-5	8	5:22.449	37.631
76	Matuš Benetin Jnr. (SVK)		72	H-6	8	5:26.923	37.341
77	Kay Frehner Jnr. (CHE)		71	H-7	8	5:30.499	37.919
78	Jamie Hall (GBR)		75	H-8	8	5:32.355	37.737
79	Tristan Hackl (AUT)		77	H-9	8	5:34.865	37.303
80	Fabian Luca Widmer (CHE)		80	H-10	1	0:52.95	0
81	Florian Schmid (CHE)		82	I-1	8	5:07.566	36.91
82	Marek Schiller (CZE)		84	I-2	8	5:08.932	37.81
83	Otto Ausfelt (SWE)		86	I-3	8	5:13.208	37.201
84	Jarno Siltanen (FIN)		89	I-4	8	5:15.038	37.168
85	Christian Wukonig (AUT)		81	I-5	8	5:19.063	38.604
86	Mitchell Pratt (AUS)		90	I-6	8	5:19.441	39.007
87	Andrew Selvaggi (AUS)		85	I-7	8	5:27.56	37.302
88	Nigel Van Katwijk (NED)		83	I-8	8	5:30.634	38.836
89	Tyler Liddle Jnr. (GBR)		87	I-9	7	5:09.426	38.82
90	Toni Niinivirta (FIN)		88	I-10	DNS	:00	0
91	Philip Jeisy (CHE)		92	J-1	8	5:20.17	37.958
92	Juraj Hudy (SVK)		95	J-2	8	5:21.85	38.189
93	Richard Schantel (AUT)		96	J-3	8	5:21.471	38.582
94	Georg Kotzinger (AUT)		99	J-4	8	5:24.599	38.873
95	Thorbjørn Doler (NOR)		100	J-5	8	5:26.011	38.688
96	William White (IRL)		98	J-6	8	5:26.58	38.916
97	Øystein Doler (NOR)		94	J-7	8	5:28.603	38.587
98	Jodi Long (USA)		97	J-8	8	5:35.409	38.51
99	Markus Andreasson (SWE)		93	J-9	8	5:36.459	38.299
100	Bartolomiej Kramža Jnr. (POL)		91	J-10	DNS	:00	0
101	Oskari Maki (FIN)		105	K-1	8	5:15.036	38.116
102	Mark Smith (GBR)		101	K-2	8	5:15.426	38.581
103	Sven Rudig (AUT)		103	K-3	8	5:17.539	38.647
104	Jon Philpott (AUS)		108	K-4	8	5:30.348	39.663
105	Fernando Cabrera Salado (ESP)		110	K-5	8	5:30.606	38.791
106	Kai Jeager (AUS)		104	K-6	8	5:35.758	38.972
107	Balint Rajki (HUN)		106	K-7	8	5:36.501	38.401
108	Roman Pavlus (SVK)		109	K-8	8	5:37.389	39.051
109	Radim Kolek Jnr. (CZE)		102	K-9	8	5:39.848	38.562
110	Colin Whelan (IRL)		107	K-10	DNS
111	Rene Levetzow (AUT)		112	L-1	8	5:25.777	39.389
112	Koen Midelkoop (NED)		115	L-2	8	5:33.465	40.291
113	Nick Floudas (GRC)		117	L-3	8	5:33.482	40.186
114	Daniel Schweizer (HUN)		111	L-4	8	5:38.459	40.245
115	Damien O'Dea (AUS)		114	L-5	8	5:38.953	39.364
116	Luis Godinho (POR)		113	L-6	7	5:02.991	40.412
117	Miloš Švihran (SVK)		119	L-7	7	5:14.467	43.101
118	Kai Koivuranta (SWE)		118	L-8	7	5:15.944	41.707
119	Miklos Szabados (GBR)		121	L-9	7	5:16.696	42.398
120	Paul Parks (CAN)		116	L-10	7	5:35.835	40.948
121	Matěj Vích Jnr. (CZE)		120	L-11	7	5:42.285	44.108

=== 4WD Results ===
Pos.	Driver	Car	Motor	Qual.	A1					A2					A3					Total
Pos.	Driver	Car	Motor		Pos.	Time	Laps	FL	Pt.	Pos.	Time	Laps	FL	Pt.	Pos.	Time	Laps	FL	Pt.	Total	Lap	Time
1	(Portugal) Bruno Coelho	Xray XB4	HobbyWing XeRun V10 G3	1	2	9	5:04.431	33.673	2	A2-1	9	5:03.555	33.271	1	A3-1	9	5:05.226	33	1	2	18	10:07.781
2	(United States) Dakotah Phend	TLR 22X-4	Trinity Monster	2	1	9	5:03.84	33.728	1	A2-2	9	5:04.791	32.766	2	A3-3	9	5:08.487	32.681	3	3	18	10:08.631
3	(Poland) Michal Orlowski	Schumacher CAT L1 Pro	LRP X22	3	3	9	5:07.28	34.068	3	A2-3	9	5:07.18	33.488	3	A3-5	9	5:12.697	33.085	5	6	18	10:14.46
4	(Norway) Daniel Kobbevik	Xray XB4	Muchmore Fleta ZX V2	4	4	9	5:07.684	33.917	4	A2-4	9	5:08.494	33.192	4	A3-9	9	5:20.489	33.489	9	8	18	10:16.178
5	(Canada) Ty Tessmann	Xray XB4	HobbyWing XeRun V10 G3	9	6	9	5:11.408	34.322	6	A2-7	9	5:13.907	33.651	7	A3-4	9	5:10.369	33.369	4	10	18	10:21.574
6	(Italy) Marco Baruffolo	Xray XB4	Muchmore Fleta ZX V2	7	5	9	5:09.143	34.099	5	A2-5	9	5:11.343	33.404	5	A3-10	9	5:22.467	33.467	10	10	18	10:20.486
7	(Sweden) David Ronnefalk	HB D418	Orion Vortex Ultimate	5	9	9	5:15.093	34.811	9	A2-9	9	5:15.197	33.084	9	A3-2	9	5:04.125	22.125	2	11	18	10:19.711
8	(Japan) Yusuke Sugiura	Yokomo YZ-4 SF2	Muchmore Fleta ZX V2	10	7	9	5:14.106	34.738	7	A2-6	9	5:13.558	33.724	6	A3-6	9	5:13.44	33.449	6	12	18	10:26.697
9	(United States) Ryan Maifield	Yokomo YZ-4 SF2	Orion Vortex Ultimate	6	10	9	5:16.438	35.133	10	A2-8	9	5:14.432	33.818	8	A3-7	9	5:15.156	33.563	7	15	18	10:29.588
10	(United States) Spencer Rivkin	Associated RC10B74	HobbyWing XeRun V10 G3	8	8	9	5:14.48	34.671	8	A2-10	9	5:17.076	33.235	10	A3-8	9	5:20.691	33.351	8	16	18	10:35.171

			Qual.	Finals					Ref.
Pos.	Driver	Car	Qual.	Pos.	Laps	Time	FL		Ref.
11	Broc CHAMPLIN (USA)		11	B-1	9	5:06.047	33.859	1
12	Joona HAATANEN (FIN)		13	B-2	9	5:08.494	34.274	2
13	Jared Tebo (USA)	Teckno	12	B-3	9	5:08.541	34.291	3
14	Lee MARTIN (GBR)		16	B-4	9	5:11.006	34.478	4
15	Davide ONGARO (ITA)		14	B-5	9	5:11.742	34.596	5
16	Neil CRAGG (GBR)		18	B-6	9	5:13.715	34.701	6
17	Martin BAYER (CZE)		19	B-7	9	5:21.849	35.647	7
18	Elliot BOOTS (GBR)		15	B-8	9	5:22.599	35.784	8
19	Jörn NEUMANN (DEU)		20	B-9	9	5:27.01	36.498	9
20	Dustin EVANS (USA)		17	B-10	9	5:29.219	36.481	10
21	Alex KOSCIUSZEK (USA)		23	C-1	9	5:13.415	34.637	1
22	Ryan CAVALIERI (USA)		21	C-2	9	5:15.436	34.713	2
23	Paul CROMPTON (GBR)		25	C-3	9	5:17.484	35.132	3
24	Max GÖTZL (CZE)		30	C-4	9	5:19.082	35.063	4
25	JP RICHARDS (USA)		29	C-5	9	5:19.555	35.203	5
26	Hubert HÖNIGL (AUT)		28	C-6	9	5:21.019	35.512	6
27	Aydin HORNE (USA)		22	C-7	9	5:24.059	36.089	7
28	Jean-Pierrick SARTEL (FRA)		27	C-8	9	5:24.65	35.958	8
29	Shinnosuke ADACHI (JPN)		26	C-9	9	5:25.827	36.144	9
30	Jamiel GABRIELSSON Jnr. (FIN)		24	C-10	9	5:26.873	36.407	10
31	Kaito KODERA (JPN)		32	D-1	9	5:14.546	34.962	1
32	Wesley VAN HELMOND (NED)		31	D-2	9	5:17.453	35.234	2
33	Joel VALANDER (FIN)		33	D-3	9	5:17.935	35.078	3
34	Aaron MUENSTER (DEU)		36	D-4	9	5:18.092	35.165	4
35	Tommy HINZ (USA)		39	D-5	9	5:21.125	35.417	5
36	Pekko IVONEN (FIN)		35	D-6	9	5:22.386	35.578	6
37	Kouki jun. KATO (JPN)		38	D-7	9	5:24.327	35.911	7
38	Matuš jun. BENETIN (SVK)		40	D-8	9	5:26.219	36.117	8
39	Tom RINDERKNECHT (USA)		37	D-9	9	5:29.355	36.147	9
40	Renaud SAVOYA (FRA)		34	D-10	6	3:38.429	36.435	10
41	CJ JELIN Jnr. (USA)		43	E-1	9	5:10.598	34.501	1
42	Riccardo BERTON (ITA)		41	E-2	9	5:14.328	34.908	2
43	Kohta AKIMOTO (JPN)		45	E-3	9	5:14.407	35.024	3
44	Ari BAKLA (AUS)		42	E-4	9	5:17.327	35.114	4
45	Jessica PALSSON (SWE)		49	E-5	9	5:20.511	35.432	5
46	Clément BODA Jnr. (FRA)		44	E-6	9	5:22.547	35.751	6
47	João FIGUEIREDO (POR)		47	E-7	9	5:24.608	35.815	7
48	Micha WIDMAIER (DEU)		48	E-8	9	5:27.098	36.356	8
49	Tommy jun. HALL HALL (GBR)		50	E-9	9	5:30.062	36.383	9
50	Bartolomiej ZAMBRZYCKI (POL)		46	E-10	9	5:31.001	36.6	10
51	Florian SCHMID (CHE)		52	F-1	9	5:17.881	35.275	1
52	Frederik HOVGAARD (DNK)		51	F-2	9	5:19.783	35.279	2
53	Konsta SAARINEN (FIN)		58	F-3	9	5:22.062	35.265	3
54	Yui KAINO Jnr. (JPN)		55	F-4	9	5:22.319	35.144	4
55	Karri SALMELA (FIN)		53	F-5	9	5:23.228	35.645	5
56	Jesper RASMUSSEN (DNK)		56	F-6	9	5:30.041	36.271	6
57	Thomas ANGER (FRA)		54	F-7	9	5:31.102	36.54	7
58	Nico SCHMID (CHE)		60	F-8	9	5:31.64	36.64	8
59	Mathieux CHAFFARDON (FRA)		59	F-9	6	3:51.274	36.603	9
60	Alexander LANDEN Jnr. (SWE)		57	F-10	1	0:41.081	0	10
61	Jordan ISERGIN Jnr. (AUS)		61	G-1	9	5:16.754	35.065	1
62	Carlos PINEDA VIDAL (ESP)		63	G-2	9	5:20.449	35.567	2
63	Mikko LUOPAJÄRVI (FIN)		69	G-3	9	5:26.82	36.132	3
64	Bartolomiej jun. KRAMŽA Jnr. (POL)		62	G-4	9	5:30.43	36.907	4
65	Yolan DE WEERD (BEL)		66	G-5	9	5:31.496	36.606	5
66	Jonathan YEUNG (HKG)		70	G-6	9	5:31.847	36.893	6
67	Zacarias VILLALBA (ESP)		68	G-7	9	5:32.282	36814	7
68	Luca RAU (DEU)		67	G-8	9	5:32.405	36.424	8
69	Moritz LAUTENBACH (DEU)		65	G-9	9	5:34.604	36.554	9
70	Aleš BIDOVSKÝ (CZE)		64	G-10	8	5:11.385	39.216	10
71	Jamie HALL (GBR)		71	H-1	9	5:21.551	35.763	1
72	Raymond MUNDAY (AUS)		74	H-2	9	5:26.921	36.255	2
73	Philip JEISY (CHE)		76	H-3	9	5:30.757	36.564	3
74	Kay FREHNER Jnr. (CHE)		72	H-4	9	5:31.723	36.291	4
75	Lachlan MUNDAY Jnr. (AUS)		73	H-5	9	5:35.443	37.115	5
76	Nana KAIHO (JPN)		80	H-6	8	5:04.703	37.178	6
77	Lachlan DONNELLY Jnr. (AUS)		75	H-7	8	5:07.398	38.032	7
78	Zsolt BAJUSZ Jnr. (HUN)		79	H-8	8	5:09.038	38.515	8
79	Jens BECKER (DEU)		78	H-9	8	5:17.253	39.694	9
80	Nigel VAN KATWIJK (NED)		77	H-10	3	2:04.718	41.777	10
81	Jarno SILTANEN (FIN)		83	I-1	9	5:29.47	36.573	1
82	Fabian Luca WIDMER (CHE)		84	I-2	9	5:33.334	36.994	2
83	Marek SCHILLER (CZE)		81	I-3	9	5:35.921	37.442	3
84	Otto AUSFELT (SWE)		87	I-4	8	5:00.098	37.085	4
85	Mitchell PRATT (AUS)		88	I-5	8	5:01.195	36.305	5
86	Tyler LIDDLE Jnr. (GBR)		85	I-6	8	5:02.837	37.458	6
87	Oskari MAKI (FIN)		89	I-7	8	5:05.834	37.763	7
88	Andrew SELVAGGI (AUS)		90	I-8	8	5:11.331	38.356	8
89	William VENABLES (GBR)		82	I-9	8	5:14.049	38.61	9
90	Juraj HUDY (SVK)		86	I-10	4	2:33.704	38.005	10
91	William WHITE (IRL)		91	J-1	9	5:34.865	37.306	1
92	Radim KOLEK Jnr. (CZE)		92	J-2	9	5:38.185	37.639	2
93	Jody LONG (SGP)		97	J-3	8	5:04.172	37.877	3
94	Christian WUKONIG (AUT)		93	J-4	8	5:04.459	37.387	4
95	Øystein DOLER (NOR)		95	J-5	8	5:11.991	39.3	5
96	Colin WHELAN (IRL)		100	J-6	8	5:17.689	39.579	6
97	Thibault JACQUELOOT (BEL)		94	J-7	8	5:19.563	39.467	7
98	Georg KOTZINGER (AUT)		99	J-8	8	5:21.985	40.01	8
99	Štefan LUTKA (SVK)		98	J-9	8	5:26.883	40.339	9
100	Toni NIINIVIRTA (FIN)		96	J-10	4	2:29.619	37.278	10
101	Thorbjørn DOLER (NOR)		102	K-1	8	5:01.815	37.72	1
102	Mark SMITH (GBR)		103	K-2	8	5:08.531	38.585	2
103	Nick FLOUDAS (GRC)		104	K-3	8	5:12.198	38.427	3
104	Markus ANDREASSON (SWE)		101	K-4	8	5:12.39	38.765	4
105	Daniel SCHWEIZER (HUN)		109	K-5	8	5:15.481	38.939	5
106	Sven RUDIG (AUT)		106	K-6	8	5:16.964	38.78	6
107	Jon PHILPOTT (AUS)		108	K-7	8	5:18.261	38.416	7
108	Carson YEUNG (HKG)		107	K-8	8	5:19.256	39.57	8
109	Rene LEVETZOW (AUT)		110	K-9	8	5:22.969	40.496	9
110	Kai JEAGER (AUS)		105	K-10	1	0:41.477	0	10
111	Fernando CABRERA SALADO (ESP)		111	L-1	8	5:15.021	39.454	1
112	Roman PAVLUS (SVK)		112	L-2	8	5:16.313	39.533	2
113	Richard SCHANTEL (AUT)		114	L-3	8	5:17.691	39.478	3
114	Luis GODINHO (POR)		118	L-4	8	5:28.17	40.255	4
115	Zsolt st. BAJUSZ (HUN)		115	L-5	8	5:29.458	41.266	5
116	Igor LIPTÁK (SVK)		116	L-6	8	5:29.749	40.984	6
117	Damien O'DEA (AUS)		113	L-7	8	5:31.627	40.8	7
118	Koen MIDELKOOP (NED)		119	L-8	7	4:43.579	39.774	8
119	Paul PARKS (CAN)		117	L-9	7	5:02.126	42.626	9
120	Kai KOIVURANTA (SWE)		120	L-10	7	5:06.687	42.999	10
121	Miklos SZABADOS (GBR)		123	M-1	8	5:31.092	41.195	1
122	Christoph HOFER (AUT)		122	M-2	8	5:38.957	42.258	2
123	Matěj VÍCH Jnr. (CZE)		124	M-3	7	5:10.123	43.665	3
124	Miloš ŠVIHRAN (SVK)		121	M-4	0	0:00	0	4
