= Associated RC100 =

Remote Controlled Vehicle by Associated Electrics

RC100 was the second remote control vehicle released by Associated Electrics. It rose to quick dominance in the industry, sweeping the first 5 places at the IFMAR World Championships in 1977. The RC100 went on to win the ROAR Nationals in 1976 and the first IFMAR World Championships in 1977, driven by Associated drivers Butch Kroells 1st, Bill Jianis 2nd and Gene Husting took 3rd place.
