= DronesVision =

Taiwanese arms manufacturer

- Industry: Technology
- Founded: 2015
- Headquarters: Keelung, Taiwan
- Products: combat drones and anti-drone systems
- Number of employees: 19

DronesVision is a Taiwanese arms manufacturer, specializing in militarized unmanned aerial vehicles and anti-UAV technologies.

== History ==
The company was established in 2010. In 2014, they launched their first product, the SKYNET anti-drone electronic warfare system. In 2018, they launched the AR-1, a drone capable of carrying and using AR-style rifles. In 2022, they launched the Revolver 860, a drone capable of delivering 8 60mm mortar rounds.

== Customers ==
=== Taiwan ===
DronesVision has supplied anti-drone systems to the Taiwanese military.

=== Ukraine ===
In 2022, Revolver 860 drones sold to Poland were transferred to Ukraine for use during the 2022 Russian invasion of Ukraine.

== See also ==
- Aerovironment
- Defense industry of Taiwan
- Thunder Tiger
