= Kyosho Burns =

- Category: 1:8 4WD off-road buggy
- Constructor: Kyosho
- Predecessor: Kyosho Presto Integra
- Successor: Kyosho Inferno

Technical specifications
- Chassis: Aluminum
- Suspension (front): Independent wishbone
- Suspension (rear): Independent wishbone
- Engine: Two stroke .21 "Nitro" (3.5cc) Mid mounted
- Transmission: Shaft driven four-wheel-drive 3x 3-gear differentials
- Fuel: Nitro
- Brakes: Single center disc brake, optional front disc brake
- Tyres: Rubber pin spike off-road tires

Competition history
- Debut: 1987

Kyosho Burns is a 1/8 scale four-wheel-drive, two-stroke, off-road competition buggy which was released as a kit from 1987 up until 1992, with five different specifications to meet different price points. It had a robust platform which was easily upgradable with good performance even at an entry level. The success of the platform also led to it being used for Kyosho's 1:8 scale monster truck, the USA-1 Nitro Crusher.

Kyosho designer and driver Yuichi Kanai started his involvement with the Turbo Burns and carried several parts and many design elements over to the classic Inferno series of cars which were produced from 1991 to 1996. The classic Inferno would later go on to win every IFMAR championship during its production run.

== General history ==
=== Background ===
Although Kyosho was already popular in the 1/8-scale off-road market with cars such as the Vanning, Landjump and Presto (from the Integra line-up), they were relatively complex vehicles made largely from metal, with limited upgrade and customization options. These original buggies took their design cues from real life vehicles which had a traditional ladder frame or cage construction and often had rear-mounted engines. The Burns addressed this by taking advantage of new technologies and design elements.

- The introduction of more cheap yet durable and reliable injection molded parts, combined with metal elements where necessary for strength or adjust-ability
- Aluminium pan chassis instead of a cage improving access for assembly and maintenance while maintaining rigidity. Also provided more flexibility for different motors, exhausts and electronics
- Where applicable, shaft-driven 4WD system with adjustable center differential instead of previous chain-driven configurations
- Four-wheel fully independent wishbone type suspension
- Mid-mounted engine for better weight distribution and handling
- Single radio tray which held all electrical components and could be switched as one unit when desired
- Lexan bodies which were easy to produce, reduced weight, provided better protection for internal components, came in various designs to fit the same chassis, and allowed more creative freedom for paint and customization.
- Released with five different factory specifications plus additional optional parts making it possible to start with the most affordable car and upgrade to a full option, competition ready vehicle when the skill and budget allowed. Alternatively one could buy a fully specced. car for less than the cost of the individual parts.

With the exception of the large variety of standard models and the single radio tray, these designs can still be seen in the current Kyosho 1/8 scale buggies. The single radio tray was changed to a separate servo tray and water resistant battery and receiver box from the Inferno MP5 onward.

It is often not realized that the "MP" nomenclature which is synonymous with Kyosho buggies from MP5 onward, was already in use at Kyosho for the Burns Series. Burns MP1, Turbo Burns MP2, Inferno MP3, Turbo Inferno MP4.

=== Timeline ===
Source:

== Burns MP 1 (1987–1992) ==
=== Models & Specifications ===
As would be seen in future Kyosho releases, an intermediate-level car was released first containing some performance parts. For both the Burns and classic Inferno series a more affordable "DX" version would be released only a year after the intermediate level vehicle. The differences between the Burns models were however more substantial than the later classic Infernos. All of the cars were released in kit form, with no pre-assembled parts.

The cars popularity also spawned a larger number of third-party suppliers which provided additional performance accessories such as gears, brake discs, aluminum mounts and wishbones, stiffer chassis plates, etc. One of the more popular suppliers was Duratrax.

==== Burns 4WD, item no. 3096 (1987–1988) ====
The Burns 4WD would eventually become the intermediate-level car, with the later DX and Turbo variants made for the entry and competition markets respectively. Unlike the latter Inferno models this car was discontinued after the launch of these other variants which makes this car relatively rare.

This car was revolutionary at the time for its use of the new design elements mentioned in the "Background" section above and differences between the final version of the car and the box art make it clear that this car was still being tweaked shortly before it came to market. These differences are discussed in a dedicated section below.

==== Burns DX 4WD item no. 3099 (1989–1991) ====
Parts which were not included or changed from the standard Burns 4WD were:

- From black to orange o-rings in shocks (change)
- No bulkhead seals (omission)
- From ball bearings to metal bushings (change)
- From universal swing shaft to dog bones in the front (change)

==== Burns DX 2WD item no. 3098 (1989–1992) ====
In addition to the changes of the Burns DX 4WD, the DX 2WD included additional changes to reduce the sales price:

- All internals removed from center differential (omission)
- No front center shaft (omission)
- No front differential, front axles or bearings in the front differential housing (omission)
- Front hubs which were specific to only this model (change)

=== Notable optional parts ===
The Burns series parts number started with BS for the standard parts, and BSW for the optional parts. It was possible to upgrade the entry level Burns DX 2WD to Turbo Burns specification by purchasing the required "BS" and "BSW" numbered parts. The options list of the original Burns manual is quite sparse as these parts were released over a period of several years and the manual was not updated to reflect what had become available. There are, however, few notable parts for the original Burns with most being available on eBay for reasonable prices.

=== Box art and marketing material ===
Unlike Tamiya and many other manufacturers which had drawn box art allowing for some artistic interpretation, Kyosho used studio pictures of the completed models. The only notable exceptions to this were the Kyosho Prestige, which was a rebranded car from HoBao, and the later Kyosho Turbo Inferno.

The main picture on the front of the box showed the car from a forward, 45° angle. The sides of the box featured a top down and close-up shots without the lexan body, and a picture of the car being driven. The main box art for the DX 2WD was the same as for the DX 4WD, there was however a separate picture of the car with its own paint job used in marketing material, as well as a small image on the side of the standard Burns DX box.

The paint jobs were simple with each of the three main models (Burns 2WD, 4WD and Turbo Burns), getting their own unique designs. Restorers typically try to emulate these to a certain extent which has also become easier in recent years due to third-party suppliers quality for reproduction bodies and decal sheets increasing.

The angular patterns and bold colors chosen for the box art matched the boxy lines of the car. The pictures on the Burns and Burns DX box-art were however most likely pre-production models as there are differences between the pictures and the final kit.

- Various decals were not available on the final decal sheet (including the number "1" on the 4WD DX, or the large "KYOSHO" on the back of the 2WD DX). These however were decals which were available on other Kyosho models at the time.
- The yellow fuel tank on the box art was white in the production model
- The shiny wheels nuts were replaced with black oxidized versions, the same goes for the nylon nuts on the shock towers
- Although included in the box, the rear torque rod and roll bar are not shown on the model. (Only applies to the Burns box not the Burns DX box)
- The positions of front upper left suspension arm and the rear upper suspension arm were mixed up and therefore not assembled correctly. (Only applies to the Burns box not the Burns DX box)

Fine red striping was done using Kyosho Micron Tape (can be seen if one has the original box).

The Burns and Burns DX both featured O.S. Max .21 VF-B engines, the Turbo Burns had an O.S. Max EX-B engine. O.S. engines would also feature prominently on the box art for later cars.

Towards the end of the DX production run the marketing material also showed a simplified paint job for the Burns DX which featured clear windows with painted safety nets and an O.S. EX-B engine instead of an O.S. VF-B engine.

=== Pricing ===
Although it was still not cheap, the Burns had mass appeal and brought the hobby within the reach of many younger hobbyists. At the time, a stock Burns DX 4WD with basic OS RF-B engine would cost around US$580 in the Tower Hobbies catalog, or US$710 Dollars with the competitive OS EX-B engine.

=== Collectability and current popularity (1992–) ===
Today, the original Burns (MP1) is a sought-after collector's item when in good condition with its original box and documentation. The most valuable of these, due to its rarity, is the original Burns produced from 1987 to 1988. The original Burns is however sought more by enthusiasts who have a special connection to that particular car, with most collectors and drivers purchasing the top-of-the-line Turbo Burns, which was out of reach for most hobbyists in the late 1980s.

There is a large community with several forums providing detailed information and restoration threads (see external reference list below). Hobbyists and parents that grew up in the 1980s also restore these. Although special option parts are relatively rare and expensive, regular spares and parts cars are available in abundance on sites such as eBay and craigslist making the Burns a very affordable and rugged entry level vehicle even today.

In lieu of noise restrictions and the advances of battery and brushless technology, some cars are also being converted to an electric powertrain. This does require some modifications to the car, so good-condition versions are typically left in stock condition for authenticity and value.

== Turbo Burns MP 2 (1989–1991) ==
=== Models and specifications ===
The Turbo Burns saw the first involvement of Yuichi Kanai who would later go on to develop the Inferno series of cars which won eight world championships from 1991 until 2010. As with many products in the 1980s and early 1990s, the Turbo nomenclature was used to indicate that it was a high-end model. Yuichi Kanai would also use the Turbo nomenclature for the later Inferno series.

Although it looked very different due to its new body shell, the "T. Burns" was only an evolution compared to its predecessor. It implemented small changes based on the lessons learned from the two years of competing with the original Burns, as well as introducing a large number of optional parts to fine-tune the performance of the vehicle.

The Turbo Burns was replaced with the classic Inferno 4WD in 1991, while the cheaper Burns DX 4WD was still on sale until the release of the Inferno DX in 1992.

==== Turbo Burns item no. 3097 (1989–1991) ====
The standard Turbo Burns was a competition-level buggy which provided not only the full specification of the original Burns 4WD but also the following changes and improvements.

- Longer wheelbase. Although the chassis plate in Burns and Turbo Burns are of the same length, the longer wheelbase in the Turbo Burns was achieved by moving the rear gear box further to the back.
- Counter-sunk screws in the chassis
- Adjustable center differential
- Longer wishbones at front
- Rear hub carriers with more setup options
- Larger capacity shock absorbers front and rear
- Newly designed, stronger shock stays/towers with more setup possibilities
- Rear anti-roll bar (stabilizer/sway bar). The possibility of adding a front stabilizer bar for the turbo burns came later with part number BSW79 after the classic inferno release.
- Fuel tank with spring loaded cap for faster refueling
- Newly designed tuned muffler and manifold
- New lexan body including wing and of course wing mount which were optional parts for the burns.
- New five-spoke wheels

==== Turbo Burns Special Champion Car "SCC"/"S.C.C." (1990 after World Championship – 1991) ====
The SCC was released towards the end of the Turbo Burns production after the IFMAR championships. Compared to the later post-championship releases of the Inferno series, this car came with very few of the optional parts which were available at the time. There were, however, several changes to the car which would become standard design elements for the Inferno cars starting in 1991 until today.

The SCC appears to have been a limited release for certain countries and dealers, it was not an official kit and is not mentioned in any catalogs. It had the same model number as the regular Turbo Burns and did not have any additional markings on the box or in the instructions to indicate that special optional parts were included. The special parts consisted of:

- BS-58 Rear wheel (additional set for the front of the car)
- BSW-28 Long shock absorbers (an additional set to be mounted to the front of the car)
- BSW-38 Rear carbon shock tower
- BSW-40 Multi-pin Tire (for front and rear, until this point all 1/8 scale Kyosho buggies had thinner tires at the front)
- BSW-43 Front brake system.
- BSW-50 Front carbon shock tower (made specifically to implement the longer rear shocks at the front)
- BSW-58 Flywheel nut

The SCC showed a glimpse of what the future Kyosho Inferno would become, the platform being a proving ground for parts which were to be carried over into the next generation of car. It is interesting to see which elements Yuichi Kanai took as is, and which were further developed or dropped all together for the Kyosho Inferno.

Although the wheels were redesigned and replaced with part BSW-80, the concept of having wide wheels at the front remained with all 1:8 scale Kyosho Buggies from this point forward. The BSW-40 tires were standard until the Kyosho MP5 was released in 1995.

The concept of having independently adjustable rear and front brake discs was also carried over to the Kyosho Inferno. The disc and caliper parts used for the front brake on the SCC were used as standard for both front and rear brakes on the Kyosho Inferno until the Inferno MP 7.5 a decade later. On the SCC the font brake was mounted to the front gearbox and operated through the centrally located servo used for the throttle and "rear" brake. The long, thin metal rod which connected the servo to the front bake had a tendency to flex, reducing the precision of the brakes and making adjustments more difficult. In addition the aluminum plate/brace mounted above the brake had to be removed to adjust the calipers. The braking system was redesigned for the Inferno so that both discs were attached to either end of center differential, thereby eliminating these issues. It is a principle design element which has not changed since.

The BSW-38 rear shock tower was made available as an optional part for all infernos up until the Kyosho MP5 for which the shock tower was completely redesigned.

The concept of having tall shock towers using the same springs and dampers as the rear of the car (parts BSW-50 and BSW-28), had not been implemented on any previous Kyosho 1:8 buggies and was abandoned after this single implementation. The classic Inferno reverted to the same springs and shock absorber setup as the standard Turbo Burns, with the concept of having a shorter suspension setup at the front remaining until the point of writing.

=== Notable optional parts ===
As there are relatively minor differences between the Burns models, and as the cars were designed to be upgradable from the beginning, the optional parts mentioned above could be used on any of the cars. There were also a few parts from other cars released at around the same time which were also compatible. This includes the "Brake Set" of the Fantom 20 track car (part FM-179), or the "Special Disc Brake Rotor" (part 39306) from the GP10 SuperTen on-road cars. One of the last optional parts produced for the Burns was the rare BSW-50 which was made for the Turbo Burns SCC. Initially the "classic" Inferno also used the BSW part numbers of which some could also be used for the Burns. These were:

- BSW-51 Special Engine Mount
- BSW-71 Rear Spoiler (in various colors)
- BSW-80 Wheels (in various colors)
- BSW-82 Front One Way Diff

In addition, a useful upgrade is the classic Inferno's standard differential which had four spider gears instead of two.

Although Kyosho did offer a similar sized, high-performance disc brake for its GP10 SuperTen range of cars (part 39306), an additional, common third-party upgrade was a resin disc brake made by Duratrax as the standard Kyosho disc made from plastic, had a tendency to melt under heavy, repeated loads. This is also an issue Kyosho recognized, and was most likely more apparent, on the heavier, Burns-based USA-1monster truck. From the USA-1 onwards Kyosho provided replaceable brake liners which could be stuck on either side of the disc. This brake liner was made available in the regular replacement brake set after this point (part BS-20) and could then be retro-fitted to the Burns models. The optional and smaller front brake set for the Turbo Burns (BSW-43), which became the standard rotor and pad used on the later Inferno, was supplied with brake liners from the start.

There were also a couple of suppliers which made optional parts in limited numbers. These parts were mostly machined aluminum parts which replace weaker plastic parts on the original Burns model, including the plastic mounts for the center differential. Kyosho recognized this weakness and redesigned the plastic mounts, and reinforced them with an aluminum brace plate from the classic Inferno onwards. In Germany this included Jamara, and Hötschick Tuning (later is no longer in business), which were both typically anodized in a purple color, and Crono Racing in France. The German hobby store Conzelmann Tuning made blue anodized parts including a one-piece aluminum radio plate which held both the steering and throttle servos. The plate was mounted to two blue anodized, solid aluminum center differential mounts.

These hobby stores also competed in races with their own cars to test and showcase their products. Crono Racing raced the Koysho Burns successfully in France in the 1980s, and still has a shop in Paris, France.

=== Box art and marketing material ===
The new rounded body received more flowing lines and calmer blue coloring with a color matching O.S. Max .21 EX-B engine. There are two minor differences between the box model and the final model:

- The image on the side of the box which shows the underside of the car with the optional BSW7 chassis plate with holes drilled further back to position the rear gear box towards the rear and therefore achieving a longer wheelbase. In the picture there are eight holes in the chassis for the rear gear box with the original four being covered up. It is believed that the final production chassis was not ready when the box photo was taken.
- The body on the box art is missing the "bubble" on the left side which was required to ensure free movement of the linkage on the throttle servo. This space was added on the final production body.

The success of the Turbo Burns body shape was apparent in the design of the shells for the Kyosho Inferno cars right up until the Inferno MP9 nearly 20 years later.

=== Pricing ===
A Turbo Burns with OS EX-B engine could cost nearly US$900 at the time which put it out of reach of most RC enthusiasts and has added to the desirability of the car today. Adjusted for inflation in 2019, this would be approximately $1800. To put this into perspective, the current Kyosho MP10 with a competition engine retails for $860.

=== Collectability and current popularity (1992–) ===
Due to its high sales price at the time the Turbo Burns is highly sought-after, not only by collectors but also by adults who could not afford this car during their childhood. The most valuable are typically mint condition Turbo Burns with the paint job and OS EX-B engine which were shown on the box art. A mint condition, regular Turbo Burns will generally exceed US$500 with this configuration. Mint condition SCC variants are typically valued even higher.

As with the Burns (MP1), there are many forums and threads dedicated to this car. The value of the Turbo Burns in relation to the original can often be seen in the level of dedication invested by their owners, with some cars being restored to what can be described as "concourse condition". As with the original Burns and Burns DX, these cars are also being converted to brushless technology.
