= Mini-Z =

Line of electric radio-controlled cars

Mini-Z with a Lamborghini body.

Mini-Z is a brand name for a popular line of 1:28-scale electric radio-controlled cars manufactured by Kyosho Corporation, a Japanese manufacturer of various radio-controlled devices. Kyosho makes a wide number of bodies for the Mini-Z. The wheelbase can range from 86mm to 106mm. The bodies are all highly detailed, realistic looking, and fully painted with a high gloss paint. The bodies are so realistic that many are collected as display models and the bodies come with a dummy chassis and wheels for display purposes.

Popular bodies for racing are the 98mm wheelbase bodies of the McLaren and Ferrari Enzo. The Enzo allows for a very wide track due to the extreme offset wheels and low center of gravity with quite a bit of steering bite due to the extreme nose on the car, while the McLaren offers lightweight and very dynamic, nimble handling. 94mm chassis are also popular for racing due to lower polar moment of inertia and weight distribution. Classic bodies include Lancia Stratos, Lotus Europa, Porsche 934 and 935, Lamborghini Countach, Shelby Cobra and many others.

Mini-Z comes with parts to adjust wheelbase and motor location to fit the body. Different bodies will handle differently due to wheelbase and distribution of the masses. A rear engine car like the Porsche 934 has a rear motor mount with the motor behind the axle, so the Mini-Z replicates somewhat the handling characteristics of the real car. The Mini-Z can be extensively modified with parts both from Kyosho Corporation and from aftermarket suppliers. The cars and modification parts are typically available in hobby stores and through online hobby retailers. Many hobbyists race their cars against others. Top speeds for a stock Mini-Z can reach 12 mph. With a moderately modified Mini-Z using off the shelf parts, 35 mph is achievable. A highly modified Mini-Z can actually surpass 61 mph or 99 km/h. However, given the size of the cars, its scale speed would be equivalent to 1850 mph. At that speed, it is impossible to negotiate corners, and most races are won with good cornering techniques rather than speed.

== History ==
Kyosho first introduced the Mini-Z in 1999, touted as "The RC industry's first palm-top size RC car". The first 3 cars were Subaru WRX, Mitsubishi Lancer Evo VI and Nissan Skyline GTR. Cars were on a MR-01 chassis.

The formula racer F1 came next. The F1 is larger than a Mini-Z. Next, the Monster, then the Overland. Both Monster and Overland were rear wheel drive even though they are trucks. Both are not serious off-road vehicles. Servo and drive gears were not well protected.

The breakthrough MR02 chassis next arrived. Finally the Mini-Z racer had a servo saver (a servo saver is a flexible link between the servo and its linkage that protects the servo's internal gears from damage during impacts or stress). Batteries were laid flat instead of stacking two up. This chassis is still popular with racers to this day. The first MR02 body was the Ferrari Enzo. It was a mid-motor configuration. However, the MR02 chassis did not fit the MR-01 bodies.

PN racing was one of the first aftermarket supplier to design an "H-plate" that allows the MR01 motor mount to be installed on an MR02 chassis. They called it the MR one and a half, or MR1.5. This allows all the previous bodies to mount on the MR02 chassis.

Next, Kyosho produced the MR015, a narrow chassis with batteries stacked 2 up like the MR01, but with a servo saver and front suspension that is same as the MR02. The MR015 used a rear motor mount similar to MR01, which allows all the previous bodies to be mounted to the MR015.

The AWD was released next, then the Mini-Z Lit, which is a smaller car than the Mini-Z (about 4" length and wheelbase of 65 to 78mm). The Lit was not very popular. The next technology release was the AD band, which is the FM version of Mini-Z. This version took care of a glitch with the AM cars when several are running on the same track. However, AD band had a bug in the system where it would shut down intermittently. It is believed to be due to static build up when cars are run on foam RCP track, but this theory has never been proven conclusively.

ASF 2.4 GHz radio was produced next, in Feb 2008, along with MR02-LM chassis. The LM chassis is basically MR02 chassis, but with a 4 mm longer low motor pod. This longer chassis is generally used for LeMan type bodies. The ASF 2.4 GHz finally took care of the glitch issue with AM and shut down issue with AD Band. A major problem remains where it requires about one second in neutral before it will go in reverse. This introduces excessive delay during a race.

The dNaNo was recently introduced, but it is not a Mini-Z. It is a 1/43 scale racer introduced around March 2008. It has a built-in universal timing system which records every lap time driven on an official track and posts it at the official page for everyone to see.Race dNaNo Local driving on a global scale. Most of the tracks are located in the US but there are some tracks Thailand, Japan and China. More tracks being built in Europe.

Since the introduction of the Mini-Z's in 1999, the sales for the next five years (2004) resulted in over 500,000 Mini-Z cars sold. The next five subsequent years has seen an explosion of the advanced and more popular MR02 body which was introduced in 2004 and now results in over 200 Mini-Z production body styles. from their advanced factories; a state of the art race track named, "KYOSHO OMOTESANDO" located in Tokyo that includes renting the highest quality Mini-Z's to race on a banked racetrack that even includes a wet bar and a light meal for the guests; and a museum of sorts called the "Mini Car Gallery Pit" where factory originals are on display of over 500 models for visitors to browse and even purchase current production models.

The latest mini-z chassis released at the end of October 2009 was the MR03 chassis. The most noticeable change is using dynamic strut front suspension instead of sliding knuckle. It uses a small coreless servo motor instead of the brushed servo motor for steering. Small servo motor allows the batteries to be closer to the centerline of the car for lower polar moment if inertia. The modified ASF receiver board comes with a reverse delay of exactly .01 second, which for all practical purposes is instant. The reverse delay can be programmed back in using the optional computer interface cable. The MR-03, like the dNaNo, has an optional gyro that can be installed on the car. The gyro senses when the car is about the spin out. It corrects by reducing power to the motor or by correcting steering. The amount of throttle and steering correction from the gyro can be programmed via the ASF connector. The front end of the car has interchangeable parts to allow use of both narrow and wide AutoScale bodies. The rear end of the car uses a different t-plate design but the motor pod mounting holes are the same. This allows motor mounts from the previous generation MR-02 and MR-015 cars to work on an MR-03. The MR-03 chassis works with all currently available Kyosho Mini-Z bodies.

Kyosho America opened up a Mini-Z track at the corporate headquarters in April 2010. The Kyosho track used carpet instead of the popular foam RCP modular track system.

== Racing ==
There are many different racing leagues for these cars around the world. In Canada & the United States, RCP tracks are the standard racing surface. The tracks are made from interlocking mats of EVA foam that are about 1/2" thick. They have a two surfaces on each tile; one is rough to allow for high traction and the flip-side is smoother to offer a more challenging racing experience. In Asia and European countries, Ozite-type carpet is a popular surface. There is less traction compared to the RCP, so traction is more difficult to obtain.

The popularity of Mini-Z is partly due to the relatively low cost of the stock car compared to 1/10 scale RC racing and the small space requirement. This is all relative though as a fully adjustable Mini-Z with high power motor, upgraded electronics and radio, suspension and exotic material support parts can easily end up on the expense level of some of the larger scales of RC racing. However, unlike 1/10 scale racing, a moderately modified Mini-Z can be fully competitive.

Since most Mini-Z motors are already powerful, equipment is not as important to winning as driving is. A full-scale race course can be set up in the driveway of a home, and with the RCP tracks, it can be taken down in less than 15 minutes with help. Since Mini-Z can be run on a driveway or garage, larger scale racers have used it to practise without having to travel to a track. Skills gained on a Mini-Z are transferable to other scale R/C cars.

=== Race Types ===
In the United States, the biggest race is the PN Racing World Cup event. The format of this annual series includes regional races held around the country concluding with the world cup final.

The HFAY racing series is held online allowing competitors to race remotely. For this series, a local club or an individual builds a race track using standard RCP track components and posts their time online. This type of race format allows racers from around the world to compete in the same event.

Another unique race is the 12 hours LeMans endurance race, previously held in Germany and Spain. The race includes simulated rain (achieved with vehicles using slick tyres) and night running where the venue lights are turned off for an hour, and cars drive using built-in headlights.

== Chassis types ==
- MR-01 (The original Mini-Z)
- MR-015 (The MR-02 with a vertical battery layout to accommodate narrow bodies. Shares improved electronics, servo saver, and rear shock of the mr-02; width of chassis and battery layout are the same as MR-01)
- MR-02 (The MR-01 chassis completely redesigned with improved electronics, servo saver, lower battery layout, wider front end. AM frequency)
- MR-02ASF (MR-02 chassis with new 2.4GHZ electronics from KO Propo)
- MR-02LM (An upgrade of the MR02 with 2.4 GHz ASF electronics, wider front and rear end, longer wheelbase, improved motor mount design and dual plate suspension system)
- MR-02EX (All in one kit ready to run right out of the box. Great as a starter)
- MR-015/02 iSeries (Same chassis as 015/02, but with cheaper ESC without brake)
- MR-03 (A new chassis with dynamic strut front suspension and new ASF receiver. Changeable front width to fit all bodies)
- MR-03VE (The next evolution of the MINI-Z Racer now incorporates the latest Team Orion XSPEED VE brushless motor into its performance)
- MR-03 Sports (Same as MR-03, but with a 2.4 GHz HFS radio system. Not compatible with the earlier 2.4 GHz AFS radios)
- MR-03 Sports 2 (The advanced gyro unit (MZW431) that can be mounted on the Mini-Z AWD Sports, is also able to be mounted on the MINI-Z Racer Sports 2 MR-03).
- MA-010 (all-wheel-drive version with same width as MR-01/015. Chassis also available in: SP & DWS TikiTiki versions)
- MA-015 (New all-wheel-drive version using the newer MR-03 Electronics. Chassis also available in: DWS version)
- MA-020 new awd, frontend similar to MR-03
- MA-020 Sports: same as MA-020. Drift readyset. Without ICS.
- Mini-Z LIT (Compact 1/28th RC car, comparable to a 1/32 scale car)
- Buggy/MB-010 (The precision chassis features a shaft driven 4WD with a two-differential drive train incorporating a slipper clutch to protect gears with oil shocks on the 4-wheel independent double wishbone suspension)
- Comic Racer/MB-011 (Same as Buggy/MB-010 but comes with Shock Stay and Body Mount Set for Comic Racer setup)
- MF-01 (Formula One style open-wheel AM )
- MF-015 (Formula One style open-wheel 2.4ghz ASF. Primary change was chassis front end to accommodate needs of updated F1 scale bodies )
- Overland (SUV/truck type)
- Monster/MV-01 (Monster truck Its destructive running power will dominate your own indoor off-road courses. With plenty of suspension stroke, you can turn your living room into an off-road obstacle course)
- NASCAR Series (a MR-015i with longer wheelbase)
- Moto Racer (The very popular Moto GP machines have been truly shrunk down to a 1:18 scale model that will fit in the palm of your hand)
- 4x4 (Off-Road scale crawler with solid axle on both front and rear, not water resistant)

== Available bands ==
- AM 27 MHz
- AD Band
- 2.4 GHz
