= Thunder Tiger =

Taiwanese radio controlled and autonomous vehicle manufacturer

Thunder Tiger Corporation 雷虎科技股份有限公司
- Type: Public company TPE: 8033
- Industry: Technology
- Founded: 1979
- Headquarters: Xitun, Taichung, Taiwan
- Products: Radio control models Unmanned autonomous vehicles Dental handpiece
- Revenue: US$28 million (2017)
- Number of employees: 208
- Website: www.thundertiger.com

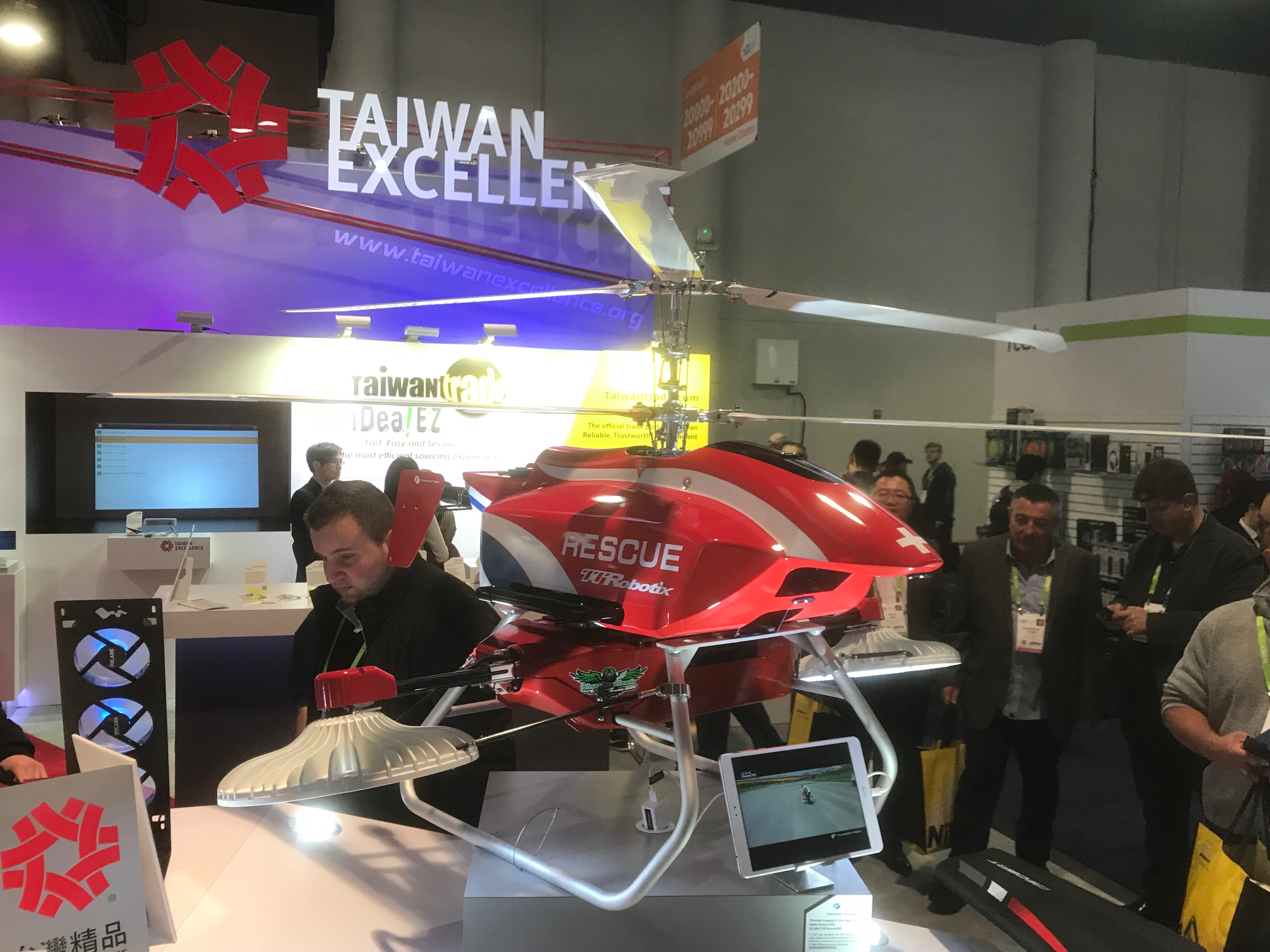
Thunder Tiger Search and Rescue Sirius CX-180 Helicopter

Thunder Tiger Corporation (Chinese: 雷虎科技股份有限公司; pinyin: Léi Hǔ Kējì Gǔfèn Yǒuxiàn Gōngsī) is a Taiwanese manufacturer of radio controlled models for the consumer market and more serious uncrewed vehicles for the government/defense market.

== History ==
Thunder Tiger Group was founded in Taichung in 1979. In 1997, it purchased ACE R/C corporation in America. Its 1/8 EB4 car was honored as an Offroad Champion of Europe in 1999. It established a marketing center in Germany for Europe in 2004 and purchased Associated Electrics, an American-based company, in 2005 for $9.5 million.

In 2012, Thunder Tiger established a new company, TTBIO Corp., to provide dental instruments, accessories, machining parts, and components to customers.

Following the widespread use of drones in the Russian invasion of Ukraine, the official drone development program was expanded to include non-state-owned companies, including Thunder Tiger as prime contractors for the first time. The government views drones as a destabilizing technology whose adoption would allow Taiwan to asymmetrically counter the threat from the PLA.

Thunder Tiger had a booth at the 2023 and 2024 Association of the United States Army's annual trade show. In 2023 they displayed only reconnaissance drones, but in 2024, both reconnaissance and suicide drones were exhibited. They also exhibited a naval surface drone in 2024.

Auterion's drone software has been integrated with Thunder Tiger's Overkill FPV drone. Thunder Tiger and Auterion's initial agreement covers 25,000 drones for both the Taiwanese and export markets.

== Products ==
=== Civilian ===
Thunder Tiger is the maker of MT4-G3, Raptor e720, Ghost+ drone, and R/C submarine - Neptune SB-1.

=== Government ===
- Overkill Killer, explosive FPV drone

==== Seawolf ====
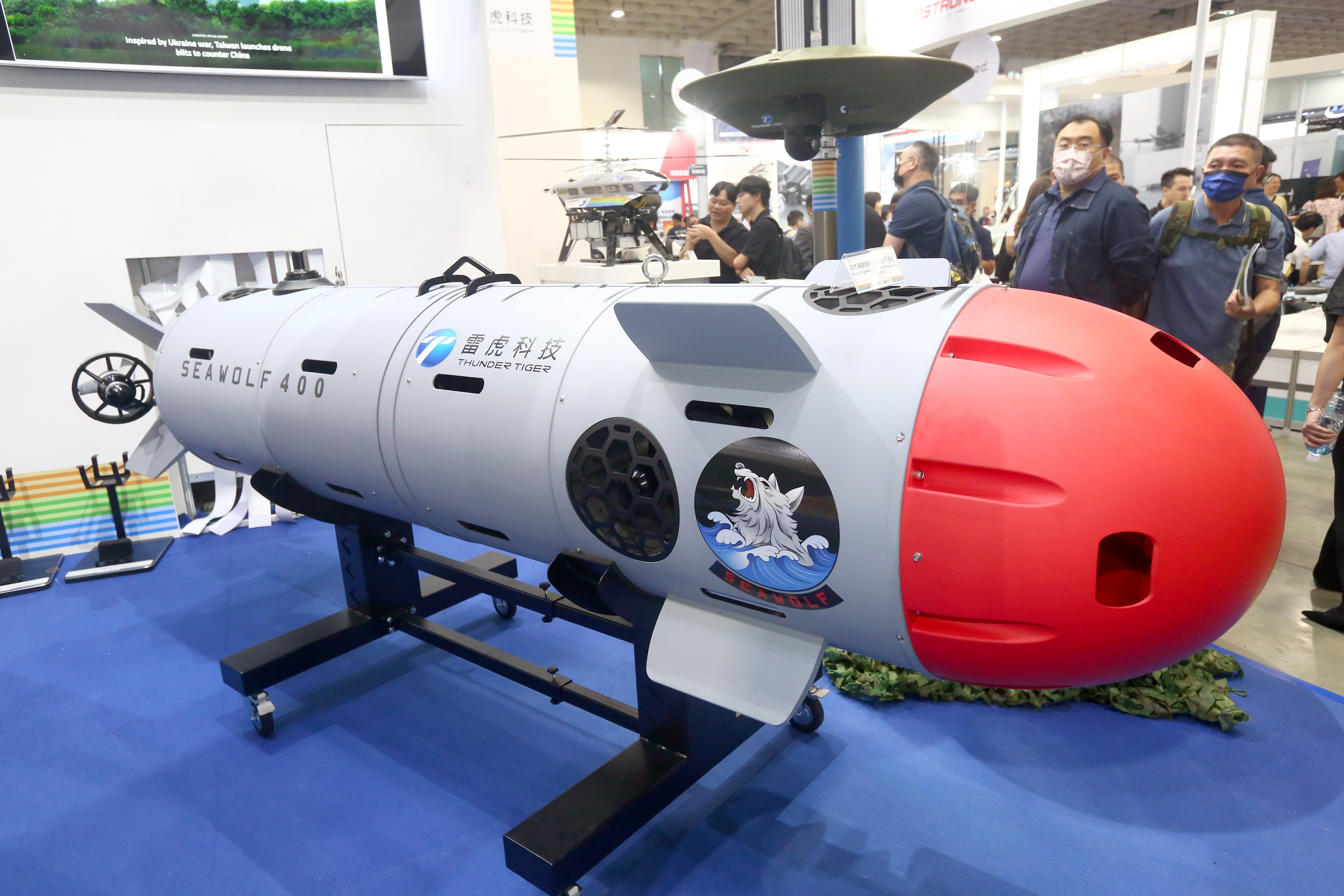
Seawolf 400 displayed at the Taipei Aerospace & Defense Technology Exhibition in 2023

Family of autonomous underwater vehicles:

- Seawolf 400

==== Seashark ====
Family of uncrewed surface vessels. Multiple vessels can be controlled from a single base station:

- Seashark 80
- Seashark 200
- Seashark 400
- Seashark 680
- Seashark 800, 2,600lb warhead and 310 miles of range

== See also ==
- List of companies of Taiwan
- Defense industry of Taiwan
- National Chung-Shan Institute of Science and Technology
- DronesVision
