= Associated Electrics =

Radio-controlled car manufacturer

- Native name: Associated Electrics
- Founded: 1964 in Lynwood, California, United States
- Founders: Roger Curtis; Lee Yurada
- Headquarters: Lake Forest, California, United States
- Key people: Gene Husting, Cliff Lett, Roger Curtis, Mike Reedy, Rick Hohwart, Brent Thielke, Shawn Ireland
- Brands: Reedy Power, Factory Team, XP, Element RC
- Parent: Thunder Tiger
- Website: associatedelectrics.com rc10.com

Associated Electrics, Incorporated, commonly Team Associated, is a manufacturer of radio controlled cars, trucks and accessories. It is owned by Taiwanese company Thunder Tiger and headquartered in Lake Forest, California.

== Early history ==
The company was founded in 1964 by Roger Curtis and Lee Yurada, technicians at the Douglas Aerophysics Laboratory in nearby El Segundo, California. Slot cars were at the height of their popularity in Southern California at the time, so Curtis and Yurada decided to open a slot car track as a side business. Their experience in fabricating aircraft parts soon led them into producing slot car parts and accessories. So successful was the venture that it turned into a full-time business which they named Associated Electrics. The new company specialized in the manufacturing of a full line of slot car parts, chassis and accessories.

The business had grown by 1969 and was located in a small building in Paramount. Personal issues arose between Curtis and Yurada, leading Curtis to approach early RC racer Gene Husting in hopes that Husting would buy Yurada's share of Associated. The popularity of slot cars was on the wane, but Husting was certain that radio control would flourish as the technology grew. Almost as if in anticipation of the fact, Associated had just introduced a 1:8-scale gas-powered racer, the RC1. Designed by Mike Morrisey, it soon became the most successful car on the circuit. Husting agreed to the buyout in 1970. Still a small business, Associated had only six employees: Husting, Curtis, Husting's wife Midge, and three others.

== Radio control takes off ==
In 1971, Associated moved to Santa Ana, California where they began production of the Husting-designed Associated RC100, a 1:8-scale nitro vehicle. In 1977, the first IFMAR race at Pomona's Thorp Raceway (later to become the Ranch Pit Stop, temporary home of Team Losi) saw the first five places swept by the RC100. RC100 was the second remote control vehicle released by Associated Electrics. It rose to quick dominance in the industry, sweeping the first 5 places at the IFMAR World Championships in 1977.[1] The RC100 went on to win the ROAR Nationals in 1976 and the first IFMAR World Championships in 1977, driven by Associated drivers Butch Kroells 1st, Bill Jianis 2nd and Gene Husting took 3rd place.[2]

== Industry develops along with the RC12 ==
Associated would double in size thanks to Roger's next design, the 1:12-scale RC12 electric onroad racer, debuted in 1978. Simpler and far less expensive than the gas powered RC100, the RC12 is credited for much of the hobby's growth as a sport.

== Expansion into Reedy electric motors ==
As electric racing continued to grow, 1980 would see one of Associated's most important partnerships come to fruition when electrical engineer and avid R/C racer Mike Reedy joined Associated. Reedy's development of Yokomo-based motors and carefully matched battery packs led Associated's dominance of electric racing. Reedy-powered cars are credited with 28 IFMAR World Championships to date, the most of any R/C motor manufacturer.

== The RC10 generates a new phase of expansion ==
Early model RC10 buggy.

Roger Curtis's 1984 design of a serious 1:10-scale electric offroad car not only led to explosive growth within the company, but within the world of R/C racing as well. This new vehicle was the now-famous Associated RC10 buggy. Built on a 6061 aircraft alloy chassis, the new car was, unlike its Japanese counterparts of the time, a serious offroad racing machine. Another 1-2-3 IFMAR sweep would follow in 1985 at the first IFMAR 1:10 Electric Off-Road World Championship. The RC10, possibly more than any R/C vehicle before or since, is credited with making the single biggest impact on radio control racing. The success of the RC10 forced Associated to move to a larger facility, which they found in Costa Mesa in 1987.

That same year, former Yamaha technician and professional R/C racer Cliff Lett joined Associated to head the research and development department. This department, consisting of Lett, Roger Curtis and Husting's son, Curtis, were responsible for the RC10 cars that won the IFMAR World Championships in 1989 in Australia, and in 1991 in Detroit. The success of the RC10 coupled with other cars of the time, namely the RC12LW, the RC10L, RC10LSS and the RC10T kept production going for five years and prompted the necessity of extending their building in Costa Mesa.

Gene Husting helped develop cars for Associated until 2000, when he retired. He is responsible for the lineup up to the RC10B3, RC10T3, TC3 and GT RTRs. Five years after his retirement, the company introduced an entirely new line of offroad racers with the introduction the 1:18 scale electric RC18T and RC18MT miniature trucks. In 2006, with 27 IFMAR victories in all, Team Associated is the world's "winningest" RC car manufacturer. Reedy motors, a division of Associated, has powered 28 IFMAR World Champions.

R&D manager and world-class driver Cliff Lett broke the RC land speed record of more than 111 mph (179 km/h) with a heavily modified Associated RC10L3 touring car at Irwindale Speedway on January 13, 2001.

A modified RC10 with an off-the-shelf Parma International 1963 Chevrolet Corvette body was used in the famous chase scene in the 1988 motion picture, The Dead Pool. In it, Clint Eastwood as Dirty Harry is being pursued through the streets of San Francisco, California by a highly explosive bomb disguised as an RC car. The "bomb" was actually driven by IFMAR world-champion race driver Jay Halsey. The car was in fact an electric; the sounds of a nitro-powered engine were added in post-production.

== New ownership ==
In 2000, Gene Husting took the decision to retire and sold his share to Roger Curtis. In 2005, Curtis took semi-retirement and sold Associated Electrics to Thunder Tiger, a Taiwanese RC model manufacturer. Thunder Tiger expressed hope that the buyout of Associated would make it the fourth largest RC model merchant in the world, following the three leaders at that time (in order) Tamiya, Kyosho, and Futaba/O.S. Engines.

== Offshoots and conversions ==
Team Associated cars have inspired various conversion from small companies. Several offroad buggies have been developed from the TC3 chassis, most notably the TC3 'o', the Durango range, and recently (and most successfully) JConcepts with their BJ4 and Worlds-winning BJ4 'Worlds'.

All these cars are based around the TC3's drivetrain, which uses two bevel-geared differentials (or "diffs"), with a prop shaft connecting them. On the BJ4, JConcepts used AE diff cases and diffs, and modified the shaft to include a slipper unit. Since then, JConcepts has updated the BJ4 to the Worlds-winning 'Worlds' edition. In Summer 2006, JConcepts "turned the drawings over to Team Associated, which took over and fine-tuned the design for fit and finish" (RC Driver magazine, Dec. 2007). The Associated B44 debuted at the 2007 EP Off-Road World Championships, where it not only qualified on top, but took all three podium positions.

X-Factory, creators of the X-5 4WD Team Losi conversion, released the X-6 conversion kit which converts the B4 Buggy into a mid-motor 4x2 cell configuration chassis.

In the onroad scene, the Associated RC12 series of cars have long been a base for other manufacturers. The unique front suspension from the RC12L3 (and updated on the RC12L4) has become industry standard and is now featured on the majority of competitive 1:12-scale racing chassis.

== See also ==
- RC12
- RC100
