= Kyosho =

Japanese scale model manufacturer

Kyosho Corporation
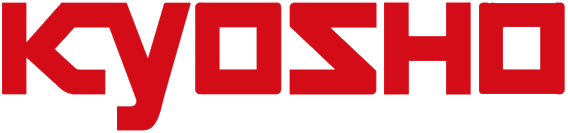
- Type: Joint-stock
- Industry: Manufacturing
- Founded: October 10, 1963; 63 years ago
- Founder: Hisashi Suzuki
- Headquarters: Chiyoda, Tokyo, Japan
- Key people: Yoshiyuki Chikuba (president); Masayuki Suzuki (advisor); Akihisa Suzuki (chairman); Katsumi Watanabe (director); Naohiko Otsuki (Executive director)
- Products: Radio-controlled model cars, airplanes, helicopters, boats, die-cast model cars
- Brands: Inferno; Mini-Z
- Operating income: 521,160,000 yen (as of April, 2006)
- Number of employees: 170 (as of April 2006)
- Website: kyosho.com

Kyosho Corporation (京商株式会社, Kyōshō Kabushiki Kaisha) is a Japanese company based in Tokyo, which operates internationally under the name KYOSHO. The company's main office is located in Chiyoda, and the production headquarters are located in Atsugi, Kanagawa.

Established in October 1963, Kyosho created its first trademark radio-controlled model car in 1970, being one of the oldest RC makers in Japan, and producing a variety of products, including cars, airplanes, helicopters, and boats. Kyosho also produces die-cast model cars, which production started in 1992.

Its major competitor in the RC automobile market is Tamiya. Kyosho has avoided direct competition against Tamiya in the hobby grade RC cars market since the 80s and 90s, where Tamiya was most active, focusing instead on designing professional 1/8 scale racing buggies, Mini-Z series, and RC helicopters. The company is best known for the Inferno, its 1:8 scale competition buggies; Mini-Z series, and RC helicopters, but it also produces remote-controlled bipedal robots in the Manoi series.

== R/C Products ==
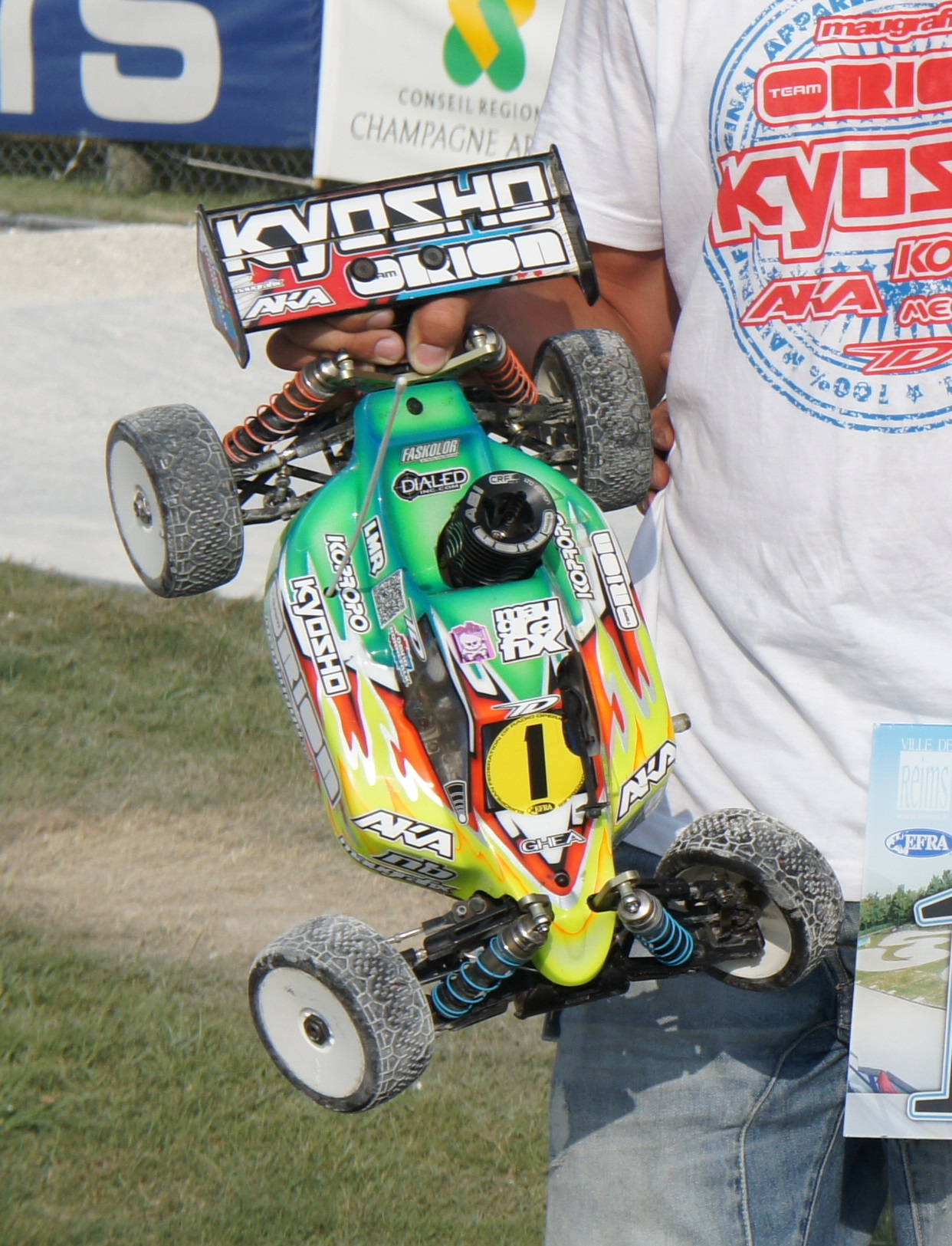
The Inferno MP9 TKI3 of David Ronnefalk, 2013 EFRA champion

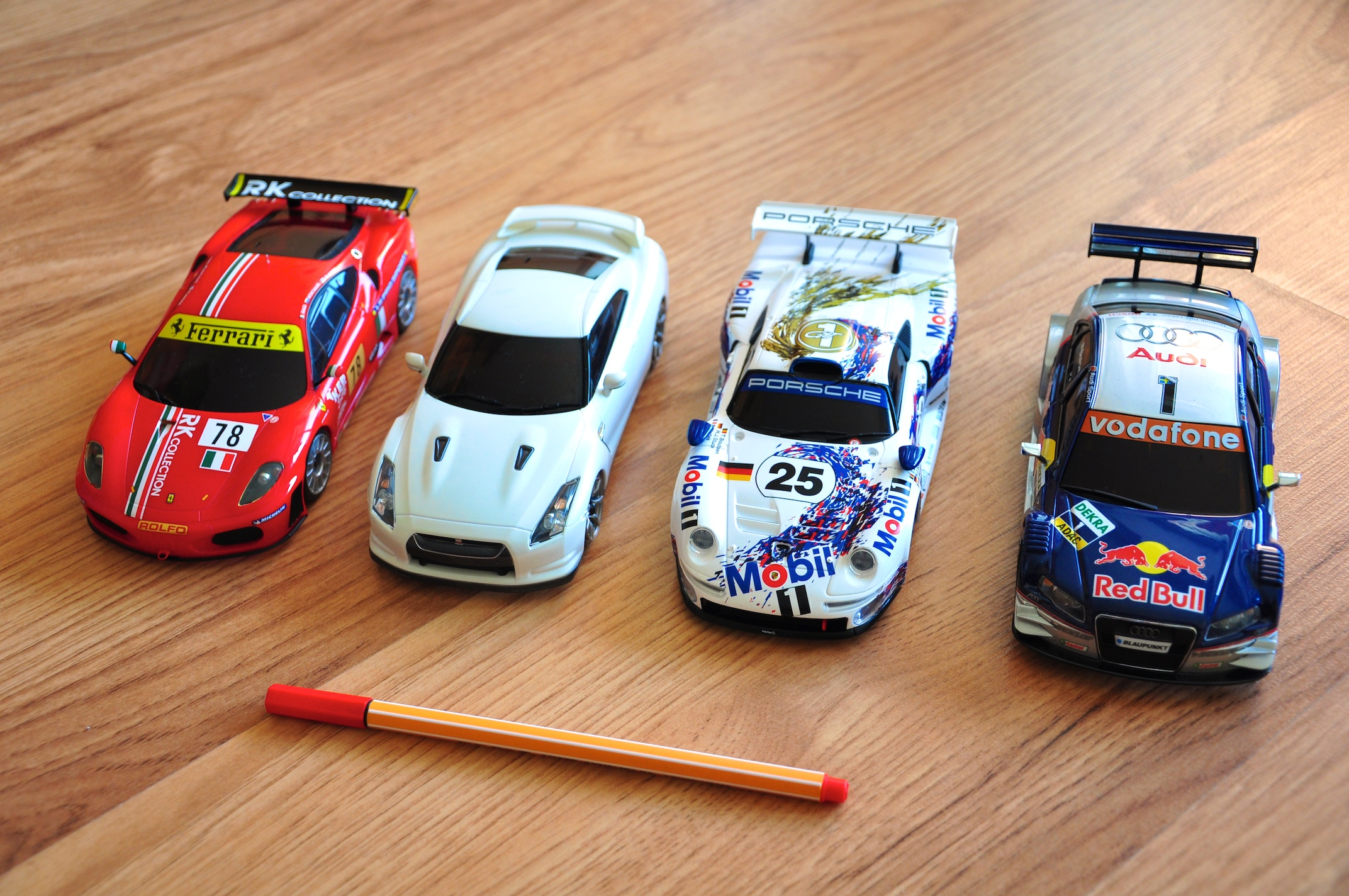
Various Mini-Z models

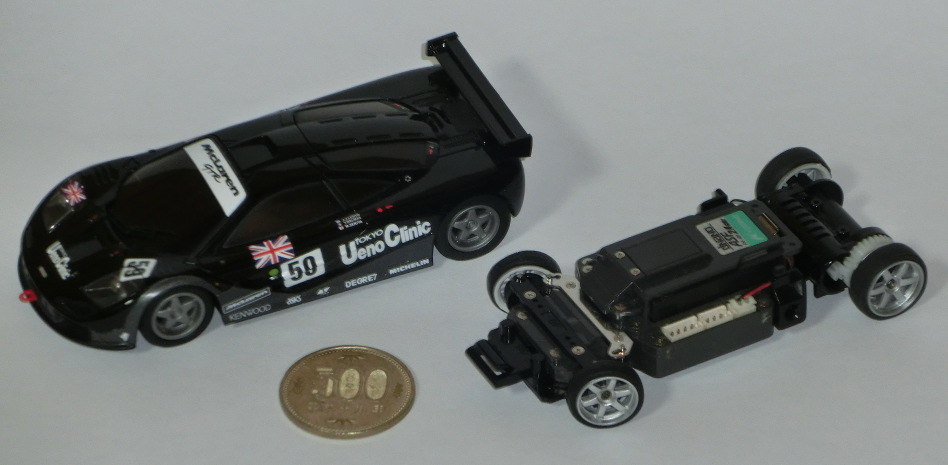
DNano display model and chassis

Kyosho produces a wider range of RC products than any other RC manufacturer, including racing and ready-to-run cars, trucks, excavators, helicopters, scale, sport and warbird RC planes, and a range of RC boats. Having recently acquired Team Orion, Kyosho now has category-leading products in electric motors (brushed and brushless), Ni-MH and Li-PO batteries and battery chargers.

Notable Products

- 1/8 scale engine cars
- 1/10 scale engine cars
- 1/10 scale electric cars
- 1/50 scale electric earth moving equipment
- 1/28 scale Mini-Z racers
- 1/43 Dnano

Products that have won the IFMAR World Championship

- 1/10 Electric Off Road 2WD
  - 1987 - Ultima
  - 2013 - Ultima RB6
- 1/10 IC Track
  - 2004 - PureTen V-One RRR
  - 2008 - PureTen V-One RRR Evo 2
- 1/8 IC Off Road
  - 1992 - Inferno
  - 1994 - Turbo Inferno
  - 1996 - Inferno MP-5
  - 1998 - Inferno MP-6
  - 2000 - Inferno MP-7.5
  - 2002 - Inferno MP-7.5
  - 2006 - Inferno MP777 WC
  - 2010 - Inferno MP9 TKI2
- 1/8 IC Track
  - 2003 - Evolva
  - 2005 - Evolva 2005
  - 2007 - Evolva M3
  - 2009 - Evolva M3 Evo

=== Engine cars ===
Notable current models

- 1/8 off-road
  - Inferno neo 3.0 2019
- 1/8 on-road
  - Evolva series (Evolva 2003, Evolva 2005, Evolva 2007, Evolva M3, Evolva M3 Evo)
  - Inferno GT series
- 1/7 off-road
  - Scorpion GP XXL
- 1/8 off-road
  - ST series
- 1/8 off-road
  - Inferno
- 1/10 on-road
  - Pure-Ten series (Alpha, Alpha II, Alpha III, V-ONE, FW-05T, FW-06, FAZER)
- 1/10 off-road
  - Inferno TR15
  - DBX/DST/DRT/DRX
- 1/16 off-road
  - GP Mini Inferno 09

Notable past models

- 1/8 on-road
  - Fantom series
  - Esprit GP20 Supereight
- 1/8 off-road
  - LandJump
  - Circuit 20
  - USA-1
  - Mad Force/FO-XX/Kruiser
  - Burns
  - Inferno
  - Landmax
- 1/10 off-road
  - Circuit 10 series
- 1/12 off-road
  - PeanutBuggy series
- 1/12 on-road
  - PeanutRacer series

=== Electric on-road cars ===
Notable current models

- 1/10 touring scale
  - TF-5
  - TF-5 stallion
  - TF-6
- 1/28 scale Mini-Z racers
  - MR-03
  - MA-030

Notable past models

- 1/12 scale
  - SuperSport
  - MachSport
  - SonicSport
  - LaserSport
  - Super Alta
  - Fantom EP-4WD
  - Plazma EP 2WD MarkI, Mark II, and Mark III
  - Fantom EXT EP-4WD
  - Axis EX
  - ImpressR961
- 1/10 touring scale
  - PureTen EP Spider
  - PureTen EP Spider TF-2
  - PureTen EP Spider TF-3
  - PureTen EP Spider TF-4 Type-R
  - KX-One
  - PureTen
- 1/28 scale Mini-Z racers
  - MR-01
  - MR-015
  - MR-02
  - MA-010
  - MA-015
  - MA-020

=== Electric off-road cars ===
During the 1980s, the 1/10 scale electric off-road car (buggy) was immensely popular, leading to the release of several different models. Many of these models have retained popularity, even after going out of production.

==== Notable models ====
- 1978 Eleck Peanuts
- 1979 Rally-sports Renault Alpine A310
- 1982 Scorpion
- 1983 Tomahawk
- 1984 Progress 4WDS
- 1985 Optima/Javelin
- 1987 Ultima
- 1988 Optima Mid
- 1989 Turbo Optima Mid
- 1989 Lazer ZX
- 2005 Lazer ZX-5
- 2010 Lazer ZX-5 FS2

==== DASH 1 ====
Kyosho started selling the DASH 1 in 1970, accepted widely in the industry as the first RC car made in Japan. There were three body styles to be chosen from; the most popular racing machines in the Japanese Grand Prix: the Porsche 917, Lola T70 and McLaren Elva. The bodies were vacuum molded, a totally new innovation in RC cars at the time. The DASH 1 was priced at 23,000 yen, not including the engine. Engines used were still the imported 19-class VECO (West Germany) and K&B (U.S.A.) marine engines with a Perry Carburettor and Kyosho's Fuel Stopper and a car muffler.

==== DASH 2 ====
In 1971 the DASH 2 targeted at beginners (price: 16,500 Yen) was released. The DASH 1 used a two-piece chassis, but the DASH 2 had a one-piece chassis and the engine was only at a slight front angle. In addition, the SUPER DASH (price: 26,000 Yen) was released as a competition level machine.

==== DASH 3 ====
The DASH 3 and the DUNE BUGGY were released in 1972, starting the buggy racing phenomenon.

==== Eleck Peanuts ====
This was the first electric off-road car sold by Kyosho. A motor was placed on the PeanutBuggy, which had previously been sold as an engine car. It was sold for 9,800 yen at the time.

==== Rally-sports ====
A 2WD off-road car with a RS540 motor in the rear. The frame was that of the Alpine A310. Uses a double wishbone for front suspension, and a semi-streaming arm for rear suspension. The cars aluminum frame and rear design were passed on to the Scorpion. Sold for 16,000 yen at the time.

==== Scorpion ====
Races with electric off-road cars increased in popularity after the release of Tamiya's Rough Rider. The 2WD "Scorpion" was released by Kyosho during this period. Kyosho had been promoting its 1/8 scale engine buggy "Circuit 20" in races at the time, and the Scorpion can be described as a miniaturized version of the Circuit 20. The double trailing arm front suspension, semi-streaming rear suspension, aluminum ladder frame, rear-mounted RS540S motor, oil damper and coil springs very much resemble the design for a 1/8 scale racing buggy of the time. The thin body was realized by placing the batteries pointing forward, and its light weight (1680g, with full equipment) gave it a huge advantage over rival models. Its main rivals were Tamiya's Rough Rider and ayk's 556B.

The "Tomahawk" uses the same suspension as the Scorpion, but its layout was completely made over. The plastic mech box was changed to a double-deck mech plate, allowing its weight to decrease to 1,450g. It was sold for 19,800 yen at the time.

The "Turbo Scorpion" was also derived from the Scorpion. This model was sold for 19,800 yen at the time.

The same chassis was used for the engine driven models "Advance" and "Assault" These were popular models at the time but not near as popular as the original Scorpion.

In 2012 Kyosho presented a new model using the Scorpion name: the Kyosho Scorpion XXL. It is a 1/7th scale rear wheel drive dune buggy available in both brushless and glow powered RTR options as well as a kit that can be built either way and swapped as the modeller desires. However, this car is completely unrelated to the original Scorpion in its parts.

In 2014 Kyosho announced a re released version of Scorpion, refined where needed so it can be outfitted with modern gear such as Lipo and brushless motor. Modern highlights include a slipper clutch, 48-pitch geartrain, compatibility with the Ultima RB's ball diff (as an upgrade from the supplied gear diff), and wide-track front suspension. The shocks are also improved, with the smooth action expected of modern oil-filled units.

==== Progress series ====
The "Progress 4WDS" was Kyosho's first electric 4WD off-road racer. The motor was mounted on the rear overhang, and the forward wheel moves with a chain extending from the rear gearbox. This chain system was also tried on the on-road racer, "Fantom EP." The rear suspension was an orthodox double trailing arm and oil damper with coil springs, but the front suspension featured a double wishbone and mono damper, and substituted a torsion bar for a spring. This unique front suspension was rather difficult to set up, and had a short arm, which prevented it from taking powerful strokes.

The front wheel on the 4WS series could only move in the opposite direction as the rear wheel, and turning wide curves was also difficult with this series.

Adjustments were made with each successive model, but the Progress series became infamous as a slow car unable to live up to its full potential. Kyosho's first series of 4WDs was too heavy and clumsy to compete in serious RC racing.

- Progress 4WDS
- Gallop 4WDS
- Gallop MKII

==== Optima series ====
This was Kyosho's highly successful series of 4WD off-road racers. Many of the models gained widespread popularity in off-road RC racing.

Notable models (in order of release)

- Optima (a 4WD buggy with a chain drive system. Uses an aluminum ladder frame)
- Javelin (uses the same frame, but was equipped with a frame-like body. Some parts, including the damper stay, became optional parts)
- Gold Optima (this limited model was released after the 100,000th Optima was sold. 10,000 of this model were produced. The name comes from the gold colored anodic coating) used on many of its parts.
- Turbo Optima (sections were strengthened to allow an 8.4V battery to be used. Equipped with a Le Mans 240S motor and ball bearings)
- Salute (a Turbo Optima with a different body. The motor was sold separately, resulting in a cheaper overall cost)
- Optima Pro 4WD (the last Optima to use a chain drive system. Uses an amp (ESC))
- Optima Mid (all of the Optima models below are belt drive models. The location of the motor was changed from the rear overhang to an RMR layout. The frame was made of duralumin and fibre-reinforced plastic)
- Turbo Optima Mid (the upper echelon of the Optima Mid series. Sold with several optional parts)
- Turbo Optima Mid SE
- Turbo Optima Mid Special (the wheelbase of the Optima Mid was extended, and was sold with a carbon fiber frame. Only a maximum of two were shipped per store, as it was a limited model)
- Optima Mid Custom (a low priced version of the Turbo Optima Mid special. The frame is made of duralmin)
- Optima Mid Custom Special (similar to the Turbo Optima Mid special, with the LWB duralumin frame (some were confirmed to have been produced with the carbon fiber frame), but the body was changed to a "bullet type" canopy body)

==== Ultima series ====
The 2WD racing buggy created following the Tomahawk. The double wishbone suspension and aluminum monocoque frame gave the buggy far more speed than previous models. The car won 1st place in the 2nd electric off-road 2WD world tournament held in England in 1987.

- Ultima (a 2WD buggy created in the style of the Optima series)
- Turbo Ultima (: duralmin flat pan frame, white color, special "Platinum Shocks" with graphite shock towers and full ball bearings. Ball differential and motor guard. )
- Ultima Pro ( fibre-reinforced plastic frame, Gold shocks, full ball bearings, Ball differential, motor guard, adjustable tie rods, stick or saddle pack battery configuration. )
- Ultima Pro XL (Similar to the Ultima Pro but with a single plate chassis. Longer front and rear suspension arms. Adjustable rear toe in and 48 pitch spur and pinion gears.)
- Ultima II and Turbo Ultima II (The Ultima II was a basic Ultima for beginners. The Turbo Ultima II had Gold shocks, full bearings and ball differential. Both models had the new Kyosho "Kelron" chassis.)
- Outlaw Ultima ST (The only Stadium truck made from the original Ultima II chassis. Kelron chassis and aluminum front shock towers with long shocks. Ford Ranger body came with the kit.)
- Triumph
- Pro X (the first edition had a problem with the ball differential, but was fixed in the second release)
- Ultima RB (appeared for the first time in the 1999 world championship. The Type-R model was geared towards competitions, while the sport model was designed for beginners)
- Ultima RB Type-R Evolution (the Ultima RB Type-R with optional parts included)
- Ultima RB5 (released in March, 2007)
- Ultima RB5 SP (released in May, 2009)
- Ultima RB5 SP2 (released in April, 2010 featuring a new rear end and body)
- Ulitma RT5 (2WD truck released in September, 2009)
- Ultima SC (2WD CORR truck released in February, 2010)
- Ultima SCR (2WD truck released in 2011)
- Ultima RB6 (2WD Electric Buggy, Released Oct. 2012)
- Ultima RB6.6 (2wd Electric Buggy, Released May. 2015)
- Ultima RB7 (2WD Electric Buggy, Released August. 2018)
- Ultima RB7SS (Stock Spec. 2WD Electric Buggy, Released July. 2019)

==== Lazer series ====
A series started with the "Lazer ZX", which became the basic model for the Optima series. It evolved from "Lazer ZX-R" to "Lazer ZX Sport," "Lazer ZX-RR, "Lazer ZX-S," "Lazer ZX-S Evolution"(note : limited Lazer ZX-S models have been sold, and most of them in Japan, making them the hardest to find of the Lazer series) and later versions called the "Lazer Alpha" (starter car with many ABS parts), "Lazer 2000" (kelron parts). The body design for the Lazer ZX was rather unpopular from the start, and many users, including the Kyosho racing team, preferred to use the bodyset from the Turbo Optima Mid Special. The current model, "Lazer ZX-5" has a similar name, but bears a completely different design from its predecessors. It employs a shaft-driven 4WD system rather than the belt-driven system of its predecessors, a longitudinally mounted motor, and a new low-profile body. In 2011, June, there was available Kyosho ZX-5 FS2, and ZX-5 RTR. The ZX-5 has been a huge success at racing in Europe and North-America. The original kit has been upgraded from FS to FS2 featuring lipo ready chassis, new body and a new rear end. The FS2 has since been upgraded again to FS2 SP specification with the inclusion of big bore shock absorbers and other minor changes. Kyosho later stopped producing the Lazer ZX-5 lineup, in favour of their new model, the Lazer ZX6, created and sold in 2014. It featured a new, improved, big-bore suspension system, a new, made from aluminium, chassis and new shock towers. An improved version of the laser ZX6, the laser ZX-6.6, was created in 2016, featuring minor changes. Although the ZX5 FS2 SP and ZX6 models were different, some (if not most) parts were interchangeable between them like the gear boxes, the shafts, and even the shock towers with some modifications. In 2019, 3 years after the ZX 6.6's release, kyosho introduced the latest model of the Lazer lineup, the Lazer ZX-7 which featured a new 7075 aluminium made chassis with improved rigidity, a new floating resin servo mount and a new sliding motor mount. Since 2021, the Lazer ZX-7 has been out of stock and listed 'undecided' on Kyosho's website, and it's debatable whether or not, Kyosho will release a new competition designed Lazer-series buggy. Despite that, Kyosho announced in April 2024, a bash-racing type buggy of the Lazer series named Lazer SB. The Lazer SB is based on the Lazer ZX-5 platform and it is believed by some to be the Re-Release of the Lazer ZX-5. The Launch date is set to be in June 2024. Here is a list with all the Lazer series models (in chronological order) :

- Lazer ZX, released in 1989
- Lazer ZX-Sport, released in 1992
- Lazer ZX-R, released in 1992
- Lazer ZX ALPHA, released in 1992
- Lazer ZX-RR (ZX-R Mk2), released in 1994
- Lazer ZXS, released in 1997 (Limited Production)
- Lazer 2000, released in 1999
- Lazer ZX-S Evo, released in 2000 (Limited Production)
- Unreleased Prototype (Presumably a prototype of the Lazer ZX-5 which appeared in IFMAR WORLDS 2003. The buggy is belt-driven and has the Lazer ZX-RR's arms and a new-type of big-bore shocks)
- Lazer ZX-5, released in 2005
- Lazer ZX-5 SP, released in 2007
- Lazer ZX-5 FS (Firestrike), released in 2008
- Lazer ZX-5 FS2, released in 2010
- Lazer ZX-5 FS2 SP, released in 2011
- Lazer ZX-6, released in 2014
- Lazer ZX-6.6, released in 2016
- Lazer ZX-7, released in 2019
- Lazer SB, to be released in June 2024 (Based on the Lazer ZX-5 platform)

== Die-Cast Cars ==
Since 1992, Kyosho has specialized in creating high end collector's grade Die-Cast Car Replicas. Kyosho offers a wide array of scale replicas and car makers. Kyosho's main competition comes from companies such as AUTOart, Minichamps, and Hot Wheels. Kyosho is also the official manufacturer of BMW Authorized scale replicas sold exclusively through BMW Dealerships. As of January 2008, their online catalogue includes approximately 1000 die cast cars and accessories.

== Radio controlled aircraft ==
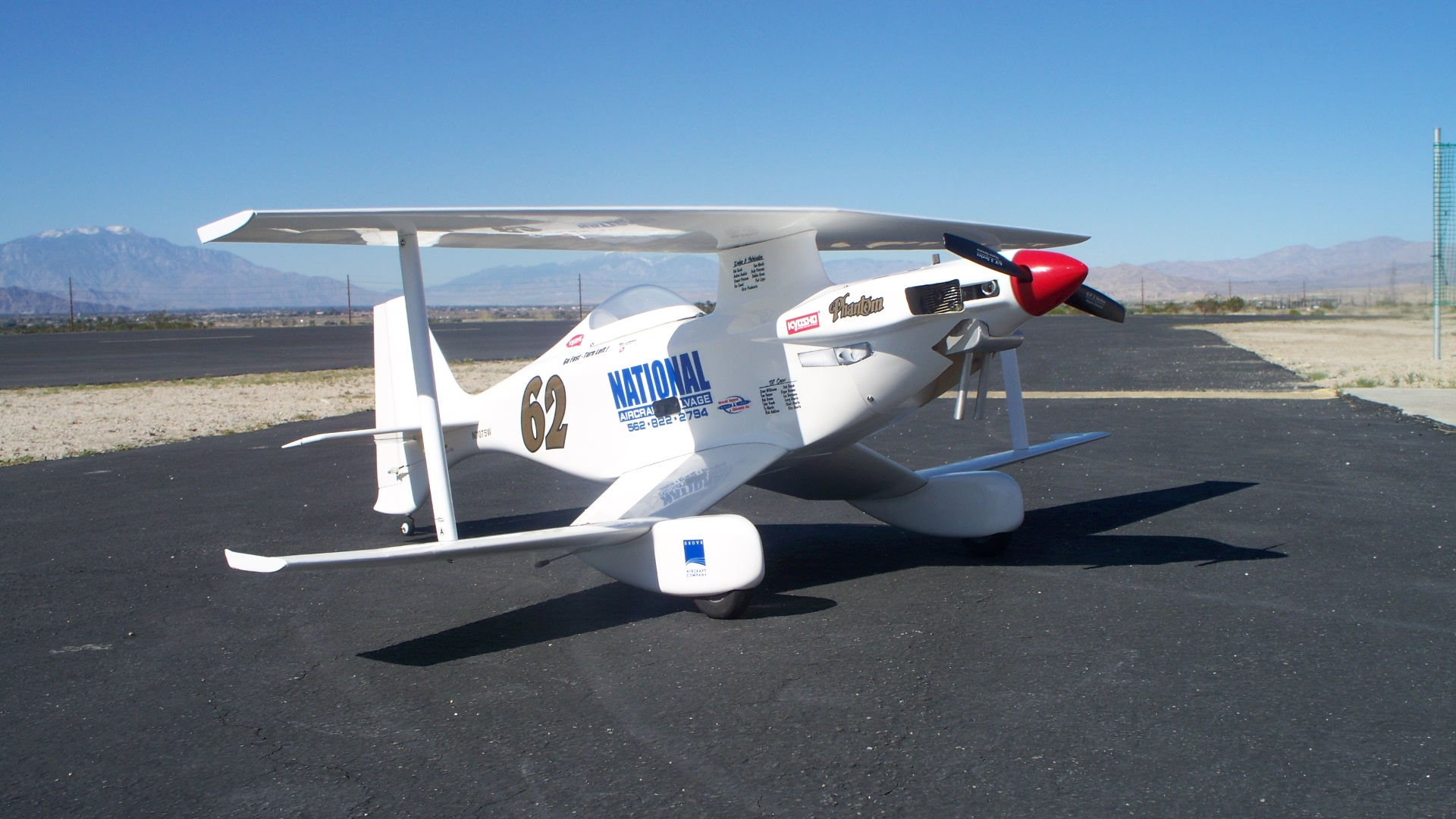
Radio controlled replica of the Aberle Phantom wearing the 2007 Kyosho sponsorship decals found on the full-scale version that year

The 2000s saw a shift toward the growing hobby of radio controlled model aircraft and the creation of almost ready-to-fly models. One such model, the "Phantom 70," is a quarter-scale replica of the Aberle Phantom biplane. Based in Fallbrook, California USA, the full-scale Phantom was built by Aberle Custom Aircraft and sponsored by Kyosho during the 2007 Reno Air Races. The plane set a biplane-class speed record in 2004 with a top speed of more than 241 mph. A new record was established in 2006 with a speed of 251.958 mph.

== Potential for renewed production ==
Since rival company Tamiya renewed the production of popular classic models such as the "Frog," "Grasshopper," "Hornet," and "Hotshot," many fans hope for Kyosho to do the same with its own classics. However, the company has already gotten rid of most of the old frame casts, making prospects of renewed production costly and difficult.

During the Shizuoka Hobby Show in May, 2006, Kyosho introduced "Optima" and "Turbo Scorpion" in its new "Miniature Racing Buggy series". Though only 10 cm in length, these die-cast pullback toys feature exactly the same package design as the original RC kits.
