= IFMAR 1:10 Electric Off-Road World Championships =

Competition for radio-controlled model cars

IFMAR 1:10 Electric Off-Road World Championship
- First race: 1985
- Duration: 3 rounds of 5 minute heats (A-main); 1 round of 5 minute heat (others)
- Most wins (driver): 2WD = Masami Hirosaka (3); 4WD = Masami Hirosaka (4)
- Most wins (manufacturer): 2WD = Team Associated (13); 4WD = Yokomo (7)

Circuit information
- Surface: Dirt (1985–1991, 1995, 2002, 2005); Clay (1993, 1997–1999, 2007–2011, 2023); Blue groove (2003, 2013); Artificial turf (2015)

The IFMAR World Championship for 1:10th Electric Off-Road Cars (officially "IFMAR 1:10 Electric Off-Road World Championship") is a world championship radio controlled car race sanctioned by the International Federation of Model Auto Racing (IFMAR). It takes place biennially on odd years since 1987 in its current format but inaugurated in 1985 as a championship for Stock (stock handout motor) and Modified class (modified motors and seven cells) It is considered by the radio-controlled modelling industry to be the most prestigious event in the calendar that a number of mainstream hobby and toy brands have fielded factory entries.

The event is open exclusively to 1:10 scale electric off-road buggies with those of 2WD and 4WD drivetrain, competing separately. These are characterized by its large wheels designed for off-road driving and enclosed single-seater bodyshell with large rear spoiler.

Despite taking place under the same host and venue, the two championships are regarded as separate events, therefore in between them, the circuit is required to be rebuilt and reconfigured differently.

All the world championships took place on dirt or clay tracks until 2015 when the decision was made to run controversially on artificial turf.

In the 2WD class Associated Electrics, holds distinction for the most wins for manufacturers with a total of 13; Masami Hirosaka of Japan, hold the record with three wins. In the 4WD class Yokomo holds distinction for the most wins for manufacturers; Hirosaka, holding the record with three wins.

== Venues ==
Host Venues for the IFMAR 1:10 Electric Off-Road World Championship
Host Venues for the IFMAR 1:10 Electric Off-Road World Championship

Ed.	Year	Bloc	! Host Club	Venue	Location	Country	Surface	Source
1	1985	ROAR	Ranch Pit Shop	Ranch Pit Shop	Del Mar, San Diego, California	United States	Hardpack	
2	1987	EFRA	Romsey Off-Road Club	Malthouse Inn	Timsbury, Hampshire (Note: Numerous sources promoted the event as taken place in Romsey.)	United Kingdom	Dirt	
3	1989	FEMCA	St Ives Off Road Radio Control Car Club	St. Ives Showground	St Ives, New South Wales	Australia	Dirt	
4	1991	ROAR	Team SEMROCC Racing	Freedom Hill Park	Sterling Heights, Michigan (Note: Numerous sources promoted the event as taken place in Detroit.)	United States	Dirt	
5	1993	EFRA	Thames Estuary Model Auto Circuits	Pipps Hill Leisure Complex	Basildon, Essex	United Kingdom	Dirt	
6	1995	FEMCA	JMRCA Kanto	Yatabe Arena	Tsukuba, Ibaraki	Japan	Dirt	
7	1997	ROAR	Ranch Pit Shop	Ranch Pit Shop	Pomona, California	United States	Blue Groove	
8	1999	EFRA	Rauman Urheiluautoilijat	Uimahalli	Rauma, Satakunta	Finland	Dirt	
N/A	2001	FAMAR	DELAYED TO 2002		Pretoria, Gauteng	South Africa	Dirt	
9	2002	FAMAR	Tshwane Raceway And Promotions	Skilpad Tortoise Hall	Pretoria, Gauteng (Note: Because of the September 11 attacks which occurred prior to the championships, the event was delayed until 2002. See also list of entertainment affected by the September 11 attacks.)	South Africa	Dirt	
10	2003	ROAR	Minnreg RC Car Club	Minnreg RC Speedway	Largo, Florida	United States	Blue Groove	
11	2005	EFRA	AF Model Rings	AF Model Rings	Collegno, Piedmont	Italy	Dirt	
12	2007	FEMCA	Hakusan Ichirino RC Club	Hakusan Arena	Ishikawa, Chūbu region	Japan	Dirt	
13	2009	FAMAR	Tshwane Raceway and Promotions	TRAP R/C Venue	Pretoria, Gauteng	South Africa	Dirt	
14	2011	EFRA	Vaasan Urheiluautoilijat	Pitkämäki Race-Centre	Vaasa, Ostrobothnia	Finland	Clay	
15	2013	ROAR	A-Main Hobbies	Silver Dollar R/C Raceway	Chico, California	United States	Blue Groove	
16	2015	FEMCA	JMRCA Kanto	Yatabe Arena	Tsukuba, Ibaraki	Japan	Astroturf	
17	2017	FEMCA	3-Circles	ARC International Raceway	Xiamen, Fujian	China	Dirt	
18	2019	EFRA	Hudy Arena	Hudy Arena	Trenčín, Trenčín Region	Slovakia	Clay	
19	2023	ROAR	Hobby Action	Hobby Action RC Raceway	Chandler, Arizona	United States		
20	2025	FEMCA	Hills Offroad RC Car Club		Castle Hill, New South Wales	Australia	Dirt	

== IFMAR World Championship Winners ==
Year	Name	Chassis		Electronics				Source	Report
Year	Name	Brand	Model	Motor	ESC	Transmitter	Batteries	Source	Report
Stock
1985	(United States) Jay Halsey	Associated	RC10	Reedy	Novak NESC-1	Airtronics			Report
Unlimited
1985	(United States) Gil Losi Jr.	Yokomo	YZ-834B	Trinity	Novak NESC-1	Airtronics			Report
2WD
1987	(United States) Joel Johnson	Kyosho	Ultima	Trinity Monster Pure Gold	Tekin ESC100	KO Propo EX-1	Trinity SC		Report
1989	(Japan) Masami Hirosaka	Associated	RC10GX	Reedy	KO Propo CX-III	KO Propo Esprit			Report
1991	(Japan) Masami Hirosaka	Associated	RC10GX	Reedy	Novak 410-M1c	KO Propo	Yokomo SCE		Report
1993	(United States) Brian Kinwald	Associated	RC10	Reedy	Novak 410-M1c	Airtronics CS2P			Report
1995	(United States) Matt Francis	Associated	RC10B2	Reedy Sonic	LRP ICS Digital	Airtronics Caliber 3Ps	Sanyo/Reedy/Orion		Report
1997	(United States) Brian Kinwald	Losi	XX-CR	Trinity	Novak Cyclone	Airtronics Caliber 3PS			Report
1999	(Japan) Masami Hirosaka	Associated	RC10B3	Reedy Sonic II (9x3)	GM Racing V12	KO Propo Esprit Vantage	Yokomo 2000mAh		Report
2002	(United States) Matt Francis	Losi	XXX	Trinity	LRP	Airtronics M8			Report
2003	(United States) Billy Easton	Associated	RC10B4	Reedy Rx	LRP QC2	Airtronics M8			Report
2005	(United Kingdom) Neil Cragg	Associated	RC10B4	Reedy Ti	Nosram Razor	KO Propo EX-10			Report
2007	(Japan) Hayato Matsuzaki	Associated	RC10B4	Checkpoint	KO Propo VFS-1 Pro Competition 3	KO Propo EX-10 Helios C2			Report
2009	(Germany) Martin Achter	Associated	RC10B4	CS Magnetic Delta	CS Rocket Competition	Sanwa M11X			Report
2011	(United States) Ryan Cavalieri	Associated	RC10B4.1	Team Orion Vortex VST Pro	LRP SXX	Airtronics M11X			Report
2013	(United States) Jared Tebo	Kyosho	Ultima RB6	Team Orion Vortex VST2	Team Orion Vortex R10	KO Propo EX-10 Eurus			Report
2015	(United States) Spencer Rivkin	Associated	RC10B5M	Reedy Sonic Mach 2	Reedy Blackbox 410R	Airtronics M12S			Report
2017	(United States) Ryan Maifield	Yokomo	YZ-2 DTM	Team Orion Vortex VST2	Team Orion HMX	Airtronics M12S			Report
2019	(United States) Spencer Rivkin	Associated	RC10B6.1DL	HobbyWing XeRun V10 G3	HobbyWing XeRun XR10 Pro Elite	Futaba 7PX			Report
2023	(United States) Michael “Tater” Sontag	TLR	22 5.0 DC ELITE	HobbyWing G3 7.0T	Fantom Pro 2.0	M12S	Protek 4800mAh		Report
2025	(United States) Broc Champlin	Schumacher	Cougar LD3	Hobbywing Xerun V10 G3 8.0T	Hobbywing Xerun XR10 Pro G3	Sanwa M17 / PowerHD GTS-3			Report
4WD
1987	(Japan) Masami Hirosaka	Schumacher	CAT XL	HPI UNO Blue Label	KO Propo CX-I	KO Propo Esprit	UNO		Report
1989	(Japan) Masami Hirosaka	Yokomo	YZ-870C	Reedy	KO Propo CX-III	KO Propo Esprit			Report
1991	(United States) Cliff Lett	Yokomo	YZ-10 Works'91	Reedy Mr. M	Novak 410-M1c	Airtronics	Reedy		Report
1993	(Japan) Masami Hirosaka	Yokomo	YZ-10 WC Special	Reedy	Novak 410-HPc	KO Propo Esprit II	Sanyo		Report
1995	(United States) Mark Pavidis	Yokomo	YZ-10	Reedy Sonic	LRP ICS Digital	Airtronics CS2P	Sanyo		Report
1997	(Japan) Masami Hirosaka	Yokomo	MX-4	Reedy	Tekin M-Star Red	KO Propo Esprit Vantage	Yokomo		Report
1999	(Finland) Jukka Steenari	Losi	XX-4	Orion Chrome	Novak Cyclone	Sanwa M8	Orion V-Max		Report
2002	(Finland) Jukka Steenari	Losi	XX-4	Orion	Novak	Sanwa M8	Orion		Report
2003	(United States) Ryan Cavalieri	Losi	XXX-4	Trinity D5	Novak GTX	Airtronics M8	Trinity		Report
2005	(United States) Ryan Cavalieri	JConcepts	BJ4 Worlds Ed.	Trinity Epic Shock	LRP QC3	Airtronics M11	Trinity		Report
2007	(United States) Jared Tebo	Associated	RC10B44	Checkpoint	LRP QC3	Futaba 3PK Super	Autopoint		Report
2009	(Germany) Martin Achter	Team Durango	DEX410	CS Magnetic Delta	CS Rocket Competition	Sanwa M11X			Report
2011	(United States) Ryan Cavalieri	Associated	RC10B44.1	Orion Vortex VST Pro	Orion Vortex R10 Pro	Airtronics M11X	Orion CBN Pro 5500 90Deg Saddle Lipo		Report
2013	(United States) Steven Hartson	Associated	RC10B44.2	LRP Vector X20	LRP Flow WorksTeam	Futaba 4PKS-R			Report
2015	(Portugal) Bruno Coelho	XRay	XB4 16	LRP Vector X20	LRP Flow WorksTeam	Sanwa M12S	LRP		Report
2017	(United States) Ryan Maifield	Yokomo	YZ-4 SF	Team Orion VST2	Team Orion HMX	Sanwa M12S	Orion		Report
2019	(Portugal) Bruno Coelho	Xray	XB4 20	HobbyWing XeRun V10 G3	HobbyWing XeRun XR10 Pro Elite	Sanwa M17			Report
2023	(Italy) Davide Ongaro	Associated	RC10B74.2	Hobbywing v10 g3	Hobbywing xr10 G2s	Sanwa	Sunpadow		Report
2025	(Denmark) Marcus Kaerup	Associated	RC1084D	Hobbywing Xerun V10 G3 6.5T	Hobbywing Xerun XR10 Pro G3	Sanwa M17 / Savox SB3262SG	Team EAM 4200mAh		Report

== Significance to the other Worlds events ==
As it is considered by the industry to be the most prestigious event in radio-controlled modelling, in an attempt to "generate sale revenue from their products”, it has attracted some of the biggest brands from the hobby and toy industries that included Nikko, Tomy, Tamiya and Traxxas. Only the latter two had greater success at the A-mains with Tamiya achieving 2nd by Lee Martin in 2013 and Scott Montgomery's 8th for Traxxas in 1991, both in 2WD.

At the 1989 Worlds, it was claimed by Radio Control Car Action that virtually every manufacturers, who had a 1:10 buggy on the market, was represented. In a bid to add to their 1987 4WD Title; Schumacher, a title sponsor, handed out their latest 2wd car, the Top Cat, to any contender who was interested in representing them.

As a number of manufacturers spend a large sums of money to prepare their teams to ensure a win, as a result a number of those enforce secrecy to protect their prototypes from view. In one notable example, Team Associated, who was the only brand to field a prototype, refused to allow it to be photographed, covering their RC10 up with a towel on anybody who tried to and when forced an Australian team member to hand his film over as he managed to take a few shot of its exposed chassis during technical inspection. Losi in comparison managed to escape scrutiny as experimental two-speed transmission was kept secret and gave misleading answers to prying eyes. They switched to their conventional transmissions in the finals. By the time of the 1991 Worlds, this practice was enforced by a majority of manufacturers. This was in contrast to the 1986 IFMAR 1:8 IC Off-Road World Championship, when Japanese entrants from Kyosho clearly knew their outdated cars had little chance against their European competitors, freely took numerous photographs of their competitor's cars to benefit their research. The outcome became the Burns in late-1987 and then, at the turn of the decade came the highly successful Inferno series that dominated racing from then on.

To prepare for the 1989 event, Yokomo technicians famously collected soil sample on the track for analysis back in Japan. They were allegedly spotted by locals wheeling around the circuit, a cart that had a video camera mounted on it to get a car's eye view of the track. The result was a duplicate of the track that became the Yatabe Arena back home. Nowadays, regulation require the circuit to be altered at over 60% of its layout, had it been used prior to commencement date and closed for a 2-day minimum, 3-day maximum prior to then.

Good preparation is key to winning as opposed to accessibility to prototype arts as Associated learned in 1993; when they felt their standard issue, aluminium chassis RC10 was best suited to the circuit, mechanics proceeded to modify Brian Kinwald's chassis by rounding its square edges. Its suspension arms was molded from a more rigid graphite.

Teams and drivers are prepared to bend rules in an attempt to win. In 1989, Yokomo's TR-31 tires, only made available to Yokomo and Associated drivers, became a subject of scrutiny due to its size, given the speed its Yokomos and Associated were going.

The tires, were 2 1/4 inches tall (equivalent to 22 inch in full scale) which was illegal under ROAR regulation (maximum 2 inches) though IFMAR did not have such restrictions and was shipped in 30 boxes of tires from Japan. In comparison, Associated was quick to point out to the critics that at the 1987 Worlds, Kyosho fielded tires on its Ultima that was too wide for ROAR regulations.

Team Losi in retaliation, countered this by taking all the stops in the States to produce and ship over 100 pairs of oversize front tires, 200 pairs of rears and five sets of hand-machined aluminum wheels across the Pacific. The tires, only permitted on its JR-X2, ended with mixed results for drivers as the rim ended up being bent out of shape and discarded for Losi's standard wheel.

Some who attempted to bend the rules were not lucky such as at the 1993 Worlds; the electric motor of Ben Sturnham's Schumacher CAT 2000 was found with a hybrid motor illegal under IFMAR regulation regardless if it was compliant with the host country BRCA's regulations, his Tanaplan motor consisted of parts by other manufacturer of approved motors including Epic can and armature with Yokomo endbell. Sturnham had his 3rd-place finish demoted to a 10th place after all his lap times was removed despite protests by Tanaplan's Martin Finnesey that it offered no performance enhancement.CITEREFHowell1993

== Schedule ==
A maximum of 150 drivers take part, each continental blocs allocated 32 entries each, the host bloc an extra 10 and the final 10 allocated by IFMAR themselves; should any allocation be left unused, it would be reallocated to the remaining blocs. The event takes place over eight days in total with the first reserved for competitor's registration followed by its opening ceremony in the afternoon then the two sets of three days for competitions.

The competitions begin with a minimum of six practice rounds over groups of fifteen consisting of ten drivers each, starting with the less experienced, this determines the number of heats required and the minimum time needed between rounds. Each heat consists of drivers who are ranked in order of priority; final ranking in the previous Worlds, then those of each countries and the domestic entrants and additional entries. In this case, in the 2015 Worlds, debutants Spencer Rivkin and Bruno Coehlo started at the lower-to-mid practice group 6 and 11 respectively, whereas Steven Hartson, Jared Tebo, Naoto Matsukura and Lee Martin start together in group 15 as the former two are defending champions and the latter given their performance or seeding in their home blocs whereas Travis Amezcua and David Ronnefalk, despite appearing at the A-main once previously, starts in practice group 14. Usually the final rounds are used as controlled practice. At the 2015 Worlds, practice rounds consisted of four rounds of open practice and two rounds of seeding practice to group the drivers together by skill level. The second day of competition, following the second controlled practice, consists of four rounds of qualifying heats and for day three; the final qualifying session and race day. For each qualifying session, a group of up to ten cars start under the "staggered start" system (a driver each starting separately within of one second of being called).

After each 5 minute qualifying session, the best qualifier of the round is awarded zero points, 2 and 3 points for the 2nd and 3rd fastest qualifier and so on with the most points given to the slowest qualifier. Of five rounds in total, the best three overall performances (as opposed to lap times in full-sized motorsport) counts toward the driver's overall performance, two best rounds count toward three or four rounds completed and one round count toward two or one rounds. After all the points are totaled up, the driver with the fewest points is the best qualifier, thus is awarded a TQ (Top Qualifier) spot, enabling them to start in front of each round. Should they tie in points with another driver, the one with the lowest points score of the three is used to break the tie, if this fails, then the next set of points will be used until the tie is broken. If the points fail to break the tie, then the driver's laps and time from the lowest score will be used.

The groups are then split into ten groups of ten drivers in alphabets, pending on their performance in qualifying with A being the fastest of the groups Race day starts with the slowest groups first, working its way to the next faster groups up to the fastest, the A-main, then progresses to the 2nd heat. Each race runs for a total of five minutes with extra time to allow the driver to complete their laps. Only the A-main, the group that carries the only hope of taking the world championship title, has three heats with only two best performances that counts and a final practice in the afternoon during race day and the rest run under a single 5 minute heat.

Following the conclusion of the first championship, the event will have an off day as the circuit would have to be rebuilt and reconfigured to a different layout required by IFMAR regulations as accordingly the two Worlds are considered to be a separate events. The practice would instead start with drivers who are ranked according to their performance in 2WD the day before.

== Statistics ==
=== Multiple Champions ===
==== 2WD ====
Rank	Driver	Wins
1	(Japan) Masami Hirosaka	3
2	(United States) Brian Kinwald	2
2	(United States) Matt Francis	2
2	(United States) Spencer Rivkin	2

==== 4WD ====
Rank	Driver	Wins
1	(Japan) Masami Hirosaka	4
2	(United States) Ryan Cavalieri	3
3	(Finland) Jukka Steenari	2
3	(Portugal) Bruno Coelho	2

=== Winning Equipment ===
==== Car manufacturers ====
===== 2WD =====
Rank	Manufacturer	Wins
1	(United States) Team Associated	12
2	(United States) Team Losi	3
3	(Japan) Kyosho	2
4	(Japan) Yokomo	1
4	(United Kingdom) Schumacher	1
	Total	19

===== 4WD =====
Rank	Manufacturer	Wins
1	(Japan) Yokomo	6
2	(United States) Team Associated	5
3	(United States) Team Losi	3
4	(Slovakia) XRAY	2
4	(United Kingdom) Schumacher	2
6	(United States) JConcepts	1
6	(United Kingdom) Team Durango	1
6	(United Kingdom) Schumacher	1
	Total	19

==== Motors ====
===== 2WD =====
Rank	Manufacturer	Wins
1	(United States) Reedy	8
2	(China) HobbyWing	3
2	(Switzerland) Team Orion	3
2	(United States) Trinity	3
6	(United States) Team Checkpoint	1
6	(Germany) CS Electronic	1

===== 4WD =====
Rank	Manufacturer	Wins
1	(United States) Reedy	5
2	(Switzerland) Team Orion	4
3	(China) HobbyWing	3
4	(Germany) LRP Electronic	2
4	(United States) Trinity	2
6	(United States) HPI	1
6	(United States) Team Checkpoint	1
6	(Germany) CS Electronic	1

==== ESC ====
===== 2WD =====
Rank	Manufacturer	Wins
1	(Germany) LRP Electronic	4
2	(United States) Novak Electronics	3
3	(Japan) KO Propo	2
3	(Switzerland) Team Orion	2
3	(China) HobbyWing	2
6	(Germany) CS Electronic	1
6	(Germany) GM Racing	1
6	(Germany) Nosram	1
6	Phantom	1
6	(United States) Reedy	1
6	(United States) Tekin	1

===== 4WD =====
Rank	Manufacturer	Wins
1	(United States) Novak Electronics	5
1	(Germany) LRP Electronic	5
3	(China) HobbyWing	3
4	(Japan) KO Propo	2
4	(Switzerland) Team Orion	2
6	(United States) Tekin	1
6	(Germany) CS Electronic	1

==== Transmitters ====
===== 2WD =====
Rank	Manufacturer	Wins
1	Airtronics	8
2	(Japan) KO Propo	7
3	(Japan) Sanwa	3
4	(Japan) Futaba	1

===== 4WD =====
Rank	Manufacturer	Wins
1	(Japan) Sanwa	8
2	Airtronics	5
3	(Japan) KO Propo	4
4	(Japan) Futaba	2

=== Winning Drivers ===
==== By Member Blocs (Drivers) ====
===== 2WD =====
Rank	Bloc	Wins
1	ROAR	12
2	FEMCA	4
3	EFRA	2
4	FAMAR	0

===== 4WD =====
Rank	Bloc	Wins
1	ROAR	8
2	EFRA	5
3	FEMCA	4
4	FAMAR	0

==== Win(s) by Nations (Drivers) ====
===== 2WD =====
Rank	Nation	Wins
1	United States	11
2	Japan	4
3	United Kingdom	1
3	Germany	1

===== 4WD =====
Rank	Nation	Wins
1	United States	9
2	Japan	4
3	Finland	2
3	Portugal	2
5	Germany	1

=== Most represented in final ===
Note: Italics on year represents in which a driver of the country or car manufacturer who failed to score a championship title, italics on nationalities indicate host nation.

==== Nations (drivers) ====
===== 2WD =====
Rank	Total	Nation	Year
1	9	United States	1985
1	9	United States	1995
1	9	United States	1997
1	9	United States	2003
5	8	United States	1993
5	8	United States	2001
7	7	United States	1989
7	7	United States	1993
7	7	United States	2005
7	7	South Africa	2009
11	6	United States	1999
11	6	United States	2007
13	5	United States	1987
13	5	United States	1991
13	5	United States	2011
13	5	United States	2013
13	5	United States	2015

===== 4WD =====
Rank	Total	Nation	Year
1	9	United States	1985
2	8	United States	1995
2	8	United States	2003
4	7	United States	1991
4	7	United States	1999
4	7	South Africa	2009
7	6	United States	2001
7	6	United States	2013
9	5	United States	1987
9	5	United States	1989
9	5	United States	1993
9	5	United States	1997
9	5	United States	2007

==== Car manufacturers ====
===== 2WD =====
Rank	Total	Nation	Year
1	8	(United States) Associated Electrics	1985
1	8	(United States) Associated Electrics	2007
3	7	(United States) Associated Electrics	2005
4	6	(United States) Team Losi	1997
5	5	(Japan) Kyosho	1987
5	5	(United States) Associated Electrics	1987
5	5	(United States) Associated Electrics	1989
5	5	(United States) Associated Electrics	1995
5	5	(United States) Team Losi	1995
5	5	(United States) Team Losi	1997
5	5	(United States) Associated Electrics	1997
5	5	(United States) Associated Electrics	2011

===== 4WD =====
Rank	Total	Nation	Year
1	8	(Japan) Yokomo	1995
1	8	(United States) Team Losi	1999
3	7	(Japan) Yokomo	1985
4	6	(Japan) Yokomo	1993
5	5	(Japan) Kyosho	1987
5	5	(Japan) Yokomo	1989
5	5	(Japan) Yokomo	1991
