= 1995 IFMAR 1:10 Electric Off-Road World Championships =

Sports event

Coordinates: 36.01230674089055°N 140.085128809476°E

Event Information
- Event Title: 1995 IFMAR 1:10 Electric Off-Road World Championships
- Dates run: 1995

Club Information
- Venue: Yatabe Arena
- Location: Tsukuba City,
- Host country: Japan

Vehicle Specification
- Class: 1:10 Electric Offroad Buggy

2wd Title
- First: Matt Francis (USA); Associated - RC10B2

4WD Title
- First: Mark Pavidis (USA); Yokomo - YZ-10

IFMAR has officially announced China as the host of the next 1:12 and 1:10 Electric Touring Car World Championships, 2026 seeing the two events being brought back together for the first time since South Africa in 2018.

The sixth IFMAR - 1:10 Electric Off-Road World Championship was held in Japan at the Yatabe Arena in Tsukuba City.

== 2WD Top-10 Equipment ==
			Qual.			A1		A2		A3		Total			Ref
Pos.	Driver	Car Maker	Laps	Time	Pos.	Pos.	Pts	Pos.	Pts	Pos.	Pts	Total	Disc	Nets	Ref
1	Matt Francis (USA)	Associated; RC10B2	14	5:15.94	1	1	10	1	10	10	1	21	1	20	
2	Masami Hirosaka (JPN)	Associated; RC10B2	14	5:16.29	2	6	5	2	9	1	10	24	5	19	
3	Derek Furutani (USA)	Losi; XX	14	5:21.88	9	3	8	4	7	2	9	24	7	17	
4	Mark Francis (USA)	Associated; RC10B2	14	5:20.37	5	5	6	3	8	3	8	22	6	16	
5	Mark Pavidis (USA)	Associated; RC10B2	14	5:18.68	4	2	9	8	3	7	4	16	3	13	
6	Barry Baker (USA)	Losi; XX	14	5:22.11	10	4	7	7	4	8	3	14	3	11	
7	Cliff Lett (USA)	Associated; RC10B2	14	5:20.56	6	7	4	6	5	6	5	14	4	10	
8	Jack Johnson (USA)	Losi; XX	14	5:21.37	8	8	3	9	2	5	6	11	2	9	
9	Greg Hodapp (USA)	Losi; XX	14	5:17.11	3	9	2	10	1	4	7	10	1	9	
10	Sohrab Tavakoli (USA)	Losi; XX	14	5:21.88	9	10	1	5	6	9	2	9	1	8	

== 2WD Top-10 Equipment ==
Res	Qualifying	Driver	Car	Nicads	Motor	Speed Controller	Front Tyre	Rear Tyre	Radio	Servo	Receiver	Bodyshell	Gear Ratio	Source
1	1	Matt Francis (USA)	Associated; RC10B2	Sanyo; Reedy/Orion 1700 SCRC	Reedy; Sonic 10 Double	LRP; ICS Digital	Losi; Full Radius Silver	Pro-Line; Squared Fuzzies	Airtronics; Caliber 3Ps	Airtronics; 94155		Stock	17/84	
2	2	Masami Hirosaka (JPN)	Associated; RC10B2	Sanyo; Yokomo 1700 SCRC	Reedy; 11 turn quint	Tekin; G-12	Yokomo; T-51	Yokomo; T-51	KO; 2 Stick	KO; PS-1012		Stock	18/81	
3	9	Derek Furutani (USA)	Losi; XX	Sanyo; World Class 1700 SCRC	Maxtec; 13 Double	Tekin; G-12	Yokomo; T-51	Yokomo; T-51	Sanwa; 3PS	KO; Propo 1002	KO	Jammin	21/84	
4	5	Mark Francis (USA)	Associated; RC10B2	Sanyo; Orion 1700 SCRC	Reedy; 10 Double	LRP; ICS Digital	Losi; Full Radius Silver	Pro-Line; Squared Fuzzies	Airtronics; Caliber 3Ps	Airtronics; 151		Stock	18/81	
5	4	Mark Pavidis (USA)	Associated; RC10B2	Sanyo; Orion 1700 SCRC	Reedy; 11 Turn quint	LRP; ICS Digital	Yokomo; T-51	Yokomo; T-51	Airtronics; CS2P	Airtronics; 94155		Stock	19/81	
6	10	Barry Baker (USA)	Losi; XX	Sanyo; Keil Pushed 1700 SCRC	Maxtec; 12 Turn	Novak; Tempest	Yokomo; T-51	Yokomo; T-51	Airtronics; Caliber 3Ps	Airtronics; 94155		Jammin	22/84	
7	6	Cliff Lett (USA)	Associated; RC10B2	Sanyo; Reedy/Orion 1700 SCRC	Reedy; 11 Turn quint	LRP; ICS Digital	Losi; Full Radius Silver	Pro-Line; Squared Fuzzies	Sanwa; Caliber	Sanwa; 151		Stock	18/84	
8	7	Jack Johnson (USA)	Losi; XX	Sanyo; Trinity 1700 SCRC	Trinity; 12 Turn Double	Novak; Tempest	Yokomo; T-51	Yokomo; T-51	KO; R-756	KO; NES 4735		Jammin	19/84	
9	3	Greg Hodapp (USA)	Losi; XX	Sanyo; World Class 1700 SCRC	Maxtec; 12 Turn	Tekin; G-12	Yokomo; T-51	Yokomo; T-51	Airtronics; Caliber 3Ps	Airtronics; 94155		Jammin	19/84	
10	8	Sohrab Tavakoli (USA)	Losi; XX	Sanyo; Orion 1700 SCRC	Peak Performance; 12 Turn	Novak; Tempest	Yokomo; T-51	Yokomo; T-51	Airtronics; Caliber 3Ps	Airtronics; 94155		Jammin	19/84	

== 4WD Top-10 ==
			Qual.			A1		A2		A3		Total			Ref
Pos.	Driver	Car Maker	Laps	Time	Pos.	Pos.	Pts	Pos.	Pts	Pos.	Pts	Total	Disc	Nets	Ref
1	Mark Pavidis (USA)	Yokomo; YZ-10	14	5:00.50	2	3	8	1	10	2	9	27	8	19	
2	Brian Kinwald (USA)	Yokomo; YZ-10	15	5:21.24	1	4	7	4	7	1	10	24	7	17	
3	Masami Hirosaka (JPN)	Yokomo; YZ-10	14	5:01.82	5	1	10	9	2	4	7	19	2	17	
4	Mark Francis (USA)	Yokomo; YZ-10	14	5:03.62	8	2	9	5	6	6	5	20	5	15	
5	Jack Johnson (USA)	Yokomo; YZ-10	14	5:04.26	9	7	4	3	8	7	4	16	4	12	
6	Greg Hodapp (USA)	Kyosho; Lazer ZX-R	14	5:03.27	6	8	3	8	3	3	8	14	3	11	
7	Barry Baker (USA)	Yokomo; YZ-10	14	5:00.59	3	5	6	10	1	5	6	13	1	12	
8	Scott Brown (USA)	Yokomo; YZ-10	14	5:00.90	4	9	2	2	9	10	1	12	1	11	
9	Derek Furutani (USA)	Kyosho; Lazer ZX-R	14	5:04.30	10	5	6	7	4	9	2	12	2	10	
10	Patrick Feschtschenko (GER)	Yokomo; YZ-10	14	5:03.62	8	10	1	6	5	8	3	9	1	8	

== 4WD Top-10 Equipment ==
Res	Qualifying	Driver	Car	Nicads	Motor	Speed Controller	Front Tyre	Rear Tyre	Radio	Servo	Bodyshell	Gear Ratio	Source
1	2	Mark Pavidis (USA)	Yokomo; YZ-10	Sanyo; Reedy/Orion 1700 SCRC	Reedy; 10 Double	LRP; ICS Digital	Pro-Line; Squared Fuzzies	Pro-Line; Squared Fuzzies	Airtronics; CS2P	Airtronics; 94151	Yokomo	17/84	
2	1	Brian Kinwald (USA)	Yokomo; YZ-10	Sanyo; Trinity 1700 SCRC	Trinity; 11 Quad	LRP; ICS Digital	Pro-Line; Squared Fuzzies	Pro-Line; Squared Fuzzies	Airtronics; Caliber 3Ps	Airtronics; 94151	Yokomo	19/84	
3	5	Masami Hirosaka (JPN)	Yokomo; YZ-10	Sanyo; Yokomo 1700 SCRC	Reedy; 10 Double	Tekin; G-12	Pro-Line; Squared Fuzzies	Pro-Line; Squared Fuzzies	KO; 2-Stick	KO; PS-1012	Yokomo	17/84	
4	8	Mark Francis (USA)	Yokomo; YZ-10	Sanyo; Reedy/Orion 1700 SCRC	Reedy; 10 Double	LRP; ICS Digital	Pro-Line; Squared Fuzzies	Pro-Line; Squared Fuzzies	Airtronics; Caliber 3Ps	Airtronics; 94155	Yokomo	17/84	
5	9	Jack Johnson (USA)	Yokomo; YZ-10	Sanyo; Trinity 1700 SCRC	Trinity; 10 Double	Novak; Tempest	Pro-Line; Squared Fuzzies	Pro-Line; Squared Fuzzies	KO; R-756	KO; NES 4735	Yokomo	17/84	
6	6	Greg Hodapp (USA)	Kyosho; Lazer ZX-R	Sanyo; World Class 1700 SCRC	Maxtec; 12 Double	Tekin; G-12	Pro-Line; Squared Fuzzies	Pro-Line; Squared Fuzzies	Airtronics; Caliber 3Ps	Airtronics; 94151	Kyosho	20/87	
7	3	Barry Baker (USA)	Yokomo; YZ-10	Sanyo; Keil 1700 SCRC	Maxtec; 12 Double	Novak; Tempest	Pro-Line; Squared Fuzzies	Pro-Line; Squared Fuzzies	Airtronics; Caliber 3Ps	Airtronics; 94151	Yokomo	17/84	
8	4	Scott Brown (USA)	Yokomo; YZ-10	Sanyo; Trinity 1700 SCRC	Trinity; 11 Quint	Novak; Tempest	Pro-Line; Squared Fuzzies	Pro-Line; Squared Fuzzies	KO; Z-756	KO; NES 4735	Yokomo	17/84	
9	10	Derek Furutani (USA)	Kyosho; Lazer ZX-R	Sanyo; World Class 1700 SCRC	Maxtec; 12 Double	Tekin; G-12	Pro-Line; Squared Fuzzies	Pro-Line; Squared Fuzzies	Airtronics; Caliber 3Ps	KO; PS-1012	Kyosho	20/87	
10	7	Patrick Feschtschenko (GER)	Yokomo; YZ-10	Sanyo; Mega 1700 SCRC	Evolution; 11 Triple	Helbing	Pro-Line; Squared Fuzzies	Pro-Line; Squared Fuzzies	KO; EX-1	KO; PS-1002	Yokomo	17/84	
