= 2003 IFMAR 1:10 Electric Off-Road World Championships =

Event Information
- Event Title: 2003 IFMAR 1:10 Electric Off-Road World Championships
- Dates run: 10–15 October 2003

Club Information
- Venue: Minnreg
- Location: Largo,
- Host country: United States
- Surface: Clay (Blue Groove)

Vehicle Specification
- Class: 1:10 Electric Offroad Buggy

2wd Title
- First: Billy Easton (USA); Associated; RC10 B4
- Second: Brian Kinwald (USA); Losi; XXX
- Third: Mark Pavidis (USA); Associated; RC10 B4

4WD Title
- First: Ryan Cavalieri (USA); Losi; XXX4
- Second: Brian Kinwald (USA); Losi
- Third: Mike Truhe (USA); Losi

The 2003 IFMAR 1:10 Electric Off-Road World Championships was the tenth edition of the IFMAR 1:10 Electric Off-Road World Championship was held in Largo in the United States.

== 2WD Results ==
Pos.	Driver	Car	Qual.	Final
1	Billy Easton (USA)	Associated; RC10 B4		A-1
2	Brian Kinwald (USA)	Losi; XXX		A-2
3	Mark Pavidis (USA)	Associated; RC10 B4		A-3
4	Matt Francis (USA)	Losi; XXX		A-4
5	Lloyd Dassonville (USA)	Associated; RC10 B4		A-5
6	Jukka Steenari (FIN)	Losi; XXX		A-6
7	Jimmy Babcock (USA)	Losi; XXX		A-7
8	Joe Pillars (USA)	Losi; XXX		A-8
9	Jason Ruona (USA)	Associated; RC10 B4		A-9
10	Rick Hohwart (USA)	Losi; XXX		A-10

== 4WD Results ==
			Qual.	Final 1					Final 2					Final 3					Total
Pos.	Driver	Car	Qual.	Pos.	Laps	Time	FL	Pt.	Pos.	Laps	Time	FL	Pt.	Pos.	Laps	Time	FL	Pt.	Total	Lap	Time
1	Ryan Cavalieri (USA)	Losi; XXX4	2	1	14	5:17.92		1	2	14	5:19.23		2	1	14	5:19.71		1	2	42	15:56.86
2	Brian Kinwald (USA)	Losi	1	2	14	5:29.72		2	1	14	5:18.96		1	2	14	5:20.33		2	3	42	16:09.01
3	Mike Truhe (USA)	Losi	5	4	13	5:02.79		4	5	13	5:07.69		5	3	14	5:22.28		3	7	40	15:32.77
4	Gregg Hodapp (USA)	Losi	4	3	13	5:01.53		3	9	6	2:19.14		9	4	14	5:22.55		4	7	33	12:43.22
5	Markus Luebke (GER)	Losi	8	7	11	4:17.57		7	4	13	5:03.77		4	6	13	5:00.71			10	37	14:22.05
6	Jimmy Babcock (USA)	Losi	6	5	13	5:06.57		5	10	3	1:10.4		10	5	13	5:00.48		5	10	29	11:17.45
7	Richard Taylor (GBR)	Losi	10	8	9	3:32.15		8	3	13	5:01.79		3	10	13	5:07.73		10	11	35	13:41.67
8	Billy Easton (USA)	Yokomo; MR-4BC	7	6	13	5:09.07		6	6	13	5:08.1		6	8	13	5:01.98		8	12	39	15:19.15
9	Matt Francis (USA)	Losi	3	10	3	1:03.67		10	8	9	3:25.02		8	7	13	5:01.52		7	15	25	9:30.21
10	Jon Ringer (USA)	Losi	9	9	5	2:00.65		9	7	13	5:09.97		7	9	13	5:04.18		9	16	31	12:14.8
