= 2017 IFMAR 1:10 Electric Off-Road World Championships =

Radio controlled car race

Coordinates: 24.590135°N 117.992685°E

Event Information
- Event Title: 2017 IFMAR 1:10 Electric Off-Road World Championships
- Dates run: 11–18 November 2017

Club Information
- Venue: ARC International Raceway
- Location: Xiamen,
- Host country: China
- Surface: Dirt

Vehicle Specification
- Class: 1:10 Electric Offroad Buggy

2wd Title
- First: (United States) Ryan Maifield; Yokomo
- Second: (United States) Ryan Cavalieri; Associated
- Third: (United Kingdom) Lee Martin; Yokomo

4WD Title
- First: (United States) Ryan Maifield; Yokomo-Orion
- Second: (Sweden) David Ronnefalk; HB-Orion
- Third: (United States) Spencer Rivkin; Associated-Reedy

The 2017 IFMAR 1:10 Electric Off-Road World Championships was the seventeenth IFMAR 1:10 Electric Off-Road World Championship was held in Xiamen China between the 11–18 November 2017.

== Circuit ==
The Xiamen ARC International Raceway is situated in Xiamen. The newly constructed track is 42m wide by 35m deep designed by Lung Chuan Lee from Taiwan who also designed the onroad track layout in Beijing last year. The event was held on a dirt having that had been both glued and then sugared. The circuit has a purpose built building alongside. Housing on the first floor the drivers standing area, pits and tyre tech and on the second floor and a third floor for spectating for both the offroad track and on the other side of the building a high standard onroad track.

Racing was close and highly competitive but (United States) Ryan Maifield managed to secure both titles.

== Classification ==
Note: A-main only.

== 2WD Results ==
| | | | Qual. | Final 1 | | | | | Final 2 | | | | | Final 3 | | | | | Total | | | | | Ref. |
| Pos. | Driver | Car | Qual. | Pos. | Laps | Time | FL | Pt. | Pos. | Laps | Time | FL | Pt. | Pos. | Laps | Time | FL | Pt. | Total | Disc | Net | Lap | Time | Ref. |
|---|---|---|---|---|---|---|---|---|---|---|---|---|---|---|---|---|---|---|---|---|---|---|---|---|
| 1 | Ryan Maifield (USA) | Yokomo; YZ-2DTM | 1 | A-1 | 11 | 5:05.322 | 26.593 | 1 | 1 | 11 | 5:02.494 | 26.711 | 1 | 10 | DNS | | | 10 | 12 | 10 | 2 | 22 | 10:07.816 |
| 2 | Ryan Cavalieri (USA) | Associated | 3 | A-3 | 11 | 5:08.464 | 26.681 | 3 | 2 | 11 | 5:08.996 | 26.516 | 2 | 2 | 11 | 5:07.292 | 26.79 | 2 | 7 | 3 | 4 | 22 | 10:15.756 |
| 3 | Lee Martin (GBR) | Yokomo; YZ-2DTM | 2 | A-2 | 11 | 5:05.937 | 26.81 | 2 | 4 | 11 | 5:11.19 | 26.73 | 4 | 6 | 11 | 5:18.823 | 26.463 | 6 | 12 | 6 | 6 | 22 | 10:17.127 |
| 4 | Jared Tebo (USA) | Kyosho | 8 | A-5 | 11 | 5:15.968 | 27.112 | 5 | 3 | 11 | 5:09.27 | 26.934 | 3 | 3 | 11 | 5:09.529 | 26.839 | 3 | 11 | 5 | 6 | 22 | 10:18.799 |
| 5 | David Ronnefalk (SWE) | HB | 7 | A-10 | 9 | 4:41.437 | 27.292 | 10 | 6 | 11 | 5:14.088 | 26.834 | 6 | 1 | 11 | 5:06.518 | 27.094 | 1 | 17 | 10 | 7 | 22 | 10:20.606 |
| 6 | Dakotah Phend (USA) | Losi | 6 | A-4 | 11 | 5:12.83 | 27.081 | 4 | 10 | 11 | 5:23.325 | 26.312 | 10 | 4 | 11 | 5:13.352 | 26.804 | 4 | 18 | 10 | 8 | 22 | 10:26.182 |
| 7 | Joern Neumann (GER) | Associated | 9 | A-9 | 11 | 5:28.508 | 26.442 | 9 | 5 | 11 | 5:12.271 | 26.877 | 5 | 7 | 11 | 5:19.706 | 27.271 | 7 | 21 | 9 | 12 | 22 | 10:31.977 |
| 8 | Michal Orlowski (POL) | Schumacher; Cougar KC | 4 | A-8 | 11 | 5:25.54 | 27.825 | 8 | 9 | 11 | 5:22.841 | 26.307 | 9 | 5 | 11 | 5:16.746 | 27.046 | 5 | 22 | 9 | 13 | 22 | 10:39.587 |
| 9 | Kyle Ward-McBride (AUS) | Associated | 10 | A-6 | 11 | 5:21.21 | 27.711 | 6 | 7 | 11 | 5:16.375 | 27.049 | 7 | 8 | 11 | 5:21.237 | 27.228 | 8 | 21 | 8 | 13 | 22 | 10:37.585 |
| 10 | Bruno Coelho (POR) | X-Ray | 5 | A-7 | 11 | 5:23.568 | 27.337 | 7 | 8 | 11 | 5:19.268 | 26.021 | 8 | 9 | 11 | 5:27.504 | 26.599 | 9 | 24 | 9 | 15 | 22 | 10:42.836 | - |

| | | | Qual. | Finals | | | | Ref. |
| Pos. | Driver | Car | Qual. | Pos. | Laps | Time | FL | Ref. |
|---|---|---|---|---|---|---|---|---|
| 11 | Ty Tessmann (CAN) | X-Ray; XB2 2018 | 11 | B-1 | 11 | 5:10.683 | 26.822 |
| 12 | Dustin Evans (USA) | | 12 | B-2 | 11 | 5:12 | 27.024 |
| 13 | Naoto Matsukura (JPN) | | 13 | B-3 | 11 | 5:12.584 | 26.9 |
| 14 | Yusuke Sugiura (JPN) | | 14 | B-4 | 11 | 5:17.437 | 27.506 |
| 15 | Christopher Sturdy (AUS) | | 15 | B-5 | 11 | 5:18.965 | 26.238 |
| 16 | Daniel Kobbevik (NOR) | | 18 | B-6 | 11 | 5:22.715 | 27.579 |
| 17 | Spencer Rivkin (USA) | | 16 | B-7 | 11 | 5:22.751 | 26.722 |
| 18 | Brent Thielke (USA) | | 17 | B-8 | 10 | 5:02.579 | 27.776 |
| 19 | Kohta Akimoto (JPN) | Kyosho; RB6.6 | 20 | B-9 | 10 | 5:03.366 | 27.599 |
| 20 | Renaud Savoya (FRA) | | 19 | B-10 | 10 | 5:19.591 | 27.936 |
| 21 | Hubert Honigl (AUT) | | 21 | C-1 | 11 | 5:12.766 | 27.917 |
| 22 | Patrick Hofer (SUI) | | 23 | C-2 | 11 | 5:19.675 | 28.068 |
| 23 | Karel Novotny (CZE) | | 26 | C-3 | 11 | 5:22.701 | 27.883 |
| 24 | Billy Easton (USA) | | 28 | C-4 | 11 | 5:25.406 | 27.388 |
| 25 | Raymond Munday (AUS) | | 29 | C-5 | 11 | 5:28.436 | 28.177 |
| 26 | Martin Bayer (CZE) | | 22 | C-6 | 10 | 5:02.129 | 27.873 |
| 27 | Atsushi Hara (JPN) | | 24 | C-7 | 10 | 5:04.3 | 27.773 |
| 28 | Joshua Pain (AUS) | | 30 | C-8 | 10 | 5:04.956 | 27.693 |
| 29 | Kaito Kodera (JPN) | | 25 | C-9 | 10 | 5:05.279 | 26.767 |
| 30 | Hayato Matsuzaki (JPN) | | 27 | C-10 | 10 | 5:17.059 | 28.094 |
| 31 | Tanner Denney (USA) | | 37 | D-1 | 11 | 5:15.552 | 26.95 |
| 32 | Mitchell Steer (AUS) | | 31 | D-2 | 11 | 5:23.297 | 26.89 |
| 33 | Clément Boda (FRA) | | 40 | D-3 | 11 | 5:29.442 | 27.547 |
| 34 | Shuji Nishio (JPN) | | 35 | D-4 | 10 | 5:01.363 | 27.13 |
| 35 | Tom Cockerill (GBR) | | 36 | D-5 | 10 | 5:04.02 | 28.237 |
| 36 | Kazuki Sasatsu (JPN) | | 39 | D-6 | 10 | 5:04.109 | 27.16 |
| 37 | Shinnosuke Adachi (JPN) | | 34 | D-7 | 10 | 5:04.2 | 27.876 |
| 38 | Paul Crompton (GBR) | | 33 | D-8 | 10 | 5:11.798 | 27.051 |
| 39 | Cameron Zammit (AUS) | | 38 | D-9 | 10 | 5:14.715 | 28.412 |
| 40 | Mathieux Chaffardon (FRA) | | 32 | D-10 | 10 | 5:15.584 | 28.03 |
| 41 | Derek Wood (USA) | | 44 | E-1 | 11 | 5:20.571 | 27.93 |
| 42 | Frederik Hovgaard (DEN) | | 42 | E-2 | 11 | 5:28.347 | 28.594 |
| 43 | Ezekiel M. Ballinger (USA) | | 46 | E-3 | 10 | 5:06.036 | 28.211 |
| 44 | Felix Law (HKG) | | 45 | E-4 | 10 | 5:08.171 | 28.964 |
| 45 | Kouki Kato (JPN) | | 43 | E-5 | 10 | 5:10.07 | 28.159 |
| 46 | Shane O'Connor (NZL) | | 41 | E-6 | 10 | 5:13.899 | 29.205 |
| 47 | Anthony Campbell (AUS) | | 50 | E-7 | 10 | 5:18.158 | 28.99 |
| 48 | Andrew Smolnik (USA) | | 47 | E-8 | 9 | 4:46.37 | 28.789 |
| 49 | Matt Kellett (AUS) | | 48 | E-9 | 9 | 4:48.473 | 28.884 |
| 50 | Wei Ping Hu (CHN) | | 49 | E-10 | 9 | 4:53.847 | 29.468 |
| 51 | Yui Kaino (JPN) | | 57 | F-1 | 10 | 5:11.828 | 28.688 |
| 52 | Mike Walker (USA) | | 60 | F-2 | 10 | 5:12.694 | 28.394 |
| 53 | Christopher Mitchell (AUS) | | 53 | F-3 | 10 | 5:13.186 | 28.763 |
| 54 | Youngju Kim (KOR) | | 54 | F-4 | 10 | 5:17.5 | 29.959 |
| 55 | Fabian Luca Widmer (SUI) | | 51 | F-5 | 10 | 5:17.768 | 27.608 |
| 56 | Jerome Treignier (CAN) | | 56 | F-6 | 10 | 5:19.913 | 28.963 |
| 57 | Changsu Si (KOR) | | 59 | F-7 | 10 | 5:30.118 | 29.888 |
| 58 | Andrew Selvaggi (AUS) | | 58 | F-8 | 9 | 5:00.031 | 29.105 |
| 59 | Mansoon Yim (KOR) | | 55 | F-9 | 7 | 5:42.964 | 29.209 |
| 60 | Nathan Ralls (GBR) | | 52 | F-10 | 2 | 5:08.782 | 30.183 |
| 61 | Daeyoon Jung (KOR) | | 67 | G-1 | 10 | 5:12.115 | 29.188 |
| 62 | Lachlan Munday (AUS) | | 63 | G-2 | 10 | 5:16.421 | 29.556 |
| 63 | Minsu Si (KOR) | | 61 | G-3 | 10 | 5:18.107 | 28.9 |
| 64 | Dominic Quek (SGP) | | 66 | G-4 | 10 | 5:19.975 | 29.064 |
| 65 | Jarrod Smith (AUS) | | 70 | G-5 | 10 | 5:26.853 | 29.38 |
| 66 | Stickking Stickking (HKG) | | 68 | G-6 | 10 | 5:31.231 | 30.094 |
| 67 | Sven Rudig (AUT) | | 65 | G-7 | 9 | 5:01.282 | 30.876 |
| 68 | Martin Owen (GBR) | | 69 | G-8 | 9 | 5:06.488 | 31.009 |
| 69 | Jonathan Yeung (HKG) | | 62 | G-9 | 9 | 5:23.058 | 29.418 |
| 70 | Kim Kiheung (KOR) | | 64 | G-10 | DNS | :00 |
| 71 | Kai-Ya Wei (TPE) | | 71 | H-1 | 10 | 5:15.312 | 29.836 |
| 72 | Ta-Te Sun (TPE) | | 72 | H-2 | 10 | 5:19.396 | 29.43 |
| 73 | Lukasz Potepa (POL) | | 73 | H-3 | 10 | 5:28.711 | 30.617 |
| 74 | Li Shen (CHN) | | 78 | H-4 | 10 | 5:30.985 | 30.803 |
| 75 | Zhe Yi Shen (CHN) | | 79 | H-5 | 9 | 5:00.702 | 31.051 |
| 76 | Rene Levetzow (AUT) | | 77 | H-6 | 9 | 5:04.824 | 30.091 |
| 77 | Fumiyasu Toki (TPE) | | 76 | H-7 | 9 | 5:08.314 | 29.987 |
| 78 | Scott Kendall (NZL) | | 74 | H-8 | 9 | 5:09.474 | 29.82 |
| 79 | Juraj Hudy (SVK) | | 75 | H-9 | 9 | 5:17.258 | 30.652 |
| 80 | Jody Long (USA) | | 80 | H-10 | 6 | 5:53.42 | 30.546 |
| 81 | Le Hua Lin (CHN) | | 86 | I-1 | 9 | 5:00.516 | 30.496 |
| 82 | Carson Yeung (HKG) | | 82 | I-2 | 9 | 5:01.162 | 31.002 |
| 83 | Kato Daisuke (JPN) | | 90 | I-3 | 9 | 5:03.18 | 31.201 |
| 84 | Ryoji Takahashi (JPN) | | 84 | I-4 | 9 | 5:08.641 | 30.504 |
| 85 | Paul Sykes (HKG) | | 85 | I-5 | 9 | 5:16.372 | 31.342 |
| 86 | Kelly Churchill (NZL) | | 83 | I-6 | 9 | 5:17.186 | 31.149 |
| 87 | Hsiu-Ho Chang (TPE) | | 88 | I-7 | 9 | 5:18.838 | 30.942 |
| 88 | Jon Philpott (AUS) | | 81 | I-8 | 9 | 5:19.755 | 30.693 |
| 89 | Mark Lim (SGP) | | 87 | I-9 | 9 | 5:24.017 | 30.277 |
| 90 | Lee Backhee (KOR) | | 89 | I-10 | 7 | 4:19.855 | 30.091 |
| 91 | Kum Yew Chang (SGP) | | 91 | J-1 | 10 | 5:30.018 | 30.946 |
| 92 | Umezawa Naoki (JPN) | | 96 | J-2 | 9 | 5:07.579 | 31.886 |
| 93 | Tans Morgan (TPE) | | 97 | J-3 | 9 | 5:08.751 | 31.087 |
| 94 | Tamar Schaefer (SUI) | | 92 | J-4 | 9 | 5:11.936 | 30.324 |
| 95 | Shih-Chang Lu (TPE) | | 98 | J-5 | 9 | 5:18.343 | 31.616 |
| 96 | Fazly Ibrahim (SGP) | | 94 | J-6 | 9 | 5:18.39 | 30.97 |
| 97 | Kamen Koh (SGP) | | 99 | J-7 | 9 | 5:28.09 | 31.832 |
| 98 | Son Youngjin (KOR) | | 100 | J-8 | 8 | 5:14.57 | 32.624 |
| 99 | Luke Prattley (NZL) | | 93 | J-9 | 7 | 4:09.062 | 31.553 |
| 100 | Scott Yang (TPE) | | 95 | J-10 | DNS |
| 101 | Di Jia Chen (CHN) | | 106 | K-1 | 9 | 5:24.201 | 31.413 |
| 102 | Tao Wu (CHN) | | 107 | K-2 | 9 | 5:26.432 | 32.417 |
| 103 | Hsiang-Kun Cheng (TPE) | | 101 | K-3 | 9 | 5:33.587 | 31.554 |
| 104 | Jiang Tao Shi (CHN) | | 108 | K-4 | 9 | 5:38.717 | 33.63 |
| 105 | Kam Fai Billy Yeung (HKG) | | 103 | K-5 | 8 | 5:00.334 | 33.995 |
| 106 | Kamil Kubica (POL) | | 109 | K-6 | 8 | 5:02.637 | 33.191 |
| 107 | Yun Ruo Qian (CHN) | | 102 | K-7 | 8 | 5:11.415 | 32.195 |
| 108 | Ivan Cheung (HKG) | | 104 | K-8 | 8 | 5:18.957 | 32.583 |
| 109 | Prince Wang (TPE) | | 105 | K-9 | DNS |
| 110 | Xi Yong Zhao (CHN) | | 110 | K-10 | DNS |
| 111 | Pason Phua (SIN) | | 113 | L-1 | 9 | 5:35.026 | 33.65 |
| 112 | Xu Wang (CHN) | | 111 | L-2 | 8 | 5:12.471 | 36.258 |
| 113 | Xi Rui Chen (CHN) | | 112 | L-3 | 7 | 5:09.436 | 38.88 |
| 114 | Ren Hao Qu (CHN) | | 114 | L-4 | 7 | 5:21.73 | 40.682 |
| 115 | Peng Zhang (CHN) | | 115 | L-5 | 6 | 5:16.352 | 44.486 |
| 116 | Jia Lin Hou (CHN) | | 116 | L-6 | 5 | 3:36.156 | 40.258 |

== 4WD Results ==
| | | | Qual. | Final 1 | | | | | Final 2 | | | | | Final 3 | | | | | Total | | | | | Ref. |
| Pos. | Driver | Car | Qual. | Pos. | Laps | Time | FL | Pt. | Pos. | Laps | Time | FL | Pt. | Pos. | Laps | Time | FL | Pt. | Total | Disc | Net | Lap | Time | Ref. |
|---|---|---|---|---|---|---|---|---|---|---|---|---|---|---|---|---|---|---|---|---|---|---|---|---|
| 1 | Ryan Maifield (USA) | Yokomo; Orion | 4 | A-2 | 12 | 5:04.874 | 24.434 | 1 | 2 | 12 | 5:05.895 | | 2 | 2 | 12 | 5:13.255 | 24.804 | 2 | 5 | 2 | 3 | 24 | 10:010.769 |
| 2 | David Ronnefalk (SWE) | HB; Orion | 2 | A-1 | 12 | 5:14.345 | 24.931 | 3 | 1 | 12 | 5:04.393 | | 1 | 8 | 10 | 4:28.244 | 25.091 | 8 | 12 | 8 | 4 | 24 | 10:18.738 |
| 3 | Spencer Rivkin (USA) | Associated; Reedy | 5 | A-4 | 12 | 5:20.048 | 25.158 | 5 | 4 | 12 | 5:13.62 | | 4 | 1 | 12 | 5:12.871 | 25.054 | 1 | 10 | 5 | 5 | 24 | 10:26.491 |
| 4 | Ty Tessmann (CAN) | Xray; Orion | 1 | A-3 | 12 | 5:07.255 | 24.614 | 2 | 3 | 12 | 5:06.953 | | 3 | 3 | 12 | 5:14.605 | 24.613 | 3 | 8 | 3 | 5 | 24 | 10:14.208 |
| 5 | Joern Neumann (GER) | Xray; Orion | 6 | A-5 | 12 | 5:17.367 | 25.158 | 4 | 5 | 12 | 5:19.477 | | 5 | 10 | 2 | 0:56.494 | 25.755 | 10 | 19 | 10 | 9 | 24 | 10:36.844 |
| 6 | Naoto Matsukura (JPN) | Associated; Hobbywings | 8 | A-7 | 12 | 5:22.914 | 24.779 | 6 | 7 | 12 | 5:23.644 | | 7 | 5 | 12 | 5:24.457 | 24.665 | 5 | 18 | 7 | 11 | 24 | 10:46.558 |
| 7 | Ryan Cavalieri (USA) | Associated; Muchmore | 9 | A-9 | 11 | 5:01.747 | 25.777 | 8 | 9 | 11 | 5:01.523 | | 9 | 4 | 12 | 5:20.597 | 25.199 | 4 | 21 | 9 | 12 | 23 | 10:22.12 |
| 8 | Dakotah Phend (USA) | Losi; Orion | 7 | A-8 | 12 | 5:24.374 | 25.67 | 7 | 8 | 11 | 5:00.152 | | 8 | 6 | 11 | 5:06.659 | 25.091 | 6 | 21 | 8 | 13 | 23 | 10:24.526 |
| 9 | Bruno Coelho (POR) | Xray; Hobbywings | 3 | A-6 | 6 | 2:34.844 | 24.841 | 10 | 6 | 12 | 5:21.405 | | 6 | 9 | 7 | 5:43.154 | 26.63 | 9 | 25 | 10 | 15 | 19 | 10:64.559 |
| 10 | Dustin Evans (USA) | Associated; Reedy | 10 | A-10 | 11 | 5:10.561 | 25.751 | 9 | 10 | 8 | 3:44.162 | | 10 | 7 | 11 | 2:07.217 | 25.671 | 7 | 26 | 10 | 16 | 22 | 7:17.778 |

| | | | Qual. | Final 1 | | | | | Ref. |
| Pos. | Driver | Car | Qual. | Pos. | Laps | Time | FL | Place | Ref. |
|---|---|---|---|---|---|---|---|---|---|
| 11 | Lee Martin (GBR) | | 13 | B-1 | 12 | 5:17.101 | 25.452 | 1 |
| 12 | Hubert Hoenigl (AUT) | | 18 | B-2 | 12 | 5:23.556 | 25.811 | 2 |
| 13 | Kyle Ward-Mcbride (AUS) | | 12 | B-3 | 12 | 5:24.741 | 25.555 | 3 |
| 14 | Martin Bayer (CZE) | | 16 | B-4 | 11 | 5:00.567 | 25.773 | 4 |
| 15 | Daniel Kobbevik (NOR) | | 14 | B-5 | 11 | 5:02.476 | 25.881 | 5 |
| 16 | Jared Tebo (USA) | | 11 | B-6 | 11 | 5:03.777 | 25.898 | 6 |
| 17 | Karel Novotny (CZE) | | 17 | B-7 | 11 | 5:07.301 | 26.104 | 7 |
| 18 | Brent Thielke (USA) | | 19 | B-8 | 11 | 5:29.33 | 26.615 | 8 |
| 19 | Kohta Akimoto (JPN) | | 20 | B-9 | 8 | 3:52.264 | 26.928 | 9 |
| 20 | Renaud Savoya (FRA) | | 15 | B-10 | 7 | 3:19.72 | 26.165 | 10 |
| 21 | Michal Orlowski (POL) | | 22 | C-1 | 11 | 4:59.466 | 25.179 | 1 |
| 22 | Patrick Hofer (SUI) | | 25 | C-2 | 11 | 5:09.612 | 25.966 | 2 |
| 23 | Mitchell Steer (AUS) | | 30 | C-3 | 11 | 5:09.615 | 25.698 | 3 |
| 24 | Joshua Pain (AUS) | | 24 | C-4 | 11 | 5:10.712 | 26.349 | 4 |
| 25 | Atsushi Hara (JPN) | | 26 | C-5 | 11 | 5:13.952 | 25.835 | 5 |
| 26 | Kaito Kodera (JPN) | | 21 | C-6 | 11 | 5:18.258 | 26.298 | 6 |
| 27 | Ryan Lutz (USA) | | 23 | C-7 | 3 | 1:25.036 | 25.182 | 7 |
| 28 | Christopher Sturdy (AUS) | | 29 | C-8 | 3 | 1:30.602 | 26.046 | 8 |
| 29 | Shinnosuke Adachi (JPN) | | 27 | C-9 | 2 | 0:54.774 | 25.397 | 9 |
| 30 | Yusuke Sugiura (JPN) | | 28 | C-10 | 1 | 0:34.626 | 0 | 10 |
| 31 | Billy Easton (USA) | | 37 | D-1 | 12 | 5:25.434 | 25.566 | 1 |
| 32 | Tanner Denney (USA) | | 31 | D-2 | 11 | 5:02.087 | 25.418 | 2 |
| 33 | Tom Cockerill (GBR) | | 38 | D-3 | 11 | 5:02.554 | 25.62 | 3 |
| 34 | Paul Crompton (GBR) | | 36 | D-4 | 11 | 5:08.523 | 25.542 | 4 |
| 35 | Kouki Kato (JPN) | | 34 | D-5 | 11 | 5:10.853 | 26.314 | 5 |
| 36 | Kazuki Sasatsu (JPN) | | 39 | D-6 | 11 | 5:11.727 | 26.064 | 6 |
| 37 | Derek Wood (USA) | | 35 | D-7 | 11 | 5:15.834 | 26.44 | 7 |
| 38 | Ray Munday (AUS) | | 32 | D-8 | 11 | 5:22.603 | 25.874 | 8 |
| 39 | Shuji Nishio (JPN) | | 40 | D-9 | 10 | 5:03.065 | 25.812 | 9 |
| 40 | Frederik Hovgaard (DEN) | | 33 | D-10 | 2 | 1:12.62 | 31.376 | 10 |
| 41 | Clement Boda (FRA) | | 41 | E-1 | 11 | 5:21.681 | 27.259 | 1 |
| 42 | Shane O'Connor (NZL) | | 42 | E-2 | 10 | 5:03.702 | 28.658 | 2 |
| 43 | Matt Kellett (AUS) | | 46 | E-3 | 10 | 5:03.826 | 28.222 | 3 |
| 44 | Anthony Campbell (AUS) | | 47 | E-4 | 10 | 5:06.029 | 28.618 | 4 |
| 45 | Cameron Zammit (AUS) | | 44 | E-5 | 10 | 5:06.917 | 28.203 | 5 |
| 46 | Ezekiel M. Ballinger (USA) | | 43 | E-6 | 10 | 5:10.945 | 27.733 | 6 |
| 47 | Nathan Ralls (GBR) | | 49 | E-7 | 10 | 5:14.367 | 28.067 | 7 |
| 48 | Jerome Treignier (CAN) | | 50 | E-8 | 10 | 5:19.13 | 29.264 | 8 |
| 49 | Mathieux Chaffardon (FRA) | | 45 | E-9 | 10 | 5:19.432 | 28.553 | 9 |
| 50 | Felix Law (HKG) | | 48 | E-10 | 10 | 5:21.971 | 28.019 | 10 |
| 51 | Yui Kaino (JPN) | | 53 | F-1 | 11 | 5:21.814 | 26.897 | 1 |
| 52 | Christopher Mitchell (AUS) | | 56 | F-2 | 11 | 5:30.653 | 26.63 | 2 |
| 53 | Andrew Smolnik (USA) | | 51 | F-3 | 11 | 5:34.107 | 27.175 | 3 |
| 54 | Minsu Si (KOR) | | 52 | F-4 | 10 | 5:03.182 | 27.468 | 4 |
| 55 | Carson Yeung (HKG) | | 59 | F-5 | 10 | 5:04.63 | 27.953 | 5 |
| 56 | Jonathan Yeung (HKG) | | 58 | F-6 | 10 | 5:24.788 | 29.706 | 6 |
| 57 | Scott Kendall (NZL) | | 54 | F-7 | 10 | 5:30.175 | 28.705 | 7 |
| 58 | Kiheung Kim (KOR) | | 60 | F-8 | 10 | 5:33.57 | 27.786 | 8 |
| 59 | Andrew Selvaggi (AUS) | | 57 | F-9 | 4 | 2:22.03 | 32.287 | 9 |
| 60 | Dominic Quek (SGP) | | 55 | F-10 | 3 | 1:43.87 | 31.393 | 10 |
| 61 | Sven Rudig (AUT) | | 67 | G-1 | 11 | 5:30.569 | 28.523 | 1 |
| 62 | Changsu Si (KOR) | | 63 | G-2 | 10 | 5:05.569 | 28.182 | 2 |
| 63 | Wei Ping Hu (CHN) | | 62 | G-3 | 10 | 5:06.278 | 27.117 | 3 |
| 64 | Mike Walker (USA) | | 64 | G-4 | 10 | 5:06.691 | 28.243 | 4 |
| 65 | Juraj Hudy (SVK) | | 69 | G-5 | 10 | 5:11.021 | 28.446 | 5 |
| 66 | Lachlan Munday (AUS) | | 66 | G-6 | 10 | 5:20.438 | 28.461 | 6 |
| 67 | Jody Long (USA) | | 68 | G-7 | 9 | 5:01.694 | 29.75 | 7 |
| 68 | Hayato Matsuzaki (JPN) | | 61 | G-8 | 2 | 1:24.997 | 56.154 | 8 |
| 69 | Fabian Luca Widmer (SUI) | | 70 | G-9 | DNS | :00 | 0 | 9 |
| 69 | Mansoon Yim (KOR) | | 65 | G-10 | DNS | :00 | 0 | 10 |
| 71 | Daeyoon Jung (KOR) | | 72 | H-1 | 11 | 5:26.444 | 28.387 | 1 |
| 72 | Paul Sykes (HKG) | | 76 | H-2 | 10 | 5:02.8 | 29.177 | 2 |
| 73 | Ryoji Takahashi (JPN) | | 74 | H-3 | 10 | 5:09.673 | 29.482 | 3 |
| 74 | Ta-Te Sun (TPE) | | 75 | H-4 | 10 | 5:10.335 | 27.931 | 4 |
| 75 | Zhe Yi Shen (CHN) | | 80 | H-5 | 10 | 5:11.955 | 28.369 | 5 |
| 76 | Youngju Kim (KOR) | | 73 | H-6 | 10 | 5:16.306 | 29.231 | 6 |
| 77 | Prince Wang (TWN) | | 79 | H-7 | 10 | 5:23.275 | 30.194 | 7 |
| 78 | Jon Philpott (AUS) | | 78 | H-8 | 10 | 5:32.385 | 28.396 | 8 |
| 79 | Yi Bo Zhang (CHN) | | 77 | H-9 | 9 | 4:42.906 | 28.257 | 9 |
| 80 | Le Hua Lin (CHN) | | 71 | H-10 | DNS | :00 | 0 | 10 |
| 81 | Jian Jun Liu (CHN) | | 83 | I-1 | 10 | 5:15.698 | 29.162 | 1 |
| 82 | Kato Daisuke (JPN) | | 81 | I-2 | 10 | 5:16.957 | 29.437 | 2 |
| 83 | Kum Yew Chang (SGP) | | 82 | I-3 | 10 | 5:19.239 | 29.78 | 3 |
| 84 | Mark Lim (SGP) | | 87 | I-4 | 10 | 5:21.478 | 30.294 | 4 |
| 85 | Scott Yang (TWN) | | 86 | I-5 | 10 | 5:23.792 | 27.656 | 5 |
| 86 | Kelly Churchill (NZL) | | 85 | I-6 | 10 | 5:27.213 | 29.078 | 6 |
| 87 | Lee Backhee (KOR) | | 84 | I-7 | 9 | 5:02.431 | 29.469 | 7 |
| 88 | Kamen Koh (SGP) | | 90 | I-8 | 8 | 4:25.531 | 29.982 | 8 |
| 89 | Rene Levetzow (AUT) | | 89 | I-9 | 7 | 5:08.645 | 33.835 | 9 |
| 90 | Jarrod Smith (AUS) | | 88 | I-10 | 1 | 0:43.135 | 0 | 10 |
| 91 | Lukasz Potepa (POL) | | 94 | J-1 | 10 | 5:16.478 | 29.172 | 1 |
| 92 | Tamar Schaefer (SUI) | | 92 | J-2 | 10 | 5:20.983 | 29.953 | 2 |
| 93 | Son Youngjin (KOR) | | 93 | J-3 | 10 | 5:23.631 | 30.136 | 3 |
| 94 | Hsiang-Kun Cheng (TWN) | | 91 | J-4 | 9 | 4:58.836 | 29.661 | 4 |
| 95 | Luke Prattley (NZL) | | 95 | J-5 | 9 | 5:00.032 | 30.394 | 5 |
| 96 | Yan Cheung (HKG) | | 96 | J-6 | 9 | 5:03.068 | 28.903 | 6 |
| 97 | Rui Shen (CHN) | | 99 | J-7 | 9 | 5:15.004 | 30.63 | 7 |
| 98 | Tans Morgan (TWN) | | 100 | J-8 | 9 | 5:22.719 | 32.523 | 8 |
| 99 | Zhi Qiang Zhang (CHN) | | 98 | J-9 | 3 | 1:51.799 | 34.443 | 9 |
| 100 | Martin Owen (GBR) | | 97 | J-10 | 1 | 0:38.45 | 0 | 10 |
| 101 | Stickking Stickking (HKG) | | 101 | K-1 | 10 | 5:13.395 | 28.98 | 1 |
| 102 | Fazly Ibrahim (SGP) | | 108 | K-2 | 10 | 5:22.288 | 28.578 | 2 |
| 103 | Tao Wu (CHN) | | 105 | K-3 | 10 | 5:23.601 | 29.606 | 3 |
| 104 | Di Jia Chen (CHN) | | 102 | K-4 | 10 | 5:31.619 | 30.124 | 4 |
| 105 | Umezawa Naoki (JPN) | | 107 | K-5 | 10 | 5:33.44 | 29.912 | 5 |
| 106 | Lu Yi Zhang (CHN) | | 106 | K-6 | 9 | 5:15.692 | 31.516 | 6 |
| 107 | Pason Phua (SGP) | | 109 | K-7 | 9 | 5:24.431 | 31.647 | 7 |
| 108 | Kamil Kubica (POL) | | 104 | K-8 | 8 | 5:04.057 | 29.894 | 8 |
| 109 | Ivan Cheung (HKG) | | 103 | K-9 | 1 | 0:44.326 | 0 | 9 |
| 110 | Xi Yong Zhao (CHN) | | 110 | K-10 | DNS | :00 | 0 | 10 |
| 111 | Yun Ruo Qian (CHN) | | 113 | L-1 | 10 | 5:23.618 | 30.203 | 1 |
| 112 | Yang Lu (CHN) | | 114 | L-2 | 9 | 5:06.557 | 31.254 | 2 |
| 113 | Yun Yao (CHN) | | 115 | L-3 | 9 | 5:07.836 | 30.848 | 3 |
| 114 | Jiang Tao Shi (CHN) | | L-4 | 9 | 5:08.146 | 30.416 | 4 |
| 115 | Kam Fai, Billy Yeung (HKG) | | L-5 | 9 | 5:10.265 | 30.338 | 5 |
| 116 | Yi Kun Li (CHN) | | 116 | L-6 | 9 | 5:28.595 | 31.458 | 6 |
| 117 | Jia Lin Hou (CHN) | | 117 | L-7 | 8 | 5:22.766 | 31.63 | 7 |
| 118 | Li Jun Xi (CHN) | | 118 | L-8 | 3 | 1:59.754 | 37.484 | 8 |
| 119 | Xi Rui Chen (CHN) | | 120 | L-9 | DNS | :00 | 0 | 9 |
| 120 | Rui Yang You (CHN) | | 119 | L-10 | DNS | :00 | 0 | 10 |
| 121 | Yu Han Du (CHN) | | 122 | L-11 | DNS | :00 | 0 | 11 |
| 122 | Che Xi Chen (CHN) | | 121 | L-12 | DNS | :00 | 0 | 12 |
