= 2005 IFMAR 1:10 Electric Off-Road World Championships =

Event Information
- Event Title: 2005 IFMAR 1:10 Electric Off-Road World Championships
- Dates run: 6–13 August 2005

Club Information
- Location: Collegno,
- Host country: Italy

Vehicle Specification
- Class: 1:10 Electric Offroad Buggy

2wd Title
- First: Neil Cragg (GBR); Associated - RC10B4

4WD Title
- First: Ryan Cavalieri (USA); Jconcepts - BJ4 Worlds

The 2005 IFMAR 1:10 Electric Off-Road World Championships was the tenth edition of the IFMAR 1:10 Electric Off-Road World Championship was held on August 6–13, 2005.

== 2WD Results ==
			Qual.	Final 1					Final 2					Final 3					Total		
Pos.	Driver	Car	Qual.	Pos.	Laps	Time	FL	Pt.	Pos.	Laps	Time	FL	Pt.	Pos.	Laps	Time	FL	Pt.	Total	Lap	Time
1	Neil Cragg (GBR)	Associated; RC10B4	461	2	11	5:11.5		9	1	11	5:13.454		10	1	11	5:13.93		10	19	22	10:24.954
2	Ryan Cavalieri (USA)	Associated; RC10B4	465	1	11	5:11.14		10	3	11	5:21.76		8	3	11	5:15.385		8	16	22	10:26.525
3	Ryan Maifield (USA)	Associated; RC10B4	460	6	11	5:22.647		5	2	11	5:14.434		9	2	11	5:14.427		9	14	22	10:28.861
4	Atsushi Hara (JPN)	Associated; RC10B4	440	3	11	5:15.571		8	5	11	5:25.697		6	7	11	5:28.252		4	10	22	10:41.268
5	Jared Tebo (USA)	Associated; RC10B4	453	5	11	5:21.847		6	7	11	5:26.872		4	5	11	5:19.049		6	10	22	10:40.896
6	Masami Hirosaka (JPN)	Associated; RC10B4	442	7	11	5:27.059		4	4	11	5:24.955		7	10	10	5:03.958		1	5	22	10:52.014
7	Billy Easton (USA)	Losi XXX	449	9	11	5:27.782		2	8	11	5:28.936		3	4	11	5:17.334		7	5	22	10:45.116
8	Dave Montgomery (USA)	Associated; RC10B4	445	4	11	5:21.513		7	10	10	5:01.378		1	8	11	5:28.835		3	4	22	10:50.348
9	Mike Truhe (USA)	Losi XXX	441	8	11	5:27.52		3	6	11	5:25.73		5	9	10	5:02.864		2	5	22	10:53.25
10	Travis Amezcua (USA)	Losi XXX	450	10	10	4:53.424		1	9	10	5:00.247		2	6	11	5:24.381		5	3	21	9:77.805

== 4WD Results ==
			Qual.	Final 1					Final 2					Final 3					Total		
Pos.	Driver	Car	Qual.	Pos.	Laps	Time	FL	Pt.	Pos.	Laps	Time	FL	Pt.	Pos.	Laps	Time	FL	Pt.	Total	Lap	Time
1	Ryan Cavalieri (USA)	Jconcepts; BJ4 Worlds		1	11	5:02.992		10	1	11	5:04.289		10	10	0	DNS		1	11	22	10:07.281
2	Neil Cragg (GBR)	Yokomo		3	11	5:08.382		8	3	11	5:08.279		8	1	12	5:27.037		10	16	23	10:35.316
3	Ryan Maifield (USA)	Jconcepts; BJ4 Worlds		2	11	5:04.457		9	5	11	5:09.947		6	2	12	5:28.851		9	15	23	10:33.308
4	Billy Easton (USA)	Losi xx-4		4	11	5:10.290		7	2	11	5:05.162		9	4	11	5:06.455		7	14	22	10:11.617
5	Masami Hirosaka (JPN)	Yokomo		5	11	5:10.596		6	6	11	5:10.544		5	3	11	5:05.368		8	11	22	10:15.912
6	Peter Pinisch (AUT)	Jconcepts; BJ4 Worlds		10	1	0:18.565		1	4	11	5:09.725		7	7	11	5:15.342		4	5	22	10:25.067
7	Craig Drescher (GBR)	Jconcepts; BJ4 Worlds		7	11	5:17.147		4	7	11	5:10.973		4	5	11	5:13.559		6	8	22	10:24.532
8	Paul Brady (GBR)	Yokomo		9	3	1:25.635		2	8	11	5:13.308		3	6	11	5:14.261		5	5	22	10:27.569
9	Jesse Robbers (USA)	Losi xx-4		6	11	5:15.658		5	9	11	5:15.718		2	8	11	5:15.816		3	5	22	10:31.376
10	Atsushi Hara (JPN)	Durango		8	11	5:17.799		3	10	11	5:17.061		1	9	8	3:37.472		2	3	22	10:34.860
