= 2011 IFMAR 1:10 Electric Off-Road World Championships =

Held in Finland

Coordinates: 63.0752766°N 21.6800757°E

Event Information
- Event Title: 2011 IFMAR 1:10 Electric Off-Road World Championships
- Dates run: 17–24 July 2011

Club Information
- Location: Vaasa,
- Host country: Finland

Vehicle Specification
- Class: 1:10 Electric Offroad Buggy

2wd Title
- First: Ryan Cavalieri (USA); Associated
- Second: Ryan Maifield (USA)
- Third: Jared Tebo (USA); Kyosho

4WD Title
- First: Ryan Cavalieri (USA); Associated; B4.1 Long Wheelbase
- Second: Jörn Neumann (GER); Durango; DEX410
- Third: Jared Tebo (USA); Kyosho; ZX5 FS2

The 2011 IFMAR 1:10 Electric Off-Road World Championships was the fourteenth edition of the IFMAR 1:10 Electric Off-Road World Championship was held in Finland. The event proved a clean sweep for American Ryan Cavalieri winning both the 2WD and 4WD category.

The track was hard packed clay and a little over 200 m in run length and 3 meters wide. The track was packed with obstacles in the form of single jump, corner table, quadruple jump, logs, moguls, hump with negative banking, two single jumps, high speed double jump, double jump and a speed bump.

== 2WD results ==
			Qual.	Final 1					Final 2					Final 3					Total					Ref.
Pos.	Driver	Car	Qual.	Pos.	Laps	Time	FL	Pt.	Pos.	Laps	Time	FL	Pt.	Pos.	Laps	Time	FL	Pt.	Total	Disc	Net	Lap	Time	Ref.
1	Ryan Cavalieri (USA)	Associated	2	2	13	5:20.548		2	2	13	5:13.9		2	1	13	5:14.162		1	5	2	3	26	10:28.062	
2	Ryan Maifield (USA)		3	5	13	5:27.259		5	1	13	5:14.744		1	2	13	5:15.591		2	8	5	3	26	10:30.335	
3	Jared Tebo (USA)		4	1	13	5:19.138		1	5	13	5:22.632		5	9	9	3:36.618		9	15	9	6	26	10:41.77	
4	Dustin Evans (USA)		5	4	13	5:26.563		4	4	13	5:21.633		4	3	13	5:16.112		3	11	4	7	26	10:37.745	
5	Joern Neumann (GER)		9	6	12	5:01.363		6	3	13	5:21.109		3	5	13	5:25.413		5	14	6	8	26	10:46.522	
6	Neil Cragg (GBR)		1	3	13	5:21.504		3	6	13	5:23.447		6	10	0	0:00		10	19	10	9	26	10:44.951	
7	Dakotah Phend (USA)		8	8	12	5:11.911		8	9	12	5:06.388		9	4	13	5:23.185		4	21	9	12	24	10:18.299	
8	Naoto Matsukura (JPN)	Associated	7	9	12	5:12.115		9	7	13	5:25.389		7	6	12	5:02.1		6	22	9	13	25	10:27.489	
9	Lee Martin (GBR)		6	7	12	5:11.356		7	8	12	5:04.7		8	7	12	5:02.396		7	22	8	14	24	10:07.096	
10	Peter Pinisch (AUT)		10	10	12	5:12.623		10	10	12	5:11.61		10	8	12	5:04.601		8	28	10	18	24	10:16.211	

			Final	Ref.
Pos.	Driver	Car	Final	Ref.
11	Mike Truhe (USA)		B-1	
12	Brent Thielke (USA)		B-2	
13	Paul Bradby (GBR)		B-3	
14	Kohta Akimoto (JPN)		B-4	
15	David Ronnefalk (SWE)		B-5	
16	Tom Cockerill (GBR)		B-6	
17	Steven Hartson (USA)		B-7	
18	Marc Rheinard (GER)		B-8	
19	Brian Kinwald (USA)		B-9	
20	Keisuke Enomoto (JPN)		B-10	
21	Matt Castellano (USA)		C-1	
22	Richard Lowe (GBR)		C-2	
23	Oskar Levin (SWE)		C-3	
24	Alex Hardt (GER)		C-4	
25	Shin Adachi (JPN)		C-5	
26	Yusuke Sugiura (JPN)		C-6	
27	Hubert Hönigl (AUT)		C-7	
28	Karri Salmela (FIN)		C-8	
29	Billy Fischer (USA)		C-9	
30	Petri Ström (FIN)		C-10	
31	Cody King (USA)		D-1	
32	Joseph Quagraine (FIN)		D-2	
33	Magnus Vässmar (SWE)		D-3	
34	Juho Levänen (FIN)		D-4	
35	Tommi Torikka (FIN)		D-5	
36	Joe Pillars (USA)		D-6	
37	Christopher Krapp (GER)		D-7	
38	Mikael Johansson (SWE)		D-8	
39	Zack Rogers (USA)		D-9	
40	Christopher Jarosz (USA)		D-10	
41	Armand Lantheaume (FRA)		E-1	
42	Adam Skelding (GBR)		E-2	
43	Nathan Ralls (GBR)		E-3	
44	Martin Achter (GER)		E-4	
45	Per-Erik Nordman (SWE)		E-5	
46	Matt Chambers (USA)		E-6	
47	Viktor Wilck (SWE)		E-7	
48	Marcus Lubke (GER)		E-8	
49	Ari Heinonen (FIN)		E-9	
50	Julien Formentin (FRA)		E-10	
51	Ole Steen Karlsen (NOR)		F-1	
52	Emilio Zacarias Villalba (ESP)		F-2	
53	Juliya Kajiwara (JPN)		F-3	
54	Sami Salmela (FIN)		F-4	
55	Oliver Scholz (GER)		F-5	
56	Samuli Kesseli (FIN)		F-6	
57	Kim Sitensky (GER)		F-7	
58	Kevin Seysen (FRA)		F-8	
59	Jussi Luopajärvi (FIN)		F-9	
60	Otto Ausfelt (SWE)		F-10	
61	Ben Jemison (GBR)		G-1	
62	Marko Mikama (FIN)		G-2	
63	Kenneth Malkusson (SWE)		G-3	
64	Tomi Mairue (FIN)		G-4	
65	Gerd Pfeifer (SUI)		G-5	
66	Mathew Primmer (AUS)		G-6	
67	Sørlie Martin (NOR)		G-7	
68	Arto Heinonen (FIN)		G-8	
69	John Spencer (GBR)		G-9	
70	Elliot Boots (GBR)	Durango; DEX 210	G-10	
71	Stefan Mesker (NED)		H-1	
72	Jani Hovi (FIN)		H-2	
73	Andreas Janda (AUT)		H-3	
74	Olivier De Montfumat (FRA)		H-4	
75	Shunsuke Koike (JPN)		H-5	
76	Jarno Siltanen (FIN)		H-6	
77	Nicklas Månsson (SWE)		H-7	
78	Dmitry Gribov (RUS)		H-8	
79	David Poulter (GBR)		H-9	
80	Jan Larsen (DEN)		H-10	
81	Vesa Yli (FIN)		I-1	
82	Patrick Vogt (SUI)		I-2	
83	Mattias Forsberg (SWE)		I-3	
84	Dmitry Beresten (RUS)		I-4	
85	Daniel Persson (SWE)		I-5	
86	Christer Rasmussen (DEN)		I-6	
87	Oliver Pruessmann (GER)		I-7	
88	Andreas Daving (NOR)		I-8	
89	Kjell Gunnar Guttormsen (NOR)		I-9	
90	Piotr Okonski (POL)		I-10	
91	Henry Salmén (FIN)		J-1	
92	Matti Eskelinen (FIN)		J-2	
93	Johannes Edren (SWE)		J-3	
94	Thomas Bujara (GER)		J-4	
95	Gareth Stanton (GBR)		J-5	
96	Michal Orlowski (POL)		J-6	
97	Ashley Peeler (AUS)		J-7	
98	Cédric Devillers (FRA)		J-8	
99	Riku Tolonen (FIN)		J-9	
100	Lasse Nielsen (DEN)		J-10	
101	Leigh Cheeseman (AUS)		K-1	
102	Neil Round (GBR)		K-2	
103	Dmitry Malyshko (RUS)		K-3	
104	Jan Dalh (SWE)		K-4	
105	Richard Salamonsen (NOR)		K-5	
106	Eduardo Prieto (ESP)		K-6	
107	Mikael Hedin (SWE)		K-7	
108	Javier Aguero Duran (ESP)		K-8	
109	Ulrich Rasmussen (DEN)		K-9	
110	Sven Rudig (GER)		K-10	
111	Nicolas Floudas (GRE)		L-1	
112	Rene Levetzow (AUT)		L-2	
113	Matthew Owen (GBR)		L-3	
114	Heikki Sorri (FIN)		L-4	
115	Peter Eriksson (SWE)		L-5	
116	Helland Jostein (NOR)		L-6	
117	Jaco Van Eeden (RSA)		L-7	
118	Sætre Trond (NOR)		L-8	
119	Stanislaw Pyrka (POL)		L-9	
120	David Church (GBR)		L-10	
121	Eberhard Beck (GER)		M-1	
122	Yavuz Kura (GER)		M-2	
123	Alejandro Gonzalez (ESP)		M-3	
124	Jesper Rasmussen (DEN)		M-4	
125	Lars Jonsson (SWE)		M-5	
126	Patryk Rybarczyk (POL)		M-6	
127	Michael Bolger (IRL)		M-7	
128	Gosha Plamodyanov (RUS)		M-8	
129	Frédéric Pain (FRA)		M-9	
130	Stephen Lawson (GBR)		M-10	
131	Ramon Lopez Farinos (ESP)		N-1	
132	Felipe Pageo (ESP)		N-2	
133	Amit Bublil (ISR)		N-3	
134	Neil Kovacs (AUS)		N-4	
135	Evgeny Timoschenko (RUS)		N-5	
136	Asaf Gorevich (ISR)		N-6	
137	Chi Hang Tang (HKG)		N-7	
138	Ole Morten Finnset (NOR)		N-8	

== 4WD results ==
			Qual.	Final 1					Final 2					Final 3					Total					Ref.
Pos.	Driver	Car	Qual.	Pos.	Laps	Time	FL	Pt.	Pos.	Laps	Time	FL	Pt.	Pos.	Laps	Time	FL	Pt.	Total	Disc	Net	Lap	Time	Ref.
1	Ryan Cavalieri (USA)	Associated; B4.1 Long Wheelbase	3	1	13	5:03.019		10	1	14	5:20.21		10	10	DNS	:00		1	21	1	20	27	10:23.229	
2	Jörn Neumann (GER)	Durango; DEX410DEX410	2	10	9	3:20.9		1	3	14	5:23.031		8	1	14	5:20.618		10	19	1	18	28	10:43.649	
3	Jared Tebo (USA)	Kyosho; ZX5 FS2ZX5 FS2	4	2	13	5:03.611		9	2	14	5:22.568		9	5	13	5:05.992		6	24	6	18	27	10:26.179	
4	Ryan Maifield (USA)	Associated; B44.1B44.1	1	4	13	5:04.936		7	4	14	5:25.951		7	2	14	5:20.929		9	23	7	16	28	10:46.88	
5	Hubert Hoenigl (AUT)	Durango; DEX410DEX410	6	5	13	5:08.42		6	7	13	5:05.768		4	3	13	5:00.474		8	18	4	14	26	10:06.242	
6	Neil Cragg (GBR)	Associated; B44.1B44.1	5	3	13	5:03.879		8	6	13	5:04.94		5	9	3	0:57.55		2	15	2	13	26	10:08.819	
7	Lee Martin (GBR)	Tamiya; TRF511TRF511	7	6	13	5:09.073		5	8	13	5:05.77		3	4	13	5:01.368		7	15	3	12	26	10:07.138	
8	Naoto Matsukura (JPN)	Yokomo; Bmax 4 IIBmax 4 II	10	8	13	5:13.664		3	5	13	5:02.22		6	7	12	5:12.187		4	13	3	10	26	10:15.884	
9	Dakotah Phend (USA)	Losi; XXX4g+XXX4g+	9	9	13	5:15.106		2	10	13	5:13.798		1	6	13	5:02.202		5	8	1	7	26	10:16	
10	Kohta Akimoto (JPN)	Kyosho; ZX5 FS2ZX5 FS2	8	7	13	5:09.497		4	9	13	5:11.415		2	8	6	2:00.066		3	9	2	7	26	10:20.912	

			Final.	Ref.
Pos.	Driver	Car	Final.	Ref.
11	Mike Truhe (USA)		B-1	
12	Joseph Quagraine (FIN)		B-2	
13	Yusuke Sugiura (JPN)		B-3	
14	Elliot Boots (GBR)		B-4	
15	Dustin Evans (USA)		B-5	
16	Marc Rheinard (GER)		B-6	
17	Brent Thielke (USA)		B-7	
18	Shiniosuke Adachi (JPN)		B-8	
19	Billy Fischer (USA)	Durango	B-9	
20	Arto Heinonen (FIN)		B-10	
21	David Ronnefalk (SWE)		C-1	
22	Heikki Sorri (FIN)		C-2	
23	Keisuke Enomoto (JPN)		C-3	
24	Peter Pinisch (AUT)		C-4	
25	Steven Hartson (USA)		C-5	
26	Shunsuke Koike (JPN)		C-6	
27	Cody King (USA)		C-7	
28	Martin Achter (GER)		C-8	
29	Brian Kinwald (USA)		C-9	
30	Magnus Vassmar (SWE)	Schumacher; Cat SX3	C-10	
31	Tom Cockerill (GBR)		D-1	
32	Viktor Wilck (SWE)		D-2	
33	Arto Heinonen (FIN)		D-3	
34	Alex Hardt (GER)		D-4	
35	Mikael Johansson (SWE)		D-5	
36	Viljami Kutvonen (FIN)		D-6	
37	Matt Castellano (USA)		D-7	
38	Armand Lantheaume (FRA)		D-8	
39	Christopher Jarosz (USA)		D-9	
40	Nathan Ralls (GBR)		D-10	
41	Christopher Krapp (GER)		E-1	
42	Adam Skelding (GBR)		E-2	
43	Richard Lowe (GBR)		E-3	
44	Joe Pillars (USA)		E-4	
45	Jani Hovi (FIN)		E-5	
46	Janne Aspinen (FIN)		E-6	
47	Harri Kervola (FIN)		E-7	
48	Ben Jemison (GBR)		E-8	
49	Ole Steen Karlsen (NOR)		E-9	
50	Petri Ström (FIN)		E-10	
51	Juriya Kajiwara (JPN)		F-1	
52	Sørlie Martin (NOR)		F-2	
53	Tomi Mairue (FIN)		F-3	
54	Piotr Okonski (POL)		F-4	
55	Jarno Siltanen (FIN)		F-5	
56	Riku Tolonen (FIN)		F-6	
57	Matt Chambers (USA)		F-7	
58	Oskar Levin (SWE)		F-8	
59	Mathew Primmer (AUS)		F-9	
60	Stefan Mesker (NED)		F-10	
61	Zack Rogers (USA)		G-1	
62	Samuli Kesseli (FIN)		G-2	
63	Andreas Daving (NOR)		G-3	
64	Gerd Pfeifer (SUI)		G-4	
65	Matti Eskelinen (FIN)		G-5	
66	Nicklas Månsson (SWE)		G-6	
67	Karri Salmela (FIN)		G-7	
68	Kim Sitensky (GER)		G-8	
69	Christer Andersson (FIN)		G-9	
70	Juho Levänen (FIN)		G-10	
71	Dmitry Malyshko (RUS)		H-1	
72	Kenneth Malkusson (SWE)		H-2	
73	Patrick Vogt (SUI)		H-3	
74	Kalle Lehto (FIN)		H-4	
75	Jussi Luopajärvi (FIN)		H-5	
76	Sami Salmela (FIN)		H-6	
77	Per-Erik Nordman (SWE)		H-7	
78	Ashley Peeler (AUS)		H-8	
79	Jan Larsen (DEN)		H-9	
80	Emilio Zacarias Villalba (ESP)		H-10	
81	David Poulter (GBR)		I-1	
82	Lasse Nielsen (DEN)		I-2	
83	Christer Rasmussen (DEN)		I-3	
84	John Spencer (GBR)		I-4	
85	Guttormsen Kjell Gunnar (NOR)		I-5	
86	Marcus Lubke (GER)		I-6	
87	Marko Mikama (FIN)		I-7	
88	Dmitry Beresten (RUS)		I-8	
89	Sven Rudig (GER)		I-9	
90	Otto Ausfelt (SWE)		I-10	
91	Frédéric Pain (FRA)		J-1	
92	Jesper Rasmussen (DEN)		J-2	
93	Vesa Yli (FIN)		J-3	
94	Thomas Bujara (GER)		J-4	
95	Oliver Pruessmann (GER)		J-5	
96	Eberhard Beck (GER)		J-6	
97	Paul Bradby (GBR)		J-7	
98	David Gibson (GBR)		J-8	
99	Neil Round (GBR)		J-9	
100	Kevin Seysen (FRA)		J-10	
101	Pauli Helin (FIN)		K-1	
102	Mattias Forsberg (SWE)		K-2	
103	Sætre Trond (NOR)		K-3	
104	Jan Dalh (SWE)		K-4	
105	Ulrich Rasmussen (DEN)		K-5	
106	Leigh Cheeseman (AUS)		K-6	
107	Daniel Persson (SWE)		K-7	
108	Mikael Hedin (SWE)		K-8	
109	Stephen Lawson (GBR)		K-9	
110	Johannes Edren (SWE)		K-10	
111	Gosha Plamodyanov (RUS)		L-1	
112	Salomonsen Richard (NOR)		L-2	
113	Nikke Pitka (FIN)		L-3	
114	Yavuz Kura (GER)		L-4	
115	Matthew Owen (GBR)		L-5	
116	Rene Levetzow (AUT)		L-6	
117	Gareth Stanton (GBR)		L-7	
118	Julien Formentin (FRA)		L-8	
119	Cédric Devillers (FRA)		L-9	
120	Andreas Janda (AUT)		L-10	
121	Helland Jostein (NOR)		M-1	
122	Matti Räsänen (FIN)		M-2	
123	David Church (GBR)		M-3	
124	Lars Jonsson (SWE)		M-4	
125	Amit Bublil (ISR)		M-5	
126	Niko Andersson (FIN)		M-6	
127	Damian Zalewski (POL)		M-7	
128	Evgeny Timoschenko (RUS)		M-8	
129	Nicolas Floudas (GRE)		M-9	
130	Ole Morten Finnset (NOR)		M-10	
131	Jaco van Eeden (RSA)		N-1	
132	Michael Bolger (IRL)		N-2	
133	Stefan Wallberg (SWE)		N-3	
134	Heikki Sorri (FIN)		N-4	
135	Chi Hang Tang (HKG)		N-5	
136	Marcus Berglund (SWE)		N-6	
137	Neil Kovacs (AUS)		N-7	
138	Jonas Glad (SWE)		N-8	
139	Asaf Gorevich (ISR)		N-9	
140	Dmitry Gribov (RUS)		N-10	
141	Tomi Laine (FIN)		N-11	
