= 1999 IFMAR 1:10 Electric Off-Road World Championships =

Club Information
- Venue: Umihall Racing Arena
- Location: Rauma,
- Host country: Finland

Vehicle Specification
- Class: 1:10 Electric Offroad Buggy

2WD Class
- First: (Japan) Masami Hirosaka; Associated
- Second: (United States) Mark Pavidis; Associated
- Third: (United States) Brian Kinwald; Losi

4WD Class
- First: (Finland) Jukka Steenari; Losi
- Second: (United States) Jimmy Jacobson; Losi
- Third: (United States) Brian Kinwald; Losi

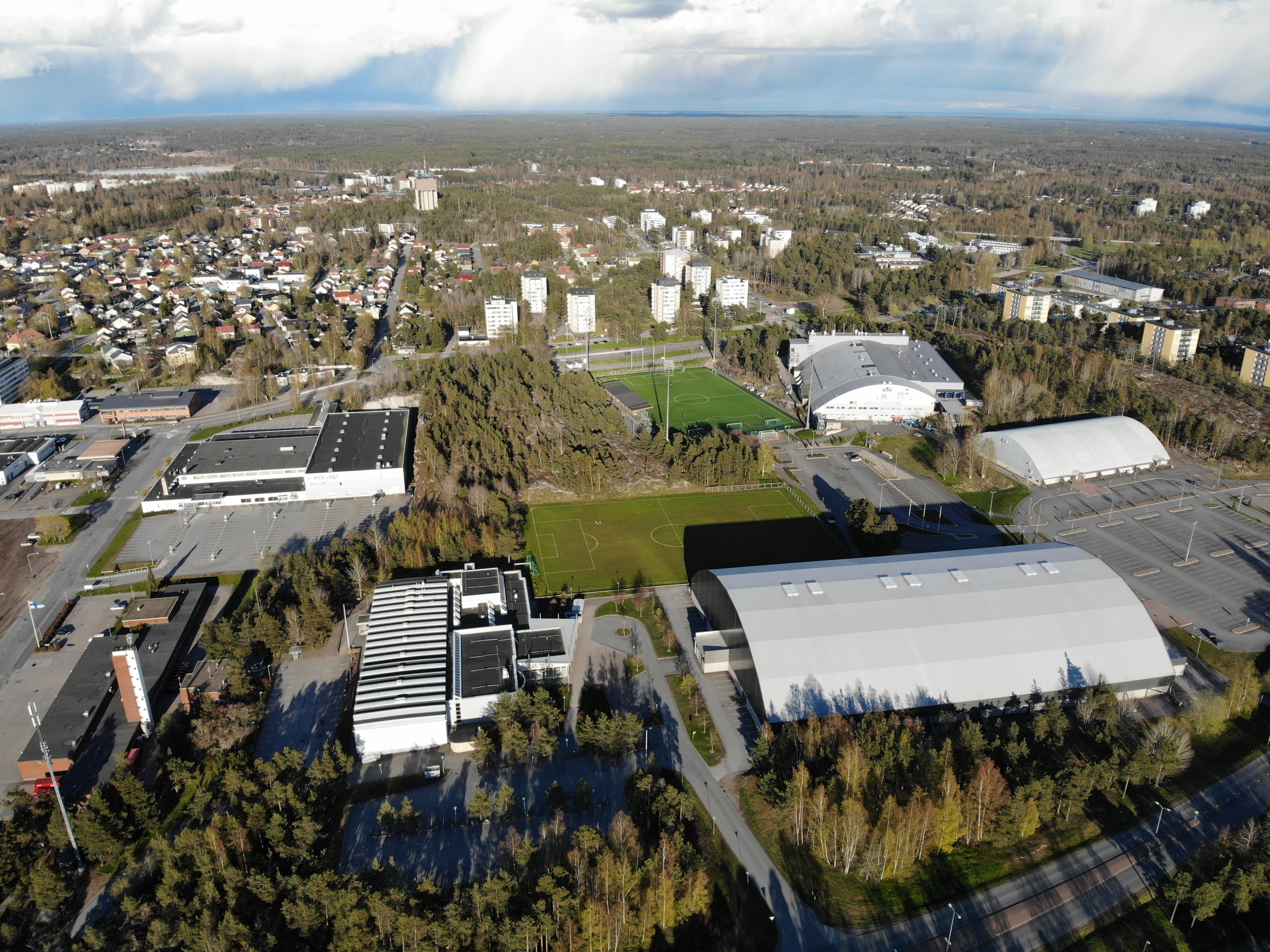
The drone shot (taken in May 2020) of the 1999 Worlds venue, visibly shown on front right.

The 1999 IFMAR 1:10 Electric Off-Road World Championship was the eighth edition of the IFMAR 1:10 Electric Off-Road World Championship . The event is for electrically powered radio-controlled cars which conform to rules set out by IFMAR for the design / construction of the offroad buggies. The event was held indoors in Rauma in Finland. Racing was held indoors at the Umihall Racing Arena which is a multi sports venue built in the early 1980s. The venue has been used for RC events before having previously hosted the 1995 European Championship. There were 19 countries represented and a staggering 45000 laps were completed by the competitors during the event. .

== Results ==
=== 2WD ===
==== Qualifying ====
Pos.	Driver	Car-Motor	Q1	Q2	Q3	Q4	Q5	Score
1	(United States) Mark Pavidis	Associated-Reedy						
2	(United States) Brian Kinwald	Losi-Trinity						
3	(Japan) Masami Hirosaka	Associated-Reedy						
4	(United States) Jason Ruona	Associated-Reedy						
5	(United States) Rick Hohwart	Losi-Peak						
6	(United States) Billy Easton	Associated-Reedy						
7	(United States) Lloyd Dassonville	Associated-Reedy						
8	(Finland) Teemu Leino	Schumacher-Orion						
9	(Finland) Jukka Steenari	Losi-Orion						
10	(Finland) Jouko Termonen	Associated-Peak						

==== Race ====
				Qual.	A1				A2				A3				Total		
Pos.	Driver	Car	Motor	Qual.	Pos.	Time	Laps	Pts	Pos.	Time	Laps	Pts	Pos.	Time	Laps	Pts	Total	Laps	Time
1	(Japan) Masami Hirosaka	Associated RC10B3	Reedy Sonic 2	3	1			10	7			4	1			10	20	24	24:10.49
2	(United States) Mark Pavidis	Associated RC10B3	Reedy Sonic 2	1	5			6	2			9	2			9	18	24	24:10.50
3	(United States) Brian Kinwald	Losi XXX	Trinity D3.5	2	4			7	1			10	4			7	17	23	23:10.26
4	(United States) Billy Easton	Associated RC10B3	Reedy Sonic 2	6	6			5	3			8	3			8	16	22	22:10.07
5	(Finland) Jukka Steenari	Losi XXX	Orion	9	3			8	4			7	6			5	15	22	22:10.05
6	(United States) Rick Hohwart	Losi XXX	Peak Aurora	5	2			9	10			1	9			2	11	22	22:10.17
7	(United States) Jason Ruona	Associated RC10B3	Reedy Sonic 2	4	10			1	5			6	7			4	10	22	22:10.18
8	(Finland) Jouko Termonen	Associated RC10B3	Peak Aurora	10	9			2	8			3	5			6	9	22	22:10.27
9	(United States) Lloyd Dassonville	Associated RC10B3	Reedy Sonic 2	7	7			4	6			5	10			1	9	22	22:10.19
10	(Finland) Teemu Leino	Schumacher Fireblade EVO	Orion	8	8			3	9			2	8			3	6	22	22:10.25

=== 4wd ===
==== Qualifying ====
Pos.	Driver	Car-Motor	Time	Av. Lap	Q1	Q2	Q3	Q4	Q5	Score
1	(Finland) Jukka Steenari	Losi-Orion	5:22	26.86						
2	(United States) Brian Kinwald	Losi-Trinity	5:23	26.98						
3	(United States) Mark Pavidis	Yokomo	5:27	27.25						
4	(Finland) Teemu Leino	Schumacher-Orion	5:27	27.25						
5	(United States) Scott Brown	Losi-Trinity	5:01	27.43						
6	(United States) Mark Francis	Losi-Trinity	5:01	27.37						
7	(Finland) Teppo Kauppinen	Losi-Orion	5:03	27.55						
8	(United States) Brian Dunbar	Losi	5:01	27.42						
9	(United States) Jimmy Jacobson	Losi-Orion	5:02	27.46						
10	(United States) Matt Francis	Losi-Trinity	5:02	27.46						

==== Race ====
				Qual.	A1				A2				A3				Total		
Pos.	Driver	Car	Motor	Pos	Pos.	Time	Laps	Pts	Pos.	Time	Laps	Pts	Pos.	Time	Laps	Pts	Total	Laps	Time
1	(Finland) Jukka Steenari	Losi XX-4	Orion Chrome	1	1			10	1			10	10			1	20	22	22:10.22
2	(United States) Jimmy Jacobson	Losi XX-4	Orion	9	4			7	2			9	3			8	17	22	22:10.31
3	(United States) Brian Kinwald	Losi XX-4	Trinity D3.5	2	10			1	3			8	2			9	17	22	22:10.30
4	(Finland) Teemu Leino	Schumacher CAT 2000	Orion	4	7			4	6			5	1			10	15	22	22:10.34
5	(Finland) Teppo Kauppinen	Losi XX-4	Orion	7	3			8	9			2	4			7	15	22	22:10.39
6	(United States) Mark Francis	Losi XX-4	Trinity D3.5	6	9			2	4			7	5			6	13	22	22:10.44
7	(United States) Mark Pavidis	Yokomo MX-4	Reedy Tri-Sonic	3	2			9	10			1	7			4	13	22	22:10.47
8	(United States) Scott Brown	Losi XX-4	Trinity D3.5	5	6			5	5			6	8			3	11	22	22:10.43
9	(United States) Brian Dunbar	Losi XX-4	GM Racing Evo 3	8	5			6	8			3	6			5	11	22	22:10.47
10	(United States) Matt Francis	Losi XX-4	Trinity D3.5	10	8			3	7			4	9			2	7	22	22:10.49
