= 1997 IFMAR 1:10 Electric Off-Road World Championships =

Car Race Championship

Club Information
- Venue: Ranch Pit Stop Track
- Location: Pomona, Southern California
- Host country: United States
- Surface: Hardpack

Vehicle Specification
- Class: 1:10 Electric Offroad Buggies

2WD Class
- First: (United States) Brian Kinwald; Losi - Trinity
- Second: (United States) Brian Dunbar; Losi - GM Racing
- Third: (Japan) Masami Hirosaka; Associated - Reedy

4WD Class
- First: (Japan) Masami Hirosaka; Yokomo - Reedy
- Second: (Finland) Jukka Steenari; Schumacher
- Third: (Finland) Teemu Leino; Schumacher

The 1997 IFMAR 1:10 Electric Off-Road World Championship was the 7th edition of the biennial IFMAR 1:10 Electric Off-Road World Championship for 1:10 scale radio-controlled electric off-road buggies sanctioned by the International Federation of Model Auto Racing (IFMAR) to be run over two classes (2WD and 4WD) over seven days between 9 and 16 August 1997 with each class ran for three days.

The national sanctional body was the Remotely Operated Auto Racers (ROAR) the IFMAR member for North America.

== Circuit ==
The track is made of hardpack and own it origins to the RC Car shop that it was linked to in the 1970s. It is presently under the control of Losi and Gil Losi Sr. whose son is a former World Champion was key to the event happening.

== Results ==
=== 2WD ===
| | | | | Heat. | A1 | | A2 | | A3 | | Total | | | | |
| Pos. | Driver | Car | Motor | Heat. | Pos | Pos. | Pts | Pos. | Pts | Pos. | Pts | Total | Laps | Time | Av. Lap |
|---|---|---|---|---|---|---|---|---|---|---|---|---|---|---|---|
| 1 | (United States) Brian Kinwald | Losi XX 'CR' | Trinity | 3 | 5 | 6 | 1 | 10 | 1 | 10 | 20 | 24 | 10:03.76 | 25.16 | |
| 2 | (United States) Brian Dunbar | Losi XX 'CR' | GM Racing EVO2 | 9 | 8 | 3 | 2 | 9 | 2 | 9 | 18 | 24 | 10:06.02 | 25.25 | |
| 3 | (Japan) Masami Hirosaka | Associated RC10B3 | Reedy | 1 | 2 | 9 | 7 | 4 | 3 | 8 | 17 | 24 | 10:14.12 | 25.59 | |
| 4 | (United States) Scott Hughes | Associated RC10B3 | Reedy | A | 3 | 8 | 9 | 2 | 4 | 7 | 15 | 24 | 10:17.93 | 25.75 | |
| 5 | (United States) Scott Brown | Losi XX 'CR' | Trinity | A | 4 | 7 | 4 | 7 | 7 | 4 | 14 | 24 | 10:21.94 | 25.91 | |
| 6 | (United States) Greg Hodapp | Losi XX 'CR' | Trinity | A | 7 | 4 | 3 | 8 | 8 | 3 | 12 | 24 | 10:27.96 | 26.17 | |
| 7 | (United States) Jason Ruona | Associated RC10B3 | Reedy | 7 | 10 | 1 | 5 | 6 | 5 | 6 | 12 | 24 | 10:18.78 | 25.78 | |
| 8 | (United States) Mark Pavidis | Associated RC10B3 | Reedy | 8 | 1 | 10 | 10 | 1 | 10 | 1 | 11 | 24 | 10:27.63 | 26.15 | |
| 9 | (United States) Gabe Boudreau | Losi XX 'CR' | Trinity | 10 | 6 | 5 | 6 | 5 | 6 | 5 | 10 | 24 | 10:19.92 | 25.83 | |
| 10 | (United States) Mark Francis | Associated RC10B3 | Reedy | 6 | 9 | 2 | 8 | 3 | 9 | 2 | 5 | 24 | 10:31.95 | 26.33 | |

=== 4WD ===
| | | | | Heat. | A1 | | A2 | | A3 | | Total | | | | |
| Pos. | Driver | Car | Motor | Heat. | Pos | Pos. | Pts | Pos. | Pts | Pos. | Pts | Total | Laps | Time | Av. Lap |
|---|---|---|---|---|---|---|---|---|---|---|---|---|---|---|---|
| 1 | (Japan) Masami Hirosaka | Yokomo | Reedy | 1 | 1 | 10 | 1 | 10 | 7 | 4 | 20 | 26 | 10:14.07 | 23.62 | |
| 2 | (Finland) Jukka Steenari | Schumacher | Corally | 4 | 3 | 8 | 2 | 9 | 10 | 1 | 17 | 26 | 10:27.11 | 24.12 | |
| 3 | (Finland) Teemu Leino | Schumacher | Corally | 3 | 9 | 2 | 5 | 6 | 1 | 10 | 16 | 26 | 10:26.46 | 24.09 | |
| 4 | (United Kingdom) Craig Drescher | Yokomo | Reedy | 8 | 4 | 7 | 6 | 5 | 3 | 8 | 15 | 26 | 10:31.97 | 24.31 | |
| 5 | (United Kingdom) William Mitcham | TTech Predator | Maxtec | 5 | 8 | 3 | 4 | 7 | 4 | 7 | 14 | 26 | 10:31.11 | 24.27 | |
| 6 | (United States) Billy Easton | Yokomo | Reedy | 7 | 7 | 4 | 8 | 3 | 2 | 9 | 13 | 25 | 10:13.49 | 24.54 | |
| 7 | (United States) Mark Pavidis | Yokomo | Reedy | 2 | 2 | 9 | 7 | 4 | 9 | 2 | 13 | 26 | 10:33.73 | 24.37 | |
| 8 | (United States) Matt Francis | Losi | Trinity | 10 | 5 | 6 | 10 | 1 | 5 | 6 | 12 | 26 | 10:35.43 | 24.44 | |
| 9 | (United States) Rick Hohwart | Losi | Peak | 9 | 10 | 1 | 3 | 8 | 8 | 3 | 11 | 25 | 10:17.93 | 24.72 | |
| 10 | (United States) Greg Hodapp | Losi | Trinity | 6 | 6 | 5 | 9 | 2 | 6 | 5 | 10 | 25 | 10:24.66 | 24.99 | |
