= 1989 IFMAR 1:10 Electric Off-Road World Championships =

Event Information
- Event Title: 1989 IFMAR 1:10 Electric Off-Road World Championships
- Dates run: 5 - 10 September 1989

Club Information
- Venue: St Ives Showground
- Location: Sydney,
- Host country: Australia
- Surface: Dirt

Vehicle Specification
- Class: 1:10 Electric Offroad Buggy

2wd Title
- First: (Japan) Masami Hirosaka; Team Associated
- Second: (United States) Jay Halsey; Team Associated
- Third: (United States) Cliff Lett; Team Associated

4WD Title
- First: (Japan) Masami Hirosaka; Yokomo
- Second: (United States) Butch Kloeber; Yokomo
- Third: (United States) Rick Hohwart; Kyosho

1989 IFMAR 1:10 Electric Off-Road World Championships was the third edition of the 1:10 Electric Off-Road World Championship that took place in Australia at the St Ives Showground in Sydney between 4 and 10 September 1989.

== Classification ==
Note: A-main only.

=== 2WD ===
				Qual.	A1				A2				A3				Total		
Pos.	Driver	Car Maker	Motor	Qual.	Pos.	Laps	Time	Av Time	Pos.	Laps	Time	Av Time	Pos.	Laps	Time	Av Time	Laps	Time Total	Time Lap
1	(Japan) Masami Hirosaka	Associated RC10GX	Reedy Gold Star		1	17	311.23	18.31	1	17	316.65	18.63	2	17	314.45	18.50	34	625.68	18.4
2	(United States) Jay Halsey	Associated RC10GX	Reedy		2	17	314.04	18.47	9	16	319.09	19.94	1	17	314.29	18.49	34	627.23	18.45
3	(United States) Cliff Lett	Associated RC10GX	Reedy		5	16	302.88	18.93	2	17	318.79	18.75	3	17	316.45	18.61	34	635.24	18.68
4	(United States) Mike Dunn	Team Losi JR-X2	Race Prep		3	17	318.74	18.75	4	16	304.69	19.04	7	16	311.67	19.48	33	623.43	18.89
5	(United States) Rick Vehlow	Associated RC10GX	Reedy		7	16	306.4	19.15	3	16	301.34	18.83	6	16	309.55	19.35	32	607.74	18.99
6	(United Kingdom) Jamie Booth	Schumacher Top CAT	Reedy		6	16	304.9	19.06	6	16	312.21	19.51	4	16	306.46	19.15	32	611.36	19.11
7	(United Kingdom) Craig Drescher	Associated RC10 Graphite	Reedy		4	16	302.7	18.92	5	16	311.25	19.45	8	16	314.78	19.67	32	613.95	19.19
8	(United States) Jack Johnson	Team Losi JR-X2	Losi Revolution		8	16	307.81	19.24	8	16	317.26	19.83	5	16	309.49	19.34	32	617.3	19.29
9	(United States) Joel Johnson	Kyosho Ultima Pro	Trinity		9	16	309.75	19.36	7	16	315.30	19.71	9	16	317.13	19.82	32	625.05	19.53
10	(United States) Ron Rossetti	Team Losi JR-X2	Losi Revolution		10	16	315.53	19.72	10	16	323.69	20.23	10	15	301.25	20.08	32	639.21	19.98

=== 4WD ===
				Qual.	A1				A2				A3				Total		
Pos.	Driver	Car Maker	Motor	Qual.	Pos.	Laps	Time	Av Time	Pos.	Laps	Time	Av Time	Pos.	Laps	Time	Av Time	Laps	Time Total	Time Lap
1	(Japan) Masami Hirosaka	Yokomo YZ-870C	Reedy Gold Star		1	17	301.67	17.75	1	18	316.56	17.59	2	18	318.71	17.71	36	635.28	17.65
2	(United States) Butch Kloeber	Yokomo YZ-10	Reedy		3	17	309.91	18.23	2	17	302.12	17.77	1	18	318.50	17.69	35	620.62	17.73
3	(United States) Rick Hohwart	Kyosho Lazer ZX	Peak Performance		4	17	310.57	18.27	9	16	304.25	19.02	3	17	305.27	17.96	34	614.84	18.08
4	(United States) Cliff Lett	Yokomo YZ-10	Reedy		2	17	305.98	18.00	4	17	311.41	18.32	8	16	308.51	19.28	34	617.39	18.16
5	(West Germany) Jürgen Lautenbach	Schumacher Pro CAT	LRP		5	17	314.27	18.49	3	17	309.23	18.19	5	17	310.92	18.29	34	620.15	18.24
6	(United Kingdom) Phil Davies	Schumacher Pro CAT	Reedy		8	16	300.61	18.79	5	17	311.68	18.33	6	17	319.01	18.77	34	630.69	18.55
7	(United States) Mike Dunn	AYK Pro Radiant	Race Prep		6	17	317.39	18.67	7	17	317.45	18.67	10	9	164.19	18.24	34	634.84	18.67
8	(Japan) Satoshi Kayano	Yokomo YZ-870C	Reedy		7	17	319.19	18.78	8	17	317.63	18.68	7	16	303.82	18.99	34	636.82	18.73
9	(United Kingdom) Rory Cull	Schumacher Pro CAT	LRP		9	16	302.91	18.93	6	17	316.1	18.59	9	15	302.01	20.13	33	619.01	18.76
10	(United States) Jay Halsey	Yokomo YZ-10	Reedy		10	13	253.25	19.48	10	5	87	17.4	4	17	308.87	18.17	30	562.12	18.74
