= 1991 IFMAR 1:10 Electric Off-Road World Championships =

Event Information
- Event Title: 1991 IFMAR 1:10 Electric Off-Road World Championships
- Dates run: 4–11 August 1991

Club Information
- Club Name: Team SEMROCC Racing
- Venue: Freedom Hill Park
- Location: Sterling Heights, Michigan
- Host country: United States

Vehicle Specification
- Class: 1:10 Electric Offroad Buggy

2wd Title
- First: Masami Hirosaka (JPN); Associated - RC10B2

4WD Title
- First: Cliff Lett (USA); Yokomo - YZ-10

The 1991 IFMAR 1:10 Electric Off-Road World Championships was the fourth edition of the IFMAR 1:10 Electric Off-Road World Championship was held in United States in the city of Detroit from 4–11 August. The host club was SEMROCC Racing with the tracks location in Freedom Hill Park in the Sterling Heights area of the city. A large entry of over 120 drivers attended the event., October 1991

== 2WD Top 10 ==
				A1				A2				A3				Total
Pos.	Driver	Car	Motor	Pos.	No. Laps	Time	Pts	Pos.	No. Laps	Time	Pts	Pos.	No. Laps	Time	Pts	Total
1	Masami Hirosaka (JPN)	Associated; RC10	Reedy	5	12	5:30.36	6	2	12	5:11.39	9	1	12	5:13.43	10	19
2	Rick Vehlow (USA)	Associated; RC10	Reedy; Mr T	7	11	5:05.05	4	1	12	5:10.65	10	2	12	5:15.97	9	19
3	Kyle Reed (USA)	Losi; XX	Trinity	1	12	5:16.71	10	3	12	5:13.07	8	3	12	5:17.64	8	18
4	Kevin Moore (GBR)	Schumacher; Cougar	LRP	3	12	5:25.62	8	4	12	5:20.38	7	4	12	5:21.50	7	15
5	Mark Pavidis (USA)	Associated; RC10	Reedy; Mr M	2	12	5:23.62	9	8	11	5:05.84	3	8	11	5:09.16	3	12
6	Jurgen Lautenbach (GER)	Schumacher; Cougar	LRP; Blue SE	8	11	5:05.05	3	5	11	5:00.44	6	5	12	5:26.32	6	12
7	Satoshi Maezumi (JPN)	Associated; RC10	Atlas	4	12	5:26.36	7	6	11	5:04.28	5	9	11	5:12.07	2	12
8	Scott Montgomery (USA)	Traxxas TRX-1	Peak Performance; Marauder	9	11	5:10.14	2	7	11	5:04.28	4	6	11	5:01.91	5	9
9	Craig Drescher (GBR)	Associated; RC10	Reedy	6	11	5:02.42	5	9	11	5:20.70	2	7	11	5:07.17	4	9
10	Derek Furutani (USA)	Associated RC10	Peak Performance; Marauder	10	10	5:04.98	1	10	10	4:37.62	1	10	11	5:14.34	1	2

== 4WD Top 10 Results ==
				A1				A2				A3				Total
Pos.	Driver	Car	Motor	Pos.	No. Laps	Time	Pts	Pos.	No. Laps	Time	Pts	Pos.	No. Laps	Time	Pts	Total
1	Cliff Lett (USA)	Yokomo; YZ-10	Reedy; Mr M	1	12	5:05.98	10	2	12	5:05.38	9	2	12	5:06.50	9	19
2	Masami Hirosaka (JPN)	Yokomo	Reedy	2	12	5:07.53	9	5	12	5:18.10	6	1	12	5:05.61	10	19
3	Jack Johnson (USA)	Kyosho	Trinity	3	12	5:14.79	8	1	12	5:04.99	10	6	12	5:21.51	5	18
4	Joel Johnson (USA)	Kyosho	Trinity	4	12	5:15.25	7	7	11	4:50.34	4	3	12	5:17.89	8	15
5	Satoshi Maezumi (JPN)	Yokomo	Atlas; Pushed	9	12	5:22.61	2	4	12	5:15.53	7	4	12	5:21.30	7	14
6	Scott Anfinson (USA)	Yokomo	Reedy; Mr H	7	12	5:19.76	4	3	12	5:10.25	8	10	8	3:35.70	1	12
7	Kris Moore (USA)	Kyosho	Twister; 12T	5	12	5:15.96	6	9	11	5:02.20	2	7	12	5:11.52	4	10
8	Kevin Moore (GBR)	Schumacher	LRP; Pink	10	11	5:00.41	1	8	11	5:00.63	3	5	12	5:21.31	6	9
9	Mark Francis (USA)	Yokomo	Reedy; Mr H	8	12	5:22.54	3	6	12	5:24.06	5	9	11	5:15.90	2	8
10	Mike Dunn (USA)	Kyosho	Race Prep; 13	6	12	5:17.07	5	10	7	3:34.23	1	8	12	5:24.04	3	8
