= 1987 IFMAR 1:10 Electric Off-Road World Championships =

Coordinates: 51.026799°N 1.513816°W

Event Information
- Event Title: 1987 IFMAR 1:10 Electric Off-Road World Championships
- Dates run: 1987

Club Information
- Club Name: Romsey Offroad Club
- Location: ,
- Host country: United Kingdom
- Class: Electric

2wd Title
- First: Joel Johnson (USA)
- Second: Katsunori Kondo (JPN); Kyosho Ultima
- Third: Kris Moore (USA); Kyosho Ultima

4WD Title
- First: Masami Hirosaka (JPN); Schumacher; Cat XL
- Second: Katsunori Kondo (JPN); Kyosho; Mid Optima
- Third: Jamie Booth (GBR); Schumacher; Cat XL

The 1987 IFMAR/Parma 1:10 Electric Off-Road World Championship was the second edition of the IFMAR 1:10 Electric Off-Road World Championship that was held on the at now defunct Romsey Club which was based on the cite of the Malthouse Inn in Timsbury, Hampshire, near Southampton on the Central South Coast of England.

== Results ==
=== 2WD ===
				Qual	A1				A2				A3				Total
Pos.	Driver	Car	Motor	Qual	Pos.	No. Laps	Time	Av Time	Pos.	No. Laps	Time	Av Time	Pos.	No. Laps	Time	Av Time	No. Laps	Time Total	Time Lap
1	(United States) Joel Johnson	Kyosho Ultima	Trinity Pure Gold	3	1	16	318.5	19.91	6	15	312.63	20.84	2	15	300.3	20.02	31	618.8	19.96
2	(Japan) Katsunori Kondo	Kyosho Ultima	Kyosho Le Mans 240	5	5	15	306.15	20.41	4	15	305.23	20.35	1	16	318.98	19.94	31	624.21	20.14
3	(United States) Kris Moore	Kyosho Ultima	Twister	1	2	16	319.96	20.00	10	5	108.95	21.79	4	15	307.75	20.52	31	627.71	20.25
4	(United States) Mike Christensen	MIP RC10	Trinity	7	4	15	302.36	20.16	2	15	300.18	20.01	9	15	318.7	21.25	30	602.54	20.08
5	(United Kingdom) Jamie Booth	Associated RC10	Reedy	4	3	15	301.7	20.11	3	15	303.78	20.25	10	1	19.66	19.66	30	605.48	20.18
6	(United Kingdom) Kevin Moore	Associated RC10	Reedy	8	8	14	302.2	21.59	5	15	311.7	20.78	6	15	312.66	20.84	30	624.36	20.81
7	(United States) Jay Halsey	Associated RC10	Reedy Silver	2	7	14	301.83	21.56	7	15	315.13	21.01	5	15	310.38	20.69	30	635.51	21.18
8	(Japan) Masami Hirosaka	Associated RC10	HPI UNO Blue Label	6	10	9	196.85	21.87	10	15	323.51	21.57	3	15	304.83	20.32	30	628.34	20.94
9	(United Kingdom) Rory Cull	Associated RC10	Reedy	10	6	15	322.50	21.50	8	15	316.83	21.12	8	15	316.60	21.11	30	633.43	21.11
10	(United States) Eustace Moore	MIP RC10	Trinity	9	9	14	303.05	21.65	9	15	318.46	21.23	7	15	314.98	21	30	633.44	21.11

Pos	Name	Heat	Ref
11	Umberto Pernice (ITA)	B
12	Marco De Marchi (ITA)	B
13	Pete Stevens (GBR)	B
14	Cliff Lett (USA)	B
15	Mark O'Campo (USA)	B
16	Kazuhiro Koizumi (JPN)	B
17	Gil Losi (Jnr) (USA)	B
18	Paul Dionne (USA)	B
19	Butch Kloebter (USA)	B
20	Eric Soderquist (USA)	B
21	Mike Glen (USA)	C
22	Jack Johnson (USA)	C
23	Hiroyuki Matsumoto (JPN)	C
24	Mike Bridges	C
25	Eddie Knoles (USA)	C
26	Mike Martin (USA)	C
27	Ian Oddie (GBR)	C
28	Phil Davies (GBR)	C
29	Christian Keil (GER)	C
30	Tony Wells (GBR)	C
31	Stephen Kaske (GER)	D
32	Steve West (GBR)	D
33	Simon McRae (GBR)	D	D
34	Kazuhikp Nakanishi	D
35	Jerry Case	D
36	Atuhiro Ohno	D
37	Steve Haynes (GBR)	D
38	Steve Dunn (USA)	D
39	Mike Dunn (USA)	D
40	Chris Allec (USA)	E
41	Klaus Wilhelm (GER)	E
42	Tony Anderson (USA)	E
43	Ron Rossetti (USA)	E
44	Denis Blandin (FRA)	E
45	Larry Grant (USA)	E
46	Andrew Reade (AUS)	E
47	Joe Schmitz (USA)	E
48	Kevin Blears (GBR)	E
49	Junichi Koma (JPN)	E
50	Derek McLarney (GBR)	F
51	Peter Liu (USA)	F
52	Jeff Welch (USA)	F
53	Jean-Michel Fraisse (FRA)	F	F
54	Akira Kogawa	F
55	Kazuhiro Homma	F
56	Colin Grenenger	F
57	John Petarsen	F
58	Richard Isherwood	F
59	Thierry Grall	F
60	Hiroshi Nakamura	F
61	Neil Stringfello	G
62	Leo Barana	G
63	Darran Harris	G
64	Glyn Pegler	G
65	Kenichi Sakamoto	G
66	Bill Jeric	G
67	Bill Jones (USA)	G
68	Peter Neilson	G
69	Peter Smith	G
70	Ian McLarney	G
71	Tony Neisinger (USA)	H
72	Gary Kyes (USA)	H
73	Michael Seiner	H
74	Masaaki Kizuka	H
75	Richard Wilkinson	H
76	Alain Andre	H
77	Tim Raskin	H
78	Steve Newey	H
79	Tatsuo Yoshinaga	H
80	Kunsei Takeda	H
81	Tony Rossetti (USA)	I
82	Robert Smith	I
83	Jose Rosas	I
84	Takashi Aizawa	I
85	Brian Calder	I
86	Kar Man Leung	I
87	Jean-Pierre Glasse	I
88	Stephen Oberle	I
89	U. Milonesi	I
90	Craig Drescher (GBR)	I
91	Mark Ferguson	J
92	Mike Stephenson	J
93	Niki Kwong (HKG)	J
94	Andy Dobson	J
95	Jenson Spencer	J
96	Robert Novak	J
97	Jason Green	J
98	Guido Locher (SUI)	J
99	Christian Dauriax (FRA)	J
100	Nino Athanasiou (GBR)	J
101	Keith Young (USA)	K
102	Luc Bogaert (BEL)	K
103	David Hood (USA)	K
104	Tony Bovard (AUS)	K
105	Tom Lincklaen (NED)	K
106	Sven Hansson (SWE)	K
107	Eric Lavelatte (FRA)	K
108	Alex Vercammen	K
109	Eric Raymond (FRA)	K
110	Scott Salter (AUS)	K
111	Meryn Bonte (NED)	L
112	Markus Mathys (SUI)	L
113	Wolfgang Petermann (GER)	L
114	Robert French (AUS)	L
115	Hon Kuen Tsoi (HKG)	L
116	Paul Delaney	L
117	F. Ferraccioli	L
118	Gunnar Walinder (SWE)	L
119	Greg Fox (USA)	L
120	Michael Podiwinsky	L

=== 4WD ===
				Qual	A1				A2				A3				Total
Pos.	Driver	Car	Motor	Qual	Pos.	No. Laps	Time	Av Time	Pos.	No. Laps	Time	Av Time	Pos.	No. Laps	Time	Av Time	No. Laps	Time Total	Time Lap
1	(Japan) Masami Hirosaka	Schumacher CAT XL	HPI UNO Blue Label	A	1	17	314.63	18.51	3	16	306.56	19.16	4	16	304.25	19.02	33	618.88	18.75
2	(Japan) Katsunori Kondo	Kyosho Optima MID	Kyosho Le Mans 240HS	A	3	15	286.76	19.12	8	16	317.23	19.83	1	17	318.88	18.76	33	636.11	19.28
3	(United Kingdom) Jamie Booth	Schumacher CAT XL	Reedy	A	2	16	301.03	18.81	1	16	301.41	18.84	5	16	310.13	19.38	32	602.71	18.83
4	(United States) Cliff Lett	Schumacher CAT XL	Reedy Rouge	A	9	16	321.93	20.12	2	16	303.43	18.96	3	16	301.93	18.87	32	605.36	18.92
5	(United States) Joel Johnson	Kyosho Optima MID	Trinity Sprint	A	6	16	309.61	19.35	4	16	308.53	19.28	7	16	318.83	19.93	32	618.14	19.32
6	(United States) Jay Halsey	Yokomo prototype	Reedy Silver	A	5	16	309.48	19.34	5	16	310.46	19.4	8	5	94.03	18.81	32	619.94	19.37
7	(Japan) Junichi Koma	Kyosho Optima MID	Peak Performance	A	10	15	304.66	20.31	6	16	311.18	19.45	6	16	310.93	19.43	32	622.11	19.44
8	(United Kingdom) Pete Stevens	Kyosho Optima MID	Parma	A	7	16	312.09	19.51	9	16	317.68	19.86	8	16	321	20.06	32	630.58	19.71
9	(United States) Eric Soderquist	Kyosho Optima MID	Twister	A	4	16	307.98	19.25	7	15	295.13	19.68	10	-.---	0	-.---	31	603.11	19.46
10	(United States) Mike Christensen	MIP RC10	Trinity		8	15	301.43	20.1	10	10	214.63	21.46	9	4	86.45	21.61	25	519.29	20.77

Pos	Name	Heat	Ref
11	Marco De Marchi (ITA)	B
12	Ian Littley (GBR)	B
13	Tony Neisinger (USA)	B
14	Jurgen Metz (GER)	B
15	Glyn Pegler (GBR)	B
16	Stephan Kohler (GER)	B
17	Hiroyuki Matsumo (JPN)	B	B
18	Gil Losi (Jnr) (USA)	B
19	Eustace Moore (GBR)	B
20	Umberto Pernice (ITA)	B
21	Steve Haynes (GBR)	C
22	Mark O'Campo (USA)	C
23	Ian Oddie (GBR)	C
24	Jean-Michel Fraisse (FRA)	C
25	Paul Dionne (USA)	C
26	Darran Harris (GBR)	C
27	Ron Rossenti (USA)	C
28	Kunsei Takeda	C
29	Denis Blandin	C
30	Chris Allec (USA)	C
31	Nino Athanasiou	D
32	Colin Grenenger	D
33	Mike Glem	D
34	Eddie Knoles	D
35	Jason Green	D
36	Simon McRae (GBR)	D
37	Otto Ganss (GER)	D
38	Kazuhiro Homma	D
39	Mike Dunn (USA)	D
40	Jack Johnson (USA)	E
41	Klaus Wilhelm (GER)	E
42	Butch Kloebter (USA)	E
43	Kazuhiro Koizumi (JPN)	E
44	Tony Rossenti (USA)	E
45	Thierry Grall	E
46	Takashi Rizana	E
47	Gary Kyes (USA)	E
48	Stephan Blueml	E
49	Steve Dunn (USA)	E
50	P. Ansaloni	F
51	Andrew Bolton (AUS)	F
52	Jow Schmitz (USA)	F
53	Tony Wells	F
54	Patrick Garpi	F
55	Masaaki Masaaki	F
56	Michael Toms	F
57	Philippe Neidhart (SUI)	F
58	Sylvain Cachard (FRA)	F
59	Greg Fox	F
60	Kazukiko Nakanishi (JPN)	F
61	Kris Moore (GBR)	G
62	Scott Kennedy	G
63	Richard Isherwood	G
64	Georges Bohdanowicz (FRA)	G
65	Jerry Case	G
66	Larry Grant	G
67	Alex Vercammen (BEL)	G
68	Akira Kohgawa	G
69	Mike Martin	G
70	Leo Barana	G
71	Stephan Oberle	H
72	Kevin Blears	H
73	Tony Anderson	H
74	Stephan Kaske	H
75	Andrew Reade	H
76	Kenichi Sakamoto (JPN)	H
77	Atuhiro Ohno	H
78	Bill Jeric	H
79	Tatsuo Yoshinaga	H
80	Jose Rosas	H
81	Greg Collings	I
82	Ad Van Schaarden	I
83	Peter Smith	I
84	Stephan Ko (HKG)	I
85	Jeff Welch (USA)	I
86	Luc Bogaert (BEL)	I
87	Michael Podiwinsky (AUT)	I
88	Christian Sterr (GER)	I
89	Sven Hansson (SWE)	I
90	Michael Selner (AUT)	I
91	Robert Smith	J
92	Derek McLarney	J
93	Niki Kwong	J
94	Tom Lincklaen	J
95	Scott Salter	J
96	Kurt Steinbuchel	J
97	Kar Man Leung	J
98	John Petarsen	J
99	Robin Reade	J
100	Tim Raskin	J
101	Mark Luney	K
102	Egil Holth	K
103	Robert Novak	K
104	Frederick Mathiesen (SWE)	K
105	Jan Schelling	K
106	Guy Evans	K
107	Peter Liu	K
108	Keith Young	K
109	Jacques Taillens (SUI)	K
110	Gil Losi (Snr) (USA)	K
111	Spongia	L
112	Cia	L
113	Kam Hung Chan	L
114	Paul Delaney	L
115	Hiroshi Nakamura	L
116	Peter Neilson (USA)	L
117	Terje Brynhildse	L
118	Hon Kuen Tsoi (HKG)	L
119	David Hood (USA)	L
