= 2001 IFMAR 1:10 Electric Off-Road World Championships =

Electric Off-Road World that was held back due to the september 11 attacks

Event Information
- Event Title: 2001/2002 IFMAR 1:10 Electric Off-Road World Championships
- Dates run: 2002

Club Information
- Club Name: Tshwane Raceway And Promotions
- Location: ,

Vehicle Specification
- Class: 1:10 Electric Offroad Buggy

2wd Title
- First: Matt Francis (USA)
- Second: Brian Kinwald (USA)
- Third: Neil Cragg (GBR)

4WD Title
- First: Jukka Steenari (FIN)
- Second: Matt Francis (USA)
- Third: Greg Hodapp (USA)

The 2002 IFMAR 1:10 Electric Off-Road World Championships was the ninth edition of the IFMAR 1:10 Electric Off-Road World Championship, sanctioned by the International Federation of Model Auto Racing. It was meant to be held in 2001. However the event was delayed until 2002 due to the events of September 11 in America. The event was held in Pretoria, South Africa at the Tshwane Raceway and Promotion race facility.

== Top 10 - 2WD Results ==
Pos	Qual	Name	Car	Motor
1	2	Matt Francis (USA)	Losi; XXX	Trinity
2	3	Brian Kinwald (USA)	Losi; XXX	Trinity
3	6	Neil Cragg (GBR)	Associated; B3	Reedy
4	5	Travis Amezcua (USA)	Losi; XXX	Peak Performance
5	2	Mark Pavidis (USA)	Associated; B3	Reedy
6	7	Brian Dunbar (USA)	Losi; XXX	SMC
7	4	Billy Easton (USA)	Associated; B3	Reedy
8	9	Adam Drake (USA)	Losi; XXX	Trinity
9	10	Craig Drescher (GBR)	Associated; B3	Reedy
10	8	Greg Hodapp (USA)	Losi; XXX	Peak Performance

== Top 10 - 4WD Results ==
Pos	Qual	Name	Car	Motor
1	2	Jukka Steenari (FIN)	Losi; XX4	Orion
2	1	Matt Francis (USA)	Losi; Prototype	Trinity
3	6	Greg Hodapp (USA)	Losi; XX4	Peak Performance
4	3	Travis Amezcua (USA)	Losi; Prototype	Peak Performance
5	8	Dave Montgomery (USA)	Losi; Prototype	Orion
6	5	Mark Pavidis (USA)	Durango; 0	Reedy
7	9	Peter Pinisch (AUT)	Losi; XX4	Reedy
8	10	Neil Cragg (GBR)	Schumacher; 0	Reedy
9	7	Todd Hodge (USA)	Losi; XX4	Trinity
10	4	Craig Drescher (GBR)	Schumacher; 0	Reedy
