= KO PROPO =

Japanese technology company

Kondo Kagaku co., ltd
- Native name: 近藤科学株式会社
- Founded: September 1, 1964
- Founder: Kinjiro Kondo
- Headquarters: Arakawa, Tokyo, Japan
- Key people: Hirotoshi Kondo
- Brands: KO Propo; Digiace (defunct)
- Total assets: 5,000,000,000 JPY
- Number of employees: 24
- Website: kopropo.com

KO PROPO is a brand of radio control equipment and humanoid robot (KHR-1) by Kondo Kagaku, established in Tokyo, Japan in 1945.

In 1982 KO PROPO introduced the Expert EX-1, reported to have been the first to integrate a pistol grip into a transmitter device with a gun trigger to act as the throttle, which later became a popular fixture in radio controlled transmitters.

As of 2016 the company had won 32 IFMAR World titles.
