= Novak Electronics =

American radio control electronics manufacturer

- Trade name: Novak R/C
- Formerly: Novak Electronics
- Founder: Bob Novak
- Defunct: June 13, 2016
- Headquarters: Irvine, California, United States
- Key people: Linda Novak Logan and Laura Novak-Roesgen, Adnan Khan
- Website: no longer active

Novak Electronics, Inc. of Irvine, California was a manufacturer of radio control electronics.

Founded by radio control enthusiast and electronics engineer Bob Novak, Novak Electronics originally manufactured servos. Novak Electronics was primarily known for its line of electronic speed controls for electric land vehicles and boats.

The companies' product line expanded to include:

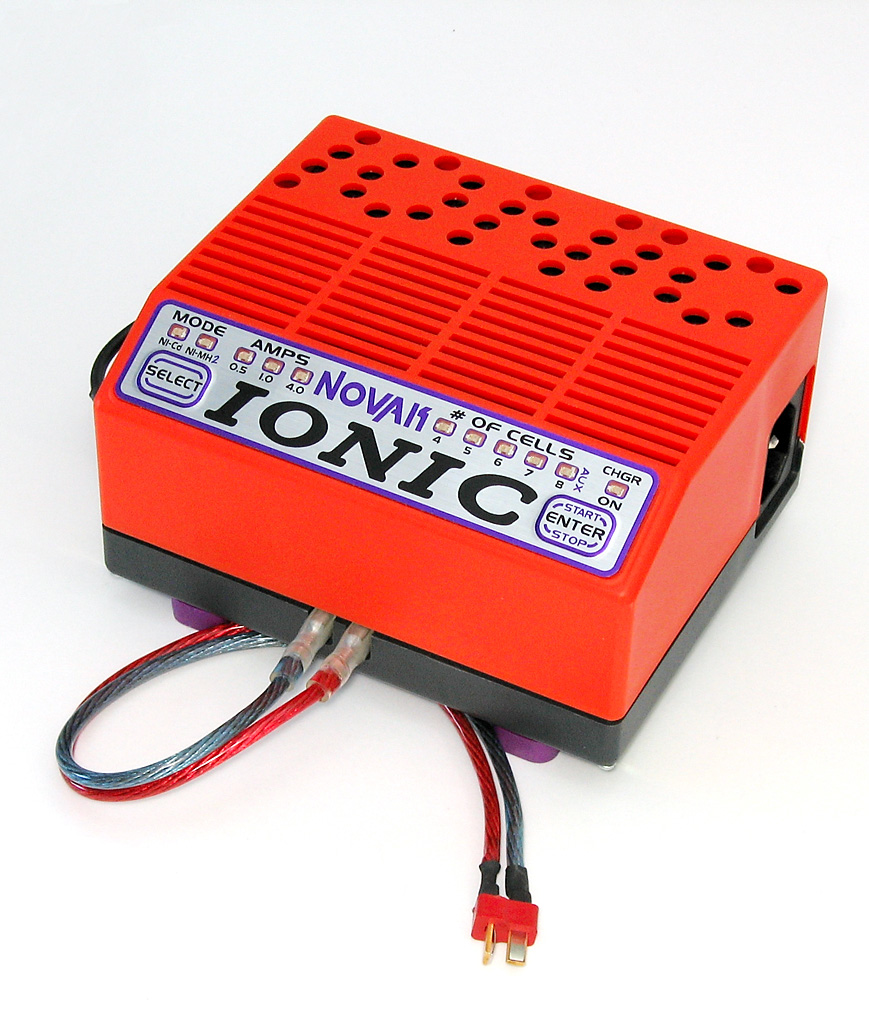
Novak Ionic AC/DC battery charger

- Battery chargers
- Synthesized receivers
- Transmitter modules
- Power supplies
- Brushless motor systems
- Brushless-specific batteries and dischargers

Novak Electronics had a 35,000 square foot (or 3252 square meter) robotic manufacturing facility with a team of engineers and RC racers. This facility made it one of the few American electronics manufacturers to design, build, and test its products onsite.

In January 2014, the company changed its name to Novak R/C. At the same time, Bob Novak split ownership of company between his daughters Linda Novak Logan and Laura Novak-Roesgen, and the company's engineering director, Adnan Khan. Novak R/C later announced a partnership with Hobbico and Great Planes.

Its "Team Novak" racing division has won 20 IFMAR World Champion titles.

Novak R/C was the last American manufacturer to produce radio-controlled products in the United States.

On June 13, 2016, the company announced it was closing after 38 years.
