= Brian Kinwald =

American professional remote control car driver

Brian Kinwald (October 6, 1973 – April 3, 2019) was an American professional radio control car driver. He was born in Huntington Beach, California and grew up riding competitive BMX. Brian competed in BMX through his early teenage years until switching to R/C racing at the age of 15. He lived in Tempe, Arizona.

Kinwald is a two-time IFMAR - IFMAR 1:10 Electric Off-Road World Championship World Champion, winning the 2wd mod buggy class in 1993 with Team Associated, and winning the same class again in 1997 with Team Losi. His contribution to the sport far exceeded his driving achievement as he later developed new tire technologies for JConcepts which revolutionized the sport.
