= Graupner (company) =

German RC equipment manufacturer

- Company type: Private
- Industry: RC model manufacturer
- Founded: 1930; 96 years ago in Stuttgart, Germany
- Founder: Johannes Graupner
- Fate: Purchased by SJ Inc.
- Headquarters: Kirchheim unter Teck, Germany
- Website: graupner.co.kr

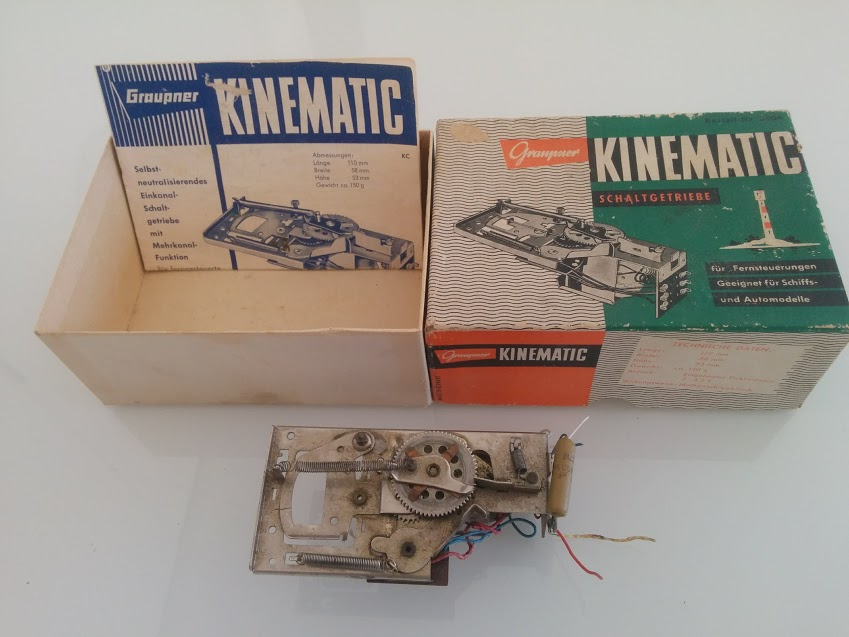
"Kinematic" RC escapement made by Graupner, ca. 1965.

Graupner/SJ GmbH is a radio control equipment manufacturing company founded in 1930 by Johannes Graupner in Stuttgart-Wangen. Taken over in 1953 by son Hans, the company became the leading designer and producer of aircraft and boat radio-controlled models. Providing the world RC market with RC radios and on board sensor equipment, it was purchased from receivership in 2013 by South Korean manufacturer SJ Ltd.In 2014, the name of SJ Inc. was changed to Graupner Co.Ltd., henceforth the name Graupner referring to the South Korean company.

== History ==
Graupner was founded by Johannes Graupner in Stuttgart in 1930 as a scale model manufacturer. Two years later, the company was moved to Kirchheim unter Teck. In 1935, the first glider model was introduced, and in 1938, the first building plans and materials for ship scale modeling were produced. In 1954 the first radio-controlled models were introduced.

After the conclusion of World War II, Johannes Graupner filed permits to reopen the firm. The first products offered after the re-opening were eighteen different toys and crafts plans and kitchen utensils. In 1950, building plans and accessories for model aircraft were offered for sale, along with model train accessories such as scale buildings and landscape materials. In addition to a U.K. developed compression ignition (diesel) model engine, a German developed model diesel named Taifun-Standard (Typhoon) was marketed in 1952. Two years later, the company sold the first German model radio controllers.

Hans Graupner took responsibility for the further development of the company at the death of his father in 1953. In 1954, Graupner GmbH made its first appearance at the Nuremberg International Toy Fair.

The company's success and popularity continued, when in 1962, a new building was constructed for the firm.

Due to increasing competition from Asia, Graupner went bankrupt in 2012 and was taken over by SJ incorporated, which had supplied radio control units to Graupner in the past. The company continues as a sales organisation.
