= Ryan Maifield =

American remote controlled car driver

2005 1:10 Electric Off Road 2WD Winner Neil Cragg (center), Ryan Cavalieri (left), and Ryan Maifield

Ryan Maifield (born 20 September 1986) is a professional remote control car driver from Tempe, Arizona, who currently races for Tekno RC, ProTek RC, JConcepts, amain.com, Hobbywing, Sanwa, Hobby Action Raceway, Stickit1 Racing, VP Racing, and Flashpoint. He formerly drove many successful years for Team Losi, Team Associated, Mugen-Seiki, and Yokomo. He is a two-time ROAR Champion in the 1/8 gas buggy division as well as a multi-time champion in the 1/10 offroad classes. He won the 2017 IFMAR world championships in both 2WD and 4WD in Xiamen, China.
