= Ryan Cavalieri =

American radio controlled car driver

2005 1:10 Electric Off Road 2WD Winner Neil Cragg (center), Ryan Cavalieri (left), and Ryan Maifield.

Ryan Cavalieri is a professional remote control car driver from Southern California he has won four IFMAR World Champion titles and more than 30 national titles. He has worked with most major RC Brands with cars by Team Associated, WRC Works and Schumacher. His electronics partner has also been varied including Team Orion and Hobbywing.
