= Cliff Lett =

American radio-controlled racer

- Born: Clifton Bradley Lett; September 18, 1957 (age 68); Long Beach, California
- Occupations: Radio-controlled racer Hobby industry executive Motorcycle mechanic
- Employer(s): Yamaha; Associated Electrics

Clifton Bradley Lett (born September 18, 1957) is an American retired radio-controlled racer and former president of Associated Electrics, where he began his R/C career in 1985. A former motocross mechanic for Yamaha (particularly for Ricky Johnson), he won seven ROAR National Championships, three NORRCA National Championships and the 1991 IFMAR World Championship and was one of the foremost drivers of the 1980s. Lett, known as "the Buggymaster", helped refine the Associated RC10 and other models in the range. He was the first driver to exceed 100 miles per hour (160 km/h) with a radio-controlled car, recorded by Guinness World Records at 111 miles per hour (179 km/h) in 2001.

== Early life ==
Lett spent most of his youth in Los Altos. From age 12 to 15, he raced BMX bikes and was part of the Matthews Motocross team with Scot Breithaupt (his best friend's cousin). Lett competed in motocross and played baseball in high school, giving up baseball for a career in motocross.

Shortly after his mother died of cancer, Lett gave up racing and was a mechanic for Yamaha's amateur and semi-pro riders. He became Ricky Johnson's personal mechanic in 1983, when Johnson negotiated a contract enabling Lett to work with him; their partnership ended after the 1985 season when Johnson moved to Honda. Lett then helped develop engines and suspensions; in his last year with Yamaha, he worked in research and development of YZ motorcycles.

== Radio-controlled career ==
Lett entered the radio-controlled hobby with a gasoline-powered airplane, bringing it on tour and flying as time permitted. His first radio-controlled car was an Associated RC12E. During Lett's travels, he raced the car in parking lots until rider Johnny O'Mara destroyed it by driving it under a moving car. In November 1984, after watching an off-road race on a business trip, he bought a Cox Tomahawk at Hobby Shack and won his first race. When Lett became a mechanic, he worked away from home on weekends and in the office during the week; racing became less frequent until 1986, when he began working in research and development.

When he came across an event near Whittier, California in 1985, Lett was introduced to racer Jay Halsey and contacted Associated Electrics executives Mike Reedy, Roger Curtis and Gene Husting. In April 1988, when a position became available in Team Associated's research and development department, he became a product-development manager. The RC10 had begun to show its age, and Lett helped make the car competitive again.

== Racing career ==
At the 1991 IFMAR 1:10 Electric Off-Road World Championships, Team Associated had built a series of new RC10s for the 2WD class weeks before and had little time to prepare. After a poor practice performance with two practice days left, Lett split the team into groups of three and four; one group focused on front-end development, a second on rear-end development and a third on tires. The arrangement succeeded, and Masami Hirosaka won his second IFMAR 2WD world championship.

In the 4WD class Lett qualified his Yokomo YZ-10 in sixth place, despite losing his fastest qualifying time for failing to marshal a round after his. He fought out the first leg of the A-Main (the finals that claims the championship title) with Hirosaka, who held the lead in the five-minute round until he made an error which allowed Lett to win. In the second leg, as Hirosaka made mistakes which left him in fourth place and reduced his chances of contending for the championship, Lett tried to fend off Jack Johnson's Kyosho Lazer ZX-R. He rolled his car on the seventh lap, enabling Johnson to pass, and finished second. In the final leg, Lett needed to finish third or better to secure the title. After an error by Johnson, he and Hirosaka were the only remaining contenders. With the lowest points deducted from each driver's final score, they were tied; their lowest scores were used to break the tie. Hirosaka's fifth-place finish in the second leg was lower than Lett's second, and Lett was declared champion.

== Record attempt ==
Lett's Team Associated RC10L3O
- Category: PRO 10
- Constructor: Associated Electrics
- Designer: Cliff Lett

Technical specifications
- Electric motor: 2T Aveox brushless rear-mounted
- Battery: 24 2/3A cells NiCad
- Weight: 2,100 g (74.1 oz)

Competition history
- Notable entrants: Team Associated
- Notable drivers: Cliff Lett

Before Lett's attempt, the fastest recorded time—59 miles per hour (95 km/h)—was set by Audi Sports in Finland. By 2001, George M. Gonzalez of Radio Control Car Action claimed that a car with a .21 (3.5cc) glow-plug engine was capable of that speed. That year Steve Pond reached 101 miles per hour (163 km/h) with his HPI Super Nitro RS4, as recorded for Radio Control Nitro magazine with a radar gun. R/C drag-racing champion Chris Collins reportedly reached 112.7 miles per hour (181.4 km/h) at the Northstar Dragway in Minnesota, and record-breaking speeds were reached in organized events at the Olympic Velodrome at California State University; however, none were certified and the Finnish record stood.

Lead designer Lett attempted a new record on January 13, 2001, aiming to exceed 100 miles per hour (160 km/h) over a two way pass with the help of Team Associated, promoter Dan Moynihan and Irwindale Speedway. He used a modified TC3 and a RC10L3O, the latter adapted to accommodate an Aveox sensorless brushless motor designed for aircraft and fed by 24 sub-C NiCad batteries. The body was a 1/10 version of a Nissan P35 by Protoform, modified to reduce drag. Further modification was made over five days to prevent the body from deforming at speed, adding a wing from a 1/10 buggy for increased downforce and straightaway stability.

To certify the record, Lett needed a Guinness World Records representative at the event or its recording by Guinness World Records Primetime. Although Moynihan encouraged the show's producers to attend, its film crew pulled out at the last minute. An ABC News crew recorded the event, with a speed of 111 miles per hour (179 km/h) read on a Stalker police-radar gun. The event was broadcast on television, and video footage and radar data were submitted to Guinness.

The TC3, built to break Audi's record with a production-based vehicle, had a NASCAR-style Dodge Intrepid body and 14 batteries. It reached the high 80s and low 90s, until Mike Reedy built a motor enabling it to reach 96.4 miles per hour (155.1 km/h).

Lett was the first driver to exceed 100 miles per hour (160 km/h) with a radio-controlled car, according to Guinness World Records. He held the record until it was broken by Nic Case in 2006 at 134.4 miles per hour (216.3 km/h), and in 2014 Case was the first to reach 200 miles per hour (320 km/h).

== Recognition ==
With Joel Johnson, Gil Losi, Jr. and Jay Halsey, Lett is considered by Radio Control Car Action's Steve Pond as one of the 1980s' star drivers and he was cited as an inspiration by Ricky Johnson. In Radio Control Car Action's annual top-10 poll, Lett was listed twice (in 1989 and 1993) on its Best R/C Drivers list.

== R/C racing summary ==
Bold in results indicates top qualifier.

=== IFMAR world championship results ===
Year	Result	Class	Venue	Car	Motor	Source	Report
1987	14	1:10 Electric Off-Road 2WD	Romsey	Associated RC10			report
1987	4	1:10 Electric Off-Road 4WD	Romsey	Schumacher CAT XL	Reedy Rouge		report
1989	3	1:10 Electric Off-Road 2WD		Associated RC10GX			report
1989	4	1:10 Electric Off-Road 4WD		Yokomo YZ-10			report
1991		1:10 Electric Off-Road 2WD		Associated RC10GX			report
1991	1	1:10 Electric Off-Road 4WD		Yokomo YZ-10			report
1995	7	1:10 Electric Off-Road 2WD		Associated RC10B			report
1996		1:8 IC Off-Road		Kyosho Inferno MP5			report
1997	32	1:10 Electric Off-Road 2WD					report
1997	27	1:10 Electric Off-Road 4WD					report

=== ROAR national championship results ===
Year	Result	Class	Venue	Car	Motor	Source	Report
1988	1	1:10 Oval 4WD					report
1988	1	1:10 Off-Road Stock 4WD					report
1988	1	1:10 Electric Off-Road 2WD					report
1988		1:10 Electric Off-Road 4WD					report
1989	3	1:10 Electric Off-Road 2WD					report
1989	4	1:10 Electric Off-Road 4WD					report
1990	1	1:10 Electric Off-Road 2WD					report
1990	1	1:10 Electric Off-Road 4WD					report
