= 2015 IFMAR 1:10 Electric Off-Road World Championship – 2WD =

The 2WD class of the 2015 IFMAR 1:10 Electric Off-Road World Championship commencing on the 4 October and concluding on the 6 October at the Yatabe Arena in Tsukuba in the Ibaraki Prefecture, Japan .

== Qualifying ==
Pos.	Driver	Car—Motor	Q1	Q2	Q3	Q4	Q5	Score	Heat
1			00:00.000	00:00.000	00:00.000	00:00.000	00:00.000		A

== Race ==
=== A-main ===
					A1					A2					A3					Total	
Pos.	No	Driver	Car	Motor	Pos.	Time	Laps	FL	Pt.	Pos.	Time	Laps	FL	Pt.	Pos.	Time	Laps	FL	Pt.	Pt.	Time
1	3	(United States) Spencer Rivkin	Associated RC10B5M	Reedy	2	5:01.181	17		2	1	5:16.137	18		1	1	5:15.551	18		1	2	
2	1	(United States) Jared Tebo	Kyosho Ultima RZ6	Orion	1	5:14.709	18		1	4	5:03.793	17		4	3	5:01.535	17		3	4	
3	4	(United States) Ryan Cavalieri	Associated RC10B5M	Orion	3	5:02.505	17		3	2	5:01.328	17		2	2	5:00.830	17		2	4	
4	2	(United Kingdom) Neil Cragg	Associated RC10B5M	Reedy	6	5:09.235	17		6	3	5:01.978	17		3	4	5:02.951	17		4	7	
5	6	(Germany) Jörn Neumann	Serpent Spyder SRX-2 MM	Orion	5	5:06.651	17		5	9	5:11.622	17		9	5	5:06.129	17		5	10	
6	7	(United States) Ryan Maifield	TLR 22	Orion	4	5:04.911	17		4	7	5:07.407	17		7	9	4:02.679	13		9	11	
7	9	(Czech Republic) Martin Bayer	XRAY XB2 2015	Orca	9	5:16.223	17		9	5	5:07.079	17		5	6	5:06.884	17		6	11	
8	10	(United States) Kody Numedahl	Associated RC10B5M	Reedy	10	5:18.247	17		10	6	5:07.375	17		6	8	4:35.361	15		8	14	
9	8	(Poland) Michal Orlowski	Schumacher Cougar KF2	Speed Passion	7	5:11.246	17		7	10	5:14.934	15		10	7	5:10.475	17		7	14	
10	5	(United Kingdom) Lee Martin	Yokomo YZ-2	Muchmore	8	5:15.735	17		8	8	5:10.982	17		8	10	0.000	0		10	16	

=== B-main ===
					Total		
Pos.	No	Driver	Car	Motor	Time	Laps	FL
1							
2							
3							
4							
5							
6							
7							
8							
9							
10							

=== C-main ===
					Total		
Pos.	No	Driver	Car	Motor	Time	Laps	FL
1							
2							
3							
4							
5							
6							
7							
8							
9							
10							

=== D-main ===
					Total		
Pos.	No	Driver	Car	Motor	Time	Laps	FL
1							
2							
3							
4							
5							
6							
7							
8							
9							
10							

=== E-main ===
					Total		
Pos.	No	Driver	Car	Motor	Time	Laps	FL
1							
2							
3							
4							
5							
6							
7							
8							
9							
10							

=== F-main ===
					Total		
Pos.	No	Driver	Car	Motor	Time	Laps	FL
1							
2							
3							
4							
5							
6							
7							
8							
9							
10							

=== G-main ===
					Total		
Pos.	No	Driver	Car	Motor	Time	Laps	FL
1							
2							
3							
4							
5							
6							
7							
8							
9							
10							

=== H-main ===
					Total		
Pos.	No	Driver	Car	Motor	Time	Laps	FL
1							
2							
3							
4							
5							
6							
7							
8							
9							
10							

=== I-main ===
					Total		
Pos.	No	Driver	Car	Motor	Time	Laps	FL
1							
2							
3							
4							
5							
6							
7							
8							
9							
10							

=== J-main ===
					Total		
Pos.	No	Driver	Car	Motor	Time	Laps	FL
1							
2							
3							
4							
5							
6							
7							
8							
9							
10							

=== K-main ===
					Total		
Pos.	No	Driver	Car	Motor	Time	Laps	FL
1							
2							
3							
4							
5							
6							
7							
8							
9							
10							

=== L-main ===
					Total		
Pos.	No	Driver	Car	Motor	Time	Laps	FL
1							
2							
3							
4							
5							
6							
7							
8							
9							
10							

=== M-main ===
					Total		
Pos.	No	Driver	Car	Motor	Time	Laps	FL
1							
2							
3							
4							
5							
6							
7							
8							
9							
10							

=== N-main ===
					Total		
Pos.	No	Driver	Car	Motor	Time	Laps	FL
1	1	Back Hee, Lee			5:12.390	15	19.767
2	2	Koivuranta, Kai			5:03.540	14	19.764
3	4	Komada, Masanori			5:05.386	14	19.991
4	5	Lin, Chien-Fa			5:06.827	14	20.228
5	6	Hoshino, Mami			5:10.376	14	21.037
6	3	Yen, Jung-Nan			5:16.906	14	20.158
7	8	Foong, WK			5:17.718	14	21.038
8	7	Takahashi, Seiichi			5:18.360	14	20.447
9	9	Teramoto, Koichiro			5:01.049	13	20.931
10	10	Tomita, Naomi			5:02.876	13	21.075
11	11	Rosado, Thierry			5:13.412	13	21.455
12	12	Ido, Masatsugu			2:12.592	6	19.119

			Qual	Finals					Ref
Pos.	Driver	Car	Qual	Pos.	Time	Laps	FL	Pt.	Ref
11	Elliott Boots (GBR)		12	B-1	17	5:05.137	17.34	1	
12	Dakotah Phend (USA)		15	B-2	17	5:07.719	17.34	2	
13	Joona Haatanen (FIN)		16	B-3	17	5:07.998	17.38	3	
14	Kyle McBride (AUS)		13	B-4	17	5:08.401	17.354	4	
15	Steven Hartson (USA)		18	B-5	17	5:11.722	17.301	5	
16	Patrick Hofer (SUI)		17	B-6	17	5:13.671	17.693	6	
17	Yusuke Sugiura (JPN)		11	B-7	17	5:14.453	17.574	7	
18	Carson Wernimont (USA)		19	B-8	17	5:17.086	17.617	8	
19	Kohta Akimoto (JPN)		20	B-9	16	5:05.549	17.765	9	
20	Naoto Matsukura (JPN)	Kyosho; Ultima RB6 WC	14	B-10	16	5:14.79	17.735	10	
21	Hupo Hoenigl (AUT)		21	C-1	17	5:08.171	17.613	1	
22	Dustin Evans (USA)	Losi; 22-4	22	C-2	17	5:16.107	17.448	2	
23	Hayato Matsuzaki (JPN)		29	C-3	17	5:18.594	17.701	3	
24	Kaito Kodera (JPN)		25	C-4	16	5:01.052	17.577	4	
25	Jesper Rasmussen (DEN)		28	C-5	16	5:03.074	17.69	5	
26	Chris Sturdy (AUS)		30	C-6	16	5:03.229	17.912	6	
27	Marc Rheinard (GER)		23	C-7	16	5:04.049	17.686	7	
28	Bruno Coelho (POR)		26	C-8	14	4:31.951	17.821	8	
29	Tom Cockerill (GBR)		24	C-9	8	2:32.178	18.143	9	
30	Craig Collinson (GBR)	Team C TM2 V2	27	C-10	2	0:47.057	18.44	10	
31	Travis Amezcua (USA)	Durango; DEX210F	31	D-1	17	5:15.639	17.796	1	
32	Ty Tessmann (CAN)		32	D-2	17	5:17.625	17.863	2	
33	Ben Jemison (GBR)		40	D-3	16	5:03.222	17.984	3	
34	Kazuki Sasatsu (JPN)		33	D-4	16	5:05.68	17.797	4	
35	Zacarias Villalba (ESP)		39	D-5	16	5:10.823	17.954	5	
36	Raymond Munday (AUS)		37	D-6	16	5:12.145	17.956	6	
37	Juriya Kajiwara (JPN)		38	D-7	16	5:13.22	17.828	7	
38	Malin Karlsen (SWE)		34	D-8	16	5:16.553	18.496	8	
39	Richard Lowe (GBR)		36	D-9	14	4:20.445	17.845	9	
40	Shiniosuke Adachi (JPN)		35	D-10	0	0:00	0	10	
41	Joshua Pain (AUS)	Yokomo; YZ-2	41	E-1	16	5:01.29	18.045	1	
42	Sylvain Gallo Selva (FRA)		44	E-2	16	5:04.596	18.235	2	
43	Nana Kaiho (JPN)		43	E-3	16	5:07.604	18.46	3	
44	Kai Kikuchi (JPN)		42	E-4	16	5:10.803	18.15	4	
45	Daisuke Sakamoto (JPN)		46	E-5	16	5:11.685	18.363	5	
46	Kyle Moon (GBR)		48	E-6	16	5:12.098	18.14	6	
47	Billy Easton (USA)	Serpent; Spyder SRX-2 MH	E-7	16	5:15.864	18.029	7		
48	Nathan Ralls (GBR)		49	E-8	16	5:17.955	18.2	8	
49	Andrew Smolnik (USA)	PR Racing; PRS1 V3	47	E-9	15	5:02.566	18.2	9	
50	Peter Forster (SUI)		45	E-10	11	3:37.833	18.479	10	
51	Bartomiej Zambrzycki (POL)		52	F-1	16	5:05.5	18.399	1	
52	David Ronnefalk (SWE)		56	F-2	16	5:12.179	17.969	2	
53	Fabian Widmer (SUI)		53	F-3	16	5:15.331	18.503	3	
54	Oliver De Montfumat (FRA)		57	F-4	16	5:18.064	18.757	4	
55	Guan-Shian Chen (TWN)		58	F-5	16	5:19.129	18.587	5	
56	Ju Won Kyou (KOR)		60	F-6	15	5:00.912	18.284	6	
57	Frederik Hovgaard (DEN)		51	F-7	15	5:01.974	18.058	7	
58	Brett Birch (GBR)		55	F-8	15	5:02.461	18.748	8	
59	Frederic Pain (FRA)		53	F-9	15	5:10.651	18.524	9	
60	Hayate Obokata (JPN)		59	F-10	5	1:49.991	18.791	10	
61	Kevin Lee (GBR)		61	G-1	16	5:16.075	18.185	1	
62	Jonathan Yeung (HKG)		67	G-2	15	5:01.929	18.607	2	
63	Mathieu Chaffardon (FRA)		64	G-3	15	5:06.873	19.009	3	
64	John Wakins (AUS)		63	G-4	15	5:08.316	18.792	4	
65	Tomoaki Kato (JPN)		69	G-5	15	5:08.393	18.662	5	
66	Carson Yeung (HKG)		65	G-6	15	5:11.726	18.942	6	
67	Scott Pettet (AUS)		70	G-7	15	5:14.585	19.191	7	
68	Yu Kikuchi (JPN)		68	G-8	15	5:17.649	18.825	8	
69	Yoshiki Masuda (JPN)		66	G-9	13	4:11.232	18.729	9	
70	Kevin Seysen (FRA)		62	G-10	0	0:00		10	
71	Mike Walker (USA)	PR Racing; PRS1 V3	H-1	15	5:05.165	18.661	1		
72	Jori Mykknen (FIN)		73	H-2	15	5:06.264	18.883	2	
73	Eiji Chiba (JPN)		72	H-3	15	5:06.543	18.863	3	
74	Arne-Peder Flesvik (NOR)		78	H-4	15	5:07.374	18.88	4	
75	Yoshiaki Amasaki (JPN)		76	H-5	15	5:09.606	18.781	5	
76	Hajime Ishihara (JPN)		75	H-6	15	5:13.146	18.676	6	
77	Yuichi Aoyagi (JPN)		77	H-7	15	5:15.173	19.319	7	
78	Derek Mccloskey (IRL)		74	H-8	14	5:03.131	19.199	8	
79	Yavuz Kura (GER)		80	H-9	14	5:06.186	19.302	9	
80	Kouki Kato (JPN)		79	H-10	1	0:29.207	29.207	10	
81	Frank Lemke (GER)		87	I-1	15	5:03.347	18.603	1	
82	Satsuki Yasmane (JPN)		82	I-2	15	5:04.606	18.852	2	
83	Juraj Hudy (SVK)		88	I-3	15	5:11.824	18.823	3	
84	Hidetoshi Matsuda (JPN)		83	I-4	15	5:16.567	19.409	4	
85	Da-De Sun (TWN)		90	I-5	15	5:17.489	19.156	5	
86	Yuzo Furudate (JPN)		85	I-6	14	5:01.517	19.478	6	
87	Mikko Helistl (FIN)		86	I-7	14	5:02.785	19.772	7	
88	Yusuke Kobayashi (JPN)		81	I-8	14	5:05.349	18.218	8	
89	Takahiro Ideura (JPN)		89	I-9	14	5:05.988	19.026	9	
90	Tadashi Hattori (JPN)		84	I-10	5	1:40.476	19.224	10	
91	Kiyotaka Ichikawa (JPN)		91	J-1	16	5:20.675	18.934	1	
92	Kazuo Yokokawa (JPN)		96	J-2	15	5:06.858	19.547	2	
93	Sven Rudig (AUT)		95	J-3	15	5:07.345	18.698	3	
94	Michael Bolger (IRL)		92	J-4	15	5:11.802	19.249	4	
95	Si Chang Su (KOR)		99	J-5	15	5:13.658	19.491	5	
96	Masahiro Otsuka (JPN)		100	J-6	15	5:16.609	19.76	6	
97	Yutaka Takizawa (JPN)		93	J-7	15	5:17.686	18.86	7	
98	Hidemine Ono (JPN)		94	J-8	15	5:18.274	19.322	8	
99	Tohru Iwata (JPN)		98	J-9	14	5:02.488	19.542	9	
100	Satoshi Okayama (JPN)		97	J-10	14	5:10.262	19.629	10	
101	Shin Chi Chou (TWN)		106	K-1	15	5:00.538	18.839	1	
102	Yui Kaino (JPN)		103	K-2	15	5:05.126	19.17	2	
103	Tzu-Chuen Wang (TWN)		108	K-3	15	5:10.101	19.726	3	
104	Kazutaka Sera (JPN)		102	K-4	15	5:13.014	19.224	4	
105	Yosuke Hosaka (JPN)		104	K-5	15	5:15.509	19.295	5	
106	Yu-Kai Zeng (TWN)		107	K-6	15	4:54.512	18.737	6	
107	Akihiko Takasaki (JPN)		105	K-7	14	5:00.419	19.388	7	
108	Jing Ming Chen (TWN)		110	K-8	14	5:00.541	19.559	8	
109	Rene Levetzow (AUT)		109	K-9	14	5:01.829	19.842	9	
110	Alexandre Beauquier (FRA)		101	K-10	14	5:10.614	19.253	10	
111	Shinya Kimura (JPN)		113	L-1	16	5:09.224	17.663	1	
112	Scott Yang (TWN)	SWORKz; S12-1M	111	L-2	15	5:08.811	19.208	2	
113	Daisuke Kato (JPN)		114	L-3	15	5:16.076	19.432	3	
114	Yutaka Furuyama (JPN)		118	L-4	15	5:16.355	18.971	4	
115	Ping Hung Hsu (TWN)		112	L-5	15	5:16.516	19.913	5	
116	Ashley Peeler (AUS)		110	L-6	15	5:20.731	18.878	6	
117	Motoyoshi Seki (JPN)		120	L-7	14	5:02.5	19.547	7	
118	Satoshi Fujii (JPN)		115	L-8	14	5:03.521	19.347	8	
119	Fumiyasu Toku (TWN)		117	L-9	14	5:10.27	19.616	9	
120	Arnaud Taibi (FRA)		116	L-10	13	5:20.554	19.767	10	
121	Tsuyoshi Ito (JPN)		122	M-1	15	5:11.994	19.643	1	
122	Kenji Fukaya (JPN)		123	M-2	15	5:17.895	19.584	2	
123	Ren Jie Chen (TWN)		125	M-3	14	5:03.813	19.85	3	
124	Andrew Molkentin (AUS)		129	M-4	14	5:05.367	19.726	4	
125	Mark Lim (SGP)		127	M-5	14	5:06.381	19.767	5	
126	Toshiaki Fujimori (JPN)		130	M-6	14	5:06.996	19.63	6	
127	Naoki Umezawa (JPN)		126	M-7	14	5:11.002	19.786	7	
128	Susumu Tamura (JPN)		124	M-8	14	5:16.251	19.247	8	
129	Keiiti Fujita (JPN)		121	M-9	14	5:19.171	19.939	9	
130	David Church (GBR)		128	M-10	13	5:01.141	20.098	10	
131	Lee Back Hee (KOR)		131	N-1	15	5:12.39	19.767	1	
132	Kai Koivuranta (SWE)		132	N-2	14	5:03.54	19.764	2	
133	Masanori Komada (JPN)		134	N-3	14	5:05.386	19.991	3	
134	Chien-Fa Lin (TWN)		135	N-4	14	5:06.827	20.228	4	
135	Mami Hoshino (JPN)		136	N-5	14	5:10.376	21.037	5	
136	Jung-Nan Yen (TWN)		133	N-6	14	5:16.906	20.158	6	
137	WK Foong (MYS)		138	N-7	14	5:17.718	21.038	7	
138	Seiichi Takahashi (JPN)		137	N-8	14	5:18.36	20.447	8	
139	Koichiro Teramoto (JPN)		139	N-9	13	5:01.049	20.931	9	
140	Naomi Tomita (JPN)		140	N-10	13	5:02.876	21.075	10	
141	Thierry Rosado (MON)		141	N-11	13	5:13.412	21.455	11	
142	Masatsugu Ido (JPN)	Yokomo; YZ-2	142	N-12	6	2:12.592	19.119	12	
