= 1993 IFMAR 1:10 Electric Off-Road World Championships =

Event Information
- Event Title: 1993 IFMAR 1:10 Electric Off-Road World Championships
- Dates run: 27th July - 8th Aug 1993

Club Information
- Location: Basildon, Essex
- Host country: Great Britain
- Surface: Dirt

Vehicle Specification
- Class: 1:10 Electric Offroad Buggy

2wd Title
- First: Brian Kinwald (USA); Team Associated
- Second: Joel Johnson (USA); Team Losi
- Third: Craig Drescher (GBR); Team Associated

4WD Title
- First: Masami Hirosaka (JPN); Yokomo
- Second: Kevin Moore (GBR); Schumacher
- Third: William Mitcham (GBR); Schumacher

The fifth IFMAR - 1:10 Electric Off-Road World Championship was held in Basildon in Essex. The 2wd class had a popular win being won by Brian Kinwald from America racing an Associated RC10. Gene Husting of Associated described how the track was deteriorating every day and how team order were implemented for the 3rd final race "Brian's the only one who has a chance to win. He's starting in 6th position. He needs to win this round. If he comes up on you, give him plenty of room to pass. You are, of course, free to race everyone else on the track.". The 4WD was won by Masami Hirosaka of JPN racing a Yokomo there were strong showing for the two home British driver racing Schumacher Cat cars the brand with which Masami won his first title in 1987.

== Results ==
=== 2WD ===
==== Race ====
Pos.	Driver	Car	Motor	Qual.	A1					A2					A3					Total		
Pos.	Driver	Car	Motor	Qual.	Pos.	Laps	Time	FL	Pt.	Pos.	Laps	Time	FL	Pt.	Pos.	Laps	Time	FL	Pt.	Total	Lap	Time
1	(United States) Brian Kinwald	Associated RC10	Reedy	8	2	12	5:20.23		9	1	12	5:05.895		10	1	11	5:10.81		10	20	24	10:26.125
2	(United States) Joel Johnson	Losi XX	Trinity	1	1	12	5:18.4		10	2	11	5:10.5		9	4	11	5:18.58		7	19	23	10:28.9
3	(United Kingdom) Craig Drescher	Associated RC10	Reedy	6	5	12	5:25.46		6	5	11	5:15.05		6	2	11	5:11.63		9	15	23	10:37.09
4	(Japan) Masami Hirosaka	Associated RC10	Reedy	7	4	12	5:25.07		7	7	11	5:19.38		4	3	11	5:12.55		8	15	23	10:37.62
5	(United States) Matt Francis	Associated RC10	Reedy	4	6	11	5:00.49		5	3	11	5:11.17		8	5	11	5:19.83		6	14	22	10:11.66
6	(United States) Scott Brown	Losi XX		2	3	12	5:23.96		8	6	11	5:19.03		5	6	11	5:23.84		5	13	23	10:42.99
7	(United States) Mark Pavidis	Associated RC10	Reedy	3	8	11	5:11.9		3	4	11	5:14.86		7	8	11	5:33.67		3	10	22	10:26.76
8	(United States) Matt Ledger	Associated RC10	Reedy	10	9	11	5:14.35		2	8	10	5:01.41		3	7	11	5:26.85		4	7	22	10:41.2
9	(United States) John Koonce	Losi XX		9	7	11	5:11.07		4	9	10	5:08.15		2	9	10	5:13.1		2	6	21	10:19.22
10	(United States) Carlos Gonzales	Associated RC10		5	10	11	5:17.13		1	10	5	3:32.62		1	10	4	2:07.35		1	2	16	8:49.75

=== 4WD ===
==== Race ====
Pos.	Driver	Car	Motor	Qual.	A1					A2					A3					Total		
Pos.	Driver	Car	Motor	Qual.	Pos.	Laps	Time	FL	Pt.	Pos.	Laps	Time	FL	Pt.	Pos.	Laps	Time	FL	Pt.	Pt.	Lap	Time
1	(Japan) Masami Hirosaka	Yokomo YZ-10 World Spec	Reedy	TQ	1	13	5:15.38		10	1	13	5:18.22		10	2	13	5:22.58		9	20		10:33.6
2	(United Kingdom) Kevin Moore	Schumacher CAT 2000	LRP	4	4	12	5:08.35		7	2	12	5:00.05		9	1	13	5:21.32		10	19		10:21.37
3	(United Kingdom) William Mitcham	Schumacher CAT 2000	Corally	6	6	12	5:11.4		5	3	12	5:06.35		8	4	12	5:02.51		7	15		10:08.86
4	(Japan) Shin Adachi	Yokomo YZ-10 World Spec	Reedy	2	2	13	5:23.59		9	8	12	5:16.52		3	5	12	5:05.41		6	15		10:21.93
5	(United States) JD Beckwith	Yokomo YZ-10 World Spec	Reedy	5	5	12	5:10.77		6	5	12	5:10.18		6	3	12	5:02.41		8	14		10:12.59
6	(United States) Mark Pavidis	Yokomo YZ-10 World Spec	Reedy	5	5	12	5:11.56		6	4	12	5:09.91		7	6	12	5:13.57		5	13		10:21.47
7	(United States) Rick Hohwart	Yokomo YZ-10 World Spec	Peak	3	3	12	5:05.02		8	9	12	5:19.16		2	9	2	0:56.44		2	10		10:24.18
8	(United States) Joel Johnson	Kyosho Lazer ZX-R	Trinity	8	8	12	5:13.72		3	6	12	5:11.27		5	8	12	5:15.63		3	8		10:24.99
9	(United States) Derek Furutani	Yokomo YZ-10 World Spec	LRP	9	9	11	5:00.03		2	7	12	5:13.37		4	7	12	5:13.76		4	8		10:27.13
DSQ	(United Kingdom) Ben Sturnham	Schumacher CAT 2000	Tanaplan	2	~~4~~	0	-.---	-.---	0	~~2~~	0	-.---	-.---	0	~~3~~	0	-.---	-.---	0	0	0	-.---
