= Masami Hirosaka =

Japanese radio controlled car driver (born 1970)

Masami Hirosaka (広坂正美, Hirosaka Masami; born February 26, 1970, Kyoto, Japan) is a Japanese radio controlled car driver who is considered to be the world's most successful with a record fourteen IFMAR World Championships in 1/12 scale electric, 1/10 scale Pan, 1/10 scale 2WD off-road and 1/10 scale 4WD, all electric. Hirosaka's peers have nicknamed him "Master Masami". He was considered to be one of the highest paid drivers in RC racing, until he retired from the activity. His last IFMAR race was the 2008 world championship in Thailand. His retirement ceremony was on May 3, 2009.

== Early years ==
Masami was first brought into RC car racing at the age of seven by his father Masaaki; a former motorcycle racer, who finished 2nd at the 1971 Suzuka 6 Hours, a research and development employee of ABC Hobby and later with Yokomo and radio controlled car racer and designer, when he brought him a Tamiya Lamborghini Countach. They raced together for four years until upon realizing Masami was the better driver, Masaaki retired from racing to focus on becoming his mechanic.

In 1987, during a world championship round for the 4WD off-road at Romsey, England, Hirosaka arrived as a privateer with a Schumacher CAT, bar being provided power sources from HPI Japan. He had shown promise during practice and was brought into attention by Phil Booth, Schumacher's works driver who referred him to Cecil Schumacher, who provided him a longer wheelbase version called the CAT XL, then unavailable in Japan and was raced by a majority of racers. Despite being near-stock with much of the running gear added on from his old CAT, Hirosaka managed to win the title. After the win, he was given numerous offers from sponsors before he ultimately settled with Yokomo.

== Later activities ==
As well as driving for Yokomo and Associated Electrics where he helps develop and design new cars and tests the resulting prototypes, Hirosaka held a job as a sales engineer for Yokomo. Of all his IFMAR championship wins, only his first title was won driving cars from neither of these manufacturers. He was driving a Schumacher CAT XL.

For once or twice a week, he practices for 100 runs, a majority of these is done on-road to improve his reflexes.

In a 1998 interview with Germany's KEIL DTM magazine, Hirosaka listed his other hobbies as computers and theater. His father who is now semi-retired, runs an RC car preparation service whilst doing contract work for Kyosho. In a 1999 interview with RCCA, he said that he has appeared several times on Japanese TV. He also says that he has several non-RC sponsors, such as Pioneer.

In his later career, he mentored teammate and compatriot Naoto Matsukura and was the lead organizer of the 2015 IFMAR 1:10 Electric Off-Road World Championship.

== Equipment ==
Throughout his career, Masami preferred to race with stick transmitters, largely as when he began racing, Japanese branded wheel transmitters did not exist; he once experimented with wheels but felt sticks gave better car control. Up until 1987, he used Futaba transmitter; after that he switched to KO Propo which he used through his career. Under his arrangement with Yokomo, his car ran on Reedy motors, a subsidiary of Associated Electrics.

Throughout his career, Masami has always raced in the green over white with pink flames (similar style to those found typically in hot rods), but since the 1990s, the pink colour has become less dominant part of the colour as he added the orange and red to form part of his current colour scheme.

== Achievements ==
Masami is R/C racing's equivalent of baseball's Lou Gehrig or basketball's Michael Jordan—a born natural.

— Radio Control Car Action's Steve Pond on Masami.

Throughout his competition career, Hirosaka has a total of 307 victories out of a total of 447 races, with 47 second-place finishes and 27 third.

He has a total of 37 World Championship starts with 25 podium appearances including 14 championship titles and 35 A-main appearances.

Out of a total of 70 JMRCA All-Japan Championship appearances, he won 52 of those spanning 21 consecutive years (1986–2006), 67 of those are A-main appearances.

In 1998, he is one of two drivers to achieve an electric car clean sweep at the JMRCA All-Japan Championship, the only driver to achieve this more than once (also 1987, 1989 and 1992) and the only one to achieve five out of five wins in eligible classes, a feat no longer possible since 2005 when the 1:10 Racing class was discontinued.

An article by Radio Control Car Action list him on the top spot as the five greatest driver of all time in 2010 In the 2015 edition of the Top 10 best of all time, he was beaten to the spot by Ryan Cavalieri.

Listed in RCCA in its May issues as one of the 10 Best Drivers between 1989 up to 1992. When the readers ranking was introduced, he was ranked 5th in 1996, 2nd in 1998 and 3rd in 1999. Hirosaka is the only few non-US drivers to be honored and the only foreigner to regularly appear in the list.

== Complete results ==
=== IFMAR Worlds ===
Year	Result	Class	Venue	Car	Motor	Source
1986	16	1:12 EP Track	Las Vegas	ABC KSC ALF 11	M&Y 480 RS	
1987	8	1:10 EP Off-Road 2WD	Romsey	Associated RC10	HPI UNO	report
1987	1	1:10 EP Off-Road 4WD	Romsey	Schumacher CAT XL	HPI UNO	report
1988	1	1:12 EP Track	Baarn	Associated RC12L	Reedy	
1989	1	1:10 EP Off-road 2WD	St Ives	Associated RC10	Reedy	
1989	1	1:10 EP Off-road 4WD	St Ives	Yokomo YZ-870C	Reedy	
1990	2	1:12 EP Track	Singapore	Associated RC12L	Reedy	
1991	1	1:10 EP Off-road 2WD	Michigan	Associated RC10L	Reedy	
1991	2	1:10 EP Off-road 4WD	Michigan	Yokomo YZ-10 Works '93	Reedy	
1992	3	1:12 EP Track	Michigan	Associated RC12LW	Reedy	
1993	4	1:10 EP Off-road 2WD	Basildon	Associated RC10L	Reedy	report
1993	1	1:10 EP Off-road 4WD	Basildon	Yokomo YZ-10 Works '93	Reedy	report
1994	1	1:10 PRO 10		Yokomo	Reedy	
1994	3	1:12 EP Track	Paris	Associated RC12LS	Reedy	
1995	2	1:10 EP Off-road 2WD		Associated RC10L	Reedy	
1995	3	1:10 EP Off-road 4WD		Yokomo	Reedy	
1996	1	1:12 EP Track	California	Associated RC12LC	Reedy	
1996		1:10 PRO 10	California		Reedy	
1997	3	1:10 EP Off-road 2WD	Pomona	Associated RC10L	Reedy	report
1997	1	1:10 EP Off-road 4WD	Pomona	Yokomo	Reedy	report
1998	2	1:12 EP Track	Newcastle	Associated RC12L3	Reedy	
1998	4	1:10 PRO 10	Newcastle		Reedy	
1999	1	1:10 EP Off-road 2WD	Rauma	Associated RC10L	Reedy	report
1999	14	1:10 EP Off-road 4WD	Rauma	Yokomo	Reedy	report
2000	1	1:12 EP Track	Tsukuba	Associated RC12L3	Reedy	
2000	1	1:10 PRO 10	Tsukuba	Yokomo	Reedy	
2000	3	1:10 ISTC	Tsukuba	Yokomo	Reedy	
2001		1:10 EP Off-road 2WD		Associated RC10	Reedy	
2001		1:10 EP Off-road 4WD		Yokomo	Reedy	
2002	1	1:12 EP Track	Krugersdorp	Yokomo 12LY	Reedy	
2002	4	1:10 ISTC	Krugersdorp	Yokomo 12LY	Reedy	
2004	1	1:12 EP Track	Florida	Associated RC12L4	Reedy	
2005	6	1:10 EP Off-road 2WD		Associated RC10B4	Reedy	report
2005	5	1:10 EP Off-road 4WD		Yokomo BX	Reedy	report
2006	2	1:10 ISTC		Yokomo	orion	
2007	4	1:10 EP Off-road 2WD		Associated RC10B4	Reedy	report
2007	4	1:10 EP Off-road 4WD		Yokomo BX	Reedy	report
2008	3	1:10 ISTC		Yokomo	Nosram	

=== JMRCA All-Japan Championship results ===
Year	Result	Class	Venue	Car	Motor	Source
1982	14	1:12 EP Racing	Chukyo Racecourse	ABC		
1983	3	1:12 EP Racing	Chukyo Racecourse	ABC		
1984	17	1:12 EP Racing	Shinjuku NS Building	ABC		
1985	2	1:12 EP Racing	Nagoya Racecourse	ABC ALF-10		
1986	1	1:12 EP Racing	Komazawa Olympic Park	ABC KSC ALF 11	M&Y 480 RS	
1986	2	1:10 EP Off-Road 2WD	Mobara Futaba Course	Associated RC10		
1986	20	1:10 EP Off-Road 4WD	Mobara Futaba Course	Yokomo YZ-834B		
1987	1	1:12 EP Racing	Kawasaki Racecourse	Associated RC12	HPI UNO	
1987	2 (Note: Won by invited driver Gil Losi, Jr. but awarded to Hirosaka per rules.)	1:10 EP Off-Road 2WD	Yokohama	Associated RC10	HPI UNO	
1987	1	1:10 EP Off-Road 4WD	Yokohama	Schumacher CAT XL	HPI UNO	
1988	1	1:10 EP Off-Road 2WD		Associated RC10		
1988	1	1:10 EP Off-Road 4WD		Yokomo YZ-870C		
1989	1	1:12 EP Racing		Associated RC12		
1989	1	1:10 EP Off-Road 2WD	Yomiuriland	Associated RC10GX		
1989	1	1:10 EP Off-Road 4WD	Yomiuriland	Yokomo YZ-870C		
1990	1	1:12 EP Racing	Yokota Hobby	Associated RC12		
1990	1	1:10 EP Off-Road 2WD	Yomiuriland	Associated RC10		
1990	2	1:10 EP Off-Road 4WD	Yomiuriland	Yokomo YZ-870C		
1991		1:12 EP Racing	Yokota Hobby	Associated RC12		
1991	1	1:10 EP Off-Road 2WD	Yatabe Arena	Associated RC10BX		
1991	1	1:10 EP Off-Road 4WD	Yatabe Arena	Yokomo YZ-10 Works '91		
1992	1	1:12 EP Racing	Yokota Hobby	Associated RC12		
1992	1	1:10 EP Off-Road 2WD	Woody Dome	Associated RC10		
1992	1	1:10 EP Off-Road 4WD	Woody Dome	Yokomo		
1993		1:12 EP Racing		Associated RC12		
1993	1	1:10 EP Off-Road 2WD	Yatabe Arena	Associated RC10FX.S		
1993	1	1:10 EP Off-Road 4WD	Yatabe Arena	Yokomo YZ-10 Works '93		
1994	1	1:12 EP Racing	Bellser Kit	Associated RC12LS		
1994	2	1:10 EP Off-Road 2WD		Associated RC10		
1994	1	1:10 EP Off-Road 4WD	Yatabe Arena	Yokomo		
1994	1	1:10 EP Racing		Yokomo YRX-10		
1995	1	1:12 EP Racing	Bellser Kit	Associated RC12LS		
1995	1	1:10 EP Off-Road 2WD	Yatabe Arena	Associated RC10B2	Reedy	
1995	1	1:10 EP Off-Road 4WD	Yatabe Arena	Yokomo		
1996	1	1:12 EP Racing	Bellser Kit			
1996	1	1:10 EP Off-Road 2WD	Woody Dome	Associated RC10		
1996	1	1:10 EP Off-Road 4WD	Woody Dome	Yokomo		
1996	1	1:10 EP Racing	Yatabe Arena	Yokomo		
1996	5	1:10 EP Touring Expert	Yatabe Arena	Yokomo		
1997	1	1:12 EP Racing				
1997	2	1:10 EP Off-Road 2WD	Woody Dome	Associated RC10		
1997	1	1:10 EP Off-Road 4WD	Woody Dome	Yokomo		
1997	1	1:10 EP Racing		Yokomo		
1997	1	1:10 EP Touring Expert		Yokomo		
1998	1	1:12 EP Racing	Yatabe Arena			
1998	1	1:10 EP Off-Road 2WD	Yatabe Arena	Associated RC10		
1998	1	1:10 EP Off-Road 4WD	Yatabe Arena	Yokomo		
1998	1	1:10 EP Racing	Kei Tune RS	Yokomo		
1998	1	1:10 EP Touring Expert	Kawaba RC Plaza	Yokomo		
1999	1	1:12 EP Racing	Kawaba RC Plaza			
1999	1	1:10 EP Off-Road 2WD	Yatabe Arena	Associated RC10		
1999	1	1:10 EP Off-Road 4WD	Yatabe Arena	Yokomo		
1999	1	1:10 EP Racing	Kei Tune RS	Yokomo		
1999	2	1:10 EP Touring Expert	Yatabe Arena	Yokomo		
2000	1	1:10 EP Touring Expert	Yatabe Arena	Yokomo		
2001	1	1:10 EP Off-Road 2WD	Yatabe Arena	Associated RC10		
2001	1	1:10 EP Off-Road 4WD	Yatabe Arena	Yokomo		
2001	1	1:10 EP Racing	Kei Tune RS	Yokomo		
2001	1	1:10 EP Touring Expert	Yatabe Arena	Yokomo		
2002	2	1:10 EP Off-Road 2WD	Yatabe Arena	Associated RC10		
2002	1	1:10 EP Racing	Yatabe Arena	Yokomo		
2002	1	1:10 EP Touring Expert	Ichirino RC Plaza	Yokomo		
2003	1	1:10 EP Touring Expert	Ichirino RC Plaza	Yokomo		
2004	1	1:12 EP Racing	Yatabe Arena			
2004	1	1:10 EP Touring Expert	Kawaba RC Plaza	Yokomo		
2005	1	1:12 EP Racing	Yatabe Arena	Yokomo		
2005	5	1:10 EP Touring Expert	Kawaba RC Plaza	Yokomo		
2006	1	1:10 EP Touring Expert	Yatabe Arena	Yokomo		
2006	8	1:10 EP Off-Road 4WD	Yatabe Arena	Yokomo		
2007	2	1:12 EP Racing	Yatabe Arena	Associated	Nosram	
2007	3	1:10 EP Touring Super Expert	Yatabe Arena	Yokomo	Nosram	
2008	1	1:12 EP Racing	Yatabe Arena	Associated	Nosram	
