= Naoto Matsukura =

Japanese radio-controlled car racer

Naoto Matsukura (松倉直人, Matsukura Naoto; born 1993) is a Japanese radio-controlled car racer from Edogawa, Tokyo. He has won seven IFMAR World Championship titles (4x 1:12, 2x 200mm nitro, 1x 1:10 touring) as well as five top qualifier titles. He has also won 24 JMRCA All-Japan Championship titles. Until the end of 2014, Matsukura drove for Yokomo. At the beginning of 2015 he signed up to drive for Tamiya and Kyosho.. Currently he races for Infinity which he used to win the 200mm touring in 2018 and 2026.

== Biography ==
Matsukura won his first national championship race at the age of 12 in 2004. At 15, was the youngest driver to win the IFMAR Worlds in 2008. In total, he has won 25 JMRCA All-Japan Championship titles including:

- 1 1:10 EP Touring Sportsman (opened to amateur/unsponsored racers with stock motors)
- 4 1:10 EP Touring Super Expert (for elite racers with modified motors)
- 7 1:12 EP Racing
- 5 1:10 EP Off-road 2WD
- 9 1:10 EP Off-road 4WD
- 1 1:8 GP Off-Road

During his tenure at Yokomo, he was mentored by Masami Hirosaka. At the end of 2014, left Yokomo after ten years with them and signed a contract with Muchmore Racing for use of its electronics, Kyosho for off-road racing and Tamiya for touring car racing.

His elder sister Tomomi Matsukura (松倉友美) also compete in radio-controlled car racing.

== Complete R/C Racing summary ==
Bold on results indicates top qualifier

=== IFMAR World Championship results ===
Year	Result	Class	Venue	Car	Motor
2007	9	1:10 Off-Road 4WD	(Japan) Hakusan Arena	Yokomo MR4-BX "Phase II"	Nosram
2008	1	1:12 EP Track	(Thailand) Radio Control Speedway	Associated RC12R5	Nosram Pure Evolution
2008	15	1:10 ISTC	(Thailand) Radio Control Speedway	Yokomo MR4TC BD	Nosram
2010	1	1:12 EP Track	(Germany) Gymnasium Burgdorf	Yokomo R12	Nosram Pure Evolution
2010	21	1:10 ISTC	(Germany) MAC Burgdorf	Yokomo MR4TC BD5 World Spec	Nosram
2011	8	1:10 Off-Road 2WD	(Finland) Pitkämäki Race-Centre	Associated RC10B4.1	Nosram
2011	8	1:10 Off-Road 4WD	(Finland) Pitkämäki Race-Centre	Yokomo B-Max 4 II	Nosram
2012	1	1:12 EP Track	(Netherlands) Kennemer Sportcenter	Yokomo R12C	Yokomo ZERO R
2012	4	1:10 ISTC	(Netherlands) MACH Circuit	Yokomo MR4TC BD7	Yokomo
2013	10	1:10 Off-Road 2WD	(United States) Silver Dollar R/C Raceway	Yokomo B-Max 2 MR	Yokomo R-Series
2013	2	1:10 Off-Road 4WD	(United States) Silver Dollar R/C Raceway	Yokomo B-Max 4 III	Yokomo
2014	2	1:12 EP Track	(United States) Minnreg Hall	Yokomo R12 C3.1	Yokomo
2014	1	1:10 ISTC	(United States) Full Throttle Raceway	Yokomo BD7 2015	Yokomo RP
2015	20	1:10 Off-Road 2WD	(Japan) Yatabe Arena	Kyosho Ultima RB6 WC	Muchmore Fleta ZX
2015	2	1:10 Off-Road 4WD	(Japan) Yatabe Arena	Kyosho Lazer ZX-6	Muchmore Fleta ZX
2016	1	1:12 EP Track	(China) Beijing Science and Technology Gymnasium	Roche Rapide P12 2017	Muchmore Fleta ZX
2016	22	1:10 ISTC	(China) Beijing Fengtai Model Auto Training Center	Tamiya TRF419X	Muchmore Fleta ZX
2016	51	1:8 IC Off-Road	(United States) RC Tracks of Las Vegas	Kyosho Inferno MP9 TKI4	OS Speed
2026	1	1:10 IC On-Road	(Italy) Gubbio Miniautodromo M. Rosati	Infinity IF15-2	Ielasi Tuned

=== FEMCA Championship results ===
Year	Result	Class	Venue	Car	Motor
2012	2	1:10 EP Off-Road 2WD		Yokomo	Yokomo
2012	1	1:10 EP Off-Road 4WD		Yokomo	Yokomo
2012	5	1:10 EP Off-Road Short Course		Yokomo	Yokomo
2013	1	1:10 EP Off-Road 2WD		Yokomo	Yokomo
2013	1	1:10 EP Off-Road 4WD		Yokomo	Yokomo

=== JMRCA All-Japan Championship results ===
A non-first-place finisher highlighted in gold indicates that despite being won by an invited foreign driver, the championship is awarded to the best native driver.

Year	Result	Class	Venue	Car	Motor
2003	28	1:10 EP Touring Sportsman	Yatabe Arena		
2004	1	1:10 EP Touring Sportsman	Yatabe Arena	Yokomo MR-4TC SD SSG	
2005	34	1:10 EP Touring Open		Yokomo	
2006	3	1:10 EP Touring Open	Yatabe Arena	Yokomo	
2006	63	1:10 EP Off-Road 2WD	Ichirino RC Plaza	Associated RC10	
2006	11	1:10 EP Off-Road 4WD	Ichirino RC Plaza	Yokomo	
2007	1	1:12 EP Racing	Yatabe Arena	Associated	Nosram
2007	24	1:10 EP Touring Super Expert	Yatabe Arena	Yokomo	Nosram
2007	5	1:10 EP Off-Road 2WD	Yatabe Arena	Associated RC10	Nosram
2007	1	1:10 EP Off-Road 4WD	Yatabe Arena	Yokomo	Nosram
2008	1	1:12 EP Racing	Ichirino RC Plaza	Associated	Nosram
2008	7	1:10 EP Touring Super Expert	Yatabe Arena	Yokomo	Nosram
2008	1	1:10 EP Off-Road 2WD	Yatabe Arena	Associated RC10	Nosram
2008	1	1:10 EP Off-Road 4WD	Yatabe Arena	Yokomo	Nosram
2009	1	1:12 EP Racing	Yatabe Arena	Yokomo	Nosram
2009	5	1:10 EP Touring Super Expert	Kawaba RC Plaza	Yokomo	Nosram
2009	2	1:10 EP Off-Road 2WD	Yatabe Arena	Yokomo	Nosram
2009	1	1:10 EP Off-Road 4WD	Yatabe Arena	Yokomo	Nosram
2010	1	1:12 EP Racing	Kawaba RC Plaza	Yokomo	Nosram
2010	7	1:10 EP Touring Super Expert		Yokomo	Nosram
2010	1	1:10 EP Off-Road 2WD	Yatabe Arena	Yokomo	Nosram
2010	1	1:10 EP Off-Road 4WD	Yatabe Arena	Yokomo	Nosram
2011	1	1:12 EP Racing	Yatabe Arena	Yokomo	Nosram
2011	2 (Note: Won by invited driver Ronald Völker.)	1:10 EP Touring Super Expert	Platopia	Yokomo	Nosram
2011	1	1:10 EP Off-Road 2WD	Yatabe Arena	Yokomo	Nosram
2011	1	1:10 EP Off-Road 4WD	Yatabe Arena	Yokomo	Nosram
2012	1	1:12 EP Racing	Yatabe Arena	Yokomo	Yokomo
2012	1	1:10 EP Touring Super Expert	Platopia	Yokomo	Yokomo
2012	1	1:10 EP Off-Road 2WD	Yatabe Arena	Yokomo B-Max 2	Yokomo
2013	1	1:12 EP Racing	Yatabe Arena	Yokomo	Yokomo
2013	1	1:10 EP Touring Super Expert	Platopia	Yokomo	Yokomo
2013	2	1:10 EP Off-Road 2WD	Yatabe Arena	Yokomo B-Max 2 MR	Yokomo R-Series
2013	1	1:10 EP Off-Road 4WD	Yatabe Arena	Yokomo	Yokomo
2014	3	1:12 EP Racing		Yokomo	Yokomo
2014	1	1:10 EP Touring Super Expert	BrrTops	Yokomo	Yokomo
2014	1	1:10 EP Off-Road 2WD	Yatabe Arena	Yokomo	Yokomo
2014	1	1:10 EP Off-Road 4WD	Yatabe Arena	Yokomo	Yokomo
2015	2	1:10 EP Touring Super Expert	BrrTops	Tamiya TRF419	Muchmore
2015	6	1:10 EP Off-Road 2WD	Yatabe Arena	Kyosho Ultima RB6	Muchmore
2015	1	1:10 EP Off-Road 4WD	Yatabe Arena	Kyosho Lazer ZX-6	Muchmore
2015	2	1:8 GP Off-Road	Futaba Buggy Track	Kyosho Inferno MP9 TKI3	OS Speed B2101 MM Spec
2016	1	1:8 GP Off-Road	Futaba Buggy Track	Kyosho Inferno MP9 TKI4	OS Speed
2016	2	1:10 EP Off-Road 2WD	Yatabe Arena	Kyosho Ultima RB6.6	Muchmore
2016	1	1:10 EP Off-Road 4WD	Yatabe Arena	Kyosho Lazer ZX-6.6	Muchmore
