= Nic Case =

Radio-controlled vehicle driver

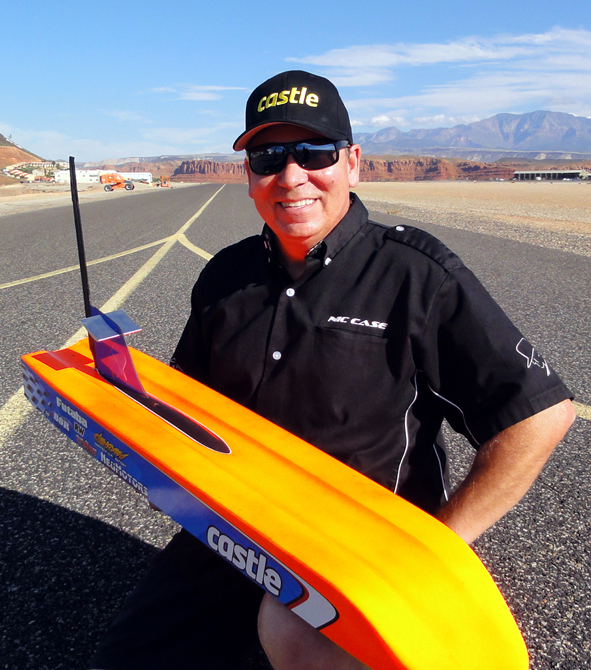
Nic Case with the R/C Bullet

Nic Case (born 1963) is an American radio-controlled model hobbyist from Southern California specializing in speedrunning. He is notable for becoming the first person to reach 200 mph (321.9 km/h) with his radio-controlled car, the R/C Bullet, having surpassed his records three times with a confirmed entry at the Guinness World Records in 2008, 2013 and 2014. His attempt has been documented by the Discovery Channel and was cited in an episode of Tosh.0.

== Biography ==
A clay modeller for Ford Motor Company in Irvine, California, Nic Case took up radio-controlled cars in 1990 following a motorcycle accident.

At the inaugural "World's Fastest RC Car Challenge" event organized by Radio Control Car Action, he posted a speed of 134.4 mph (216.3 km/h), surpassing the world record held by Team Associated's Cliff Lett in 2001. He later used a Schumacher Mi3 as a base, the car powered by a 11-horsepower (8.2-kilowatt) R/C aircraft motor and a 12-cell battery pack. The car also had a four-wheel drive system of his own design for improved traction and his own tires, which were vulcanized to the aluminum rims, to improve airflow underneath the vehicle. To prevent the car from flipping over, he added a gyroscope steering-correction system from radio-controlled helicopters. The car took six months to build, at a cost of $4,000. This paid off at the ISC Speed Run event in Rockingham Dragway, Rockingham, North Carolina, on October 4, 2008, where the car reached a speed of 161.76 mph (260.3 km/h)

Case made another attempt in 2011 when he collaborated with Associated Electrics, which built him a Team Associated SR11. The SR11 was based on the Nitro TC3, a 1:10 scale Nitro Touring Car, but was powered by an electric motor producing 10 horsepower fed by twelve lithium polymer batteries and weighing 10 lb (4.5 kg), with a vertical tailfin mounted to the body for stability. His attempt at the Auto Club Speedway was documented by the Discovery Channel.

Case made another attempt on December 19, 2012, when he took the record further at 171.96 mph (276.7 km/h). Unable to bring this any further, and leaving his new record unconfirmed, he briefly retired when his 17-year-old nephew was killed in a hit and run accident. This led Case to reconsider his retirement and submit his recent record to Guinness.

In early 2014, he brought his record to 188 mph (302.6 km/h) and in August he made another pass at 196 mph (315.4 km/h). At an event organized by the Radio Operated Scale Speed Association (ROSSA), he finally reached 202 mph (325.1 km/h) at St. George, Utah.
