= 1985 IFMAR 1:10 Electric Off-Road World Championships =

Competition for radio-controlled model cars

Event Information
- Event Title: IFMAR 1:10 Electric Off-Road World Championships
- Dates run: 6–11 July 1985

Club Information
- Venue: The Ranch Pit Stop
- Location: Del Mar, California,
- Host country: USA

Vehicle Specification
- Class: 1:10 Electric Offorad Buggy

Stock
- First: Jay Halsey (USA); Team Associated

Modified
- First: Gil Losi Jr. (USA); Yokomo

The 1985 IFMAR 1:10 Electric Off-Road World Championship was the first edition of the IFMAR 1:10 Electric Off-Road World Championship. This global event was for 1 to 10th scale electric powered radio control cars. It was held in Del Mar, California.

== Results ==
=== Stock Class ===
				Qual.	A1				A2				A3				Total		
Pos.	Driver	Car	Motor	Qual.	Pos	Laps	Time	Av Lap.	Pos	Laps	Time	Av Lap.	Pos	Laps	Time	Av Lap.	Laps	Time	Av Lap.
1	(United States) Jay Halsey	Associated RC10	Reedy	6	1	20	5:14.5	15.73	1	20	5:08.1	15.41	1	20	5:06.2	15.31	40	10:14.3	15.36
2	(United States) Gil Losi Jr.	Associated RC10	Reedy	1	8	18	5:02.5	16.81	2	20	5:12.4	15.62	2	20	5:12.5	15.63	40	10:24.9	15.62
3	(United States) Tony Neisinger	Associated RC10	Reedy	2	4	19	5:07.3	16.17	3	20	5:15.2	15.76	3	19	5:02.4	15.92	39	10:17.6	15.84
4	(United States) Mike Giem	Cox Scorpion	Reedy	7	2	19	5:00.9	15.84	4	19	5:03.4	15.97	4	19	5:04.1	16.01	38	10:07.5	15.99
5	(United States) Eustace Moore	Associated RC10	Reedy	9	6	19	5:15.6	16.61	5	19	5:10.3	16.33	5	19	5:05.1	16.06	38	10:15.4	16.19
6	(United States) Kris Moore	Associated RC10	Reedy	3	3	19	5:04.1	16.01	8	18	5:10.9	17.27	6	19	5:13.3	16.49	38	10:17.4	16.25
7	(United States) Gary Kyes	Associated RC10	Reedy	4	5	19	5:09.8	16.31	10	6	:00	0	8	18	5:03.6	16.87	37	10:13.4	16.58
8	(Canada) Paul Dionne	Cox Scorpion	Reedy	8	7	18	5:00.4	16.69	6	18	5:01.9	16.77	7	19	5:13.6	16.51	37	10:14	16.59
9	(United States) Jerry Case	Associated RC10	Reedy	10	9	17	5:08.4	18.14	7	18	5:09.4	17.19	9	18	5:08.3	17.13	36	10:17.7	17.16
10	(United States) Mike Dunn	Associated RC10	Reedy	5	10	5	-.---	-	9	17	5:05.1	17.95	10	15	-.---	-	32		

=== Modified Class ===
				Qual.	A1				A2				A3				Total		
Pos.	Driver	Car	Motor	Qual.	Pos	Laps	Time	Av	Pos	Laps	Time	Av	Pos	Laps	Time	Av	Laps	Time	Av
1	(United States) Gil Losi Jr.	Yokomo YZ-834B	Trinity	1	1	21	5:03.1	14.43	5	20	5:00.9	15.05	1	21	5:08.2	14.68	42	10:11.3	14.55
2	(United States) Jay Halsey	Associated RC10 4WD	Reedy	2	4	20	5:01.4	15.07	1	21	5:06.3	14.59	2	20	5:10.8	14.80	42	10:17.1	14.69
3	(Canada) Paul Dionne	Yokomo YZ-834B	Trinity	7	9	20	5:03.4	15.17	2	21	5:13.6	14.93	6	21	5:11.8	14.85	42	10:25.4	14.89
4	(United States) Chris Allec	Hirobo 44B	Trinity	5	10	11	-.---	-	3	21	5:14.6	14.98	3	21	5:13.9	14.95	42	10:28.5	14.96
5	(United States) Mike Giem	Yokomo YZ-834B	Trinity	6	2	21	5:07.2	14.63	8	20	5:07.1	15.36	4	20	5:01.9	15.10	41	10:09.1	14.86
6	(United States) Eric Soderquist	Yokomo YZ-834B	Reedy	3	6	20	5:04.7	15.24	4	21	5:14.9	15.00	8	19	5:02.5	15.92	41	10:19.6	15.11
7	(United States) Glen Glass	Yokomo YZ-834B	Trinity	9	7	20	5:07.3	15.37	7	20	5:05.1	15.26	5	20	5:04.6	15.23	40	10:09.7	15.24
8	(United States) Mike Dunn	Yokomo YZ-834B	Trinity	4	8	20	5:07.7	15.39	6	20	5:04.5	15.23	7	20	5:12.8	15.64	40	10:12.2	15.31
9	(United States) Eustace Moore	Associated RC10		10	9	18	5:17.2	17.62	9	19	5:04.1	16.01	9	19	5:05.2	16.06	37	10:06.3	16.39
10	(United States) Gary Kyes	Yokomo YZ-834B	Trinity	8	3	21	5:11.4	14.83	10	12	3:13.3	16.11	10	16	5:09.06	19.35	37		

== See also ==
- The Dead Pool (1988)
