= 2015 IFMAR 1:10 Electric Off-Road World Championships =

Model car racing championship

Coordinates: 36.012406°N 140.085835°E

- [[File: |22em]]

Event Information
- Event Title: 2015 IFMAR 1:10 Electric Off-Road World Championships
- Dates run: 3 — 10 October 2015

Club Information
- Club Name: JMRCA Kanto
- Venue: Yatabe Arena
- Location: Tsukuba, Ibaraki Prefecture
- Host country: Japan
- Surface: Artificial turf

Vehicle Specification
- Class: 1:10 Electric Off-Road Buggy Schumacher Tires

2wd Title
- First: Spencer Rivkin (JPN); Associated–Reedy
- Second: Ryan Cavalieri (25x17px); Associated–Orion
- Third: Jared Tebo (USA); Kyosho–Orion
- TQ: Jared Tebo (USA)

4WD Title
- First: Bruno Coelho (POR); XRAY–LRP
- Second: Naoto Matsukura (JPN); Kyosho–Muchmore
- Third: David Ronnefalk (SWE); Hot Bodies–Orion
- TQ: Bruno Coelho (POR)

2015 IFMAR World Championships
- IFMAR 1:5 On-Road World Championship; IFMAR 1:10 Electric Off-Road World Championship; IFMAR 1:8 IC Track World Championship

The 2015 IFMAR 1:10 scale Electric Off-Road World Championships (2015年IFMAR EP オフロード世界選手権) is the 16th edition of the IFMAR 1:10 Electric Off-Road World Championship for 1:10 scale radio-controlled electric off-road buggies sanctioned by the International Federation of Model Auto Racing (IFMAR). It was run over two separate classes (2WD and 4WD) over eight days from 3 to 10 October, with each class running for three days each in total.

The national sanctioning body, Japan Model Racing Car Association (JMRCA), acted as the host nation on behalf of the Far East Model Car Association (FEMCA), with JMRCA Kanto acting as the host club for the championship taking place at the Yatabe Arena in Tsukuba in Ibaraki Prefecture. This was the arena's third time hosting the event and its second time hosting a 1:10 off-road race, the first since the 1995 event. It also became the first Off-Road Worlds to take place in an indoor venue since 1999.

The event was best known for its decision to be run on artificial turf for the first time, ending a tradition of dirt tracks in the tournament's entire 30-year history, a decision that has not been met without controversy. As a result of this controversy, the decision became known as "Astrogate" and the event as "Turf Worlds".

Jared Tebo and Steven Hartson, both of the United States, were the defending champions of the 2WD and 4WD class respectively. The 2WD class was won by Team Associated's Spencer Rivkin who, at the age of 16, became the youngest driver to win the 1:10 off-road race. After losing to Naoto Matsukura in electric touring car when he won the last two of three heats needed to secure a title the previous year, XRAY's Bruno Coelho of Portugal won the 4WD class.

== Background ==
During the annual general meeting for electric racing on September 26, when the Off-Road Worlds was still in session, Yatabe Arena was awarded hosting rights under IFMAR's bloc host rotation order as it turned to FEMCA, who represents Asia,

This was the Yokomo owned venue's third IFMAR event, its first was as a 1:10 electric off-road championship in 1995. They also hosted the 2000 Electric On-Road Worlds (1:12, PRO 10, touring car), the only time three official world championship events took place under the same host. Beside the Worlds, the circuit regularly hosts the JMRCA All-Japan Championships.

== Circuit ==
The circuit was originally famously built by Yokomo as a replica of the circuit used for the 1989 Worlds in Australia to help themselves prepare for the race three months prior, using soil samples collected from the track. The circuit was at the time built over a large plastic awning. The venue was reopened in 2011 following a major refurbishment work which included a new permanent building that was built.

There are currently four circuits in total, one is used for off-road racing in its original building, three others are on-road circuits housed under the new building, two are used as a drift circuit and the other used for on-road carpet racing.

When Yatabe Arena was given the right to host the world championship following the 2013 Worlds; at the time, the rulebook stated that the choice of surface was packable rock free dirt but a proposal was sent to IFMAR to run the event on artificial turf. On December 15, 2014, the rules was reamended to allow for the track to be entirely run on artificial turf following a vote by the four continental blocs with only ROAR of North America opposing, with some traditionalists branding this decision to run the world championship on a "touring car track with jumps" and in a public poll conducted by the NeoBuggy website, 62% of readers opposed the decision. The reason for this decision was in response to the rise of professional carpet racing for off-road racing, particularly in Europe, with its highly successful Euro Offroad Series, a winter multi-round professional championship taking place on indoor carpet tracks.

As off-road racing has traditionally taken place on dirt track, artificial turf in off-road racing is considered to be easy to set up, durable and easier to maintain and thus became a choice surface over dirt, with manufacturers producing parts and cars designed for racing on this type of high-grip surface. Also, it enables events to take place in commercial venues such as shopping malls.

Instead of using the existing track, a new track will be temporarily built over its indoor on-road circuit in the venue's newly built extension, the Center Building; to achieve this, the track require two layers of wooden sheeting put underneath the new surface to enable the piping, strips and corner dots to be screwed securely to the track. Because of it being an indoor venue, it is the first Off-Road Worlds to take place in an indoor venue since 1999 which took place in Finland.

The overall dimension of the track is 21.5m deep by 38m wide. The circuit was extensively modified from the track originally used in the pre-Worlds based on feedback from competitors that was criticized for "lacking obstacles". The most significant additions from the IFMAR warm-up race is the inclusion of the large tabletop, originally built but was left out by the organizers. Another change made for the two events was that the main straight was relocated front of the drivers stand to the opposite side of the track.

During the first day of racing, many of the drivers praised the overall layout some more positive than initially thought but criticized the circuit's five washboard section, with some branding it "stupid" especially from Jörn Neumann and Ryan Maifield and it being too high however the sections was praised by a few drivers including the defending 2WD champion, Jared Tebo who claimed it encouraged driver errors. The strips consisted of five black rubber strips placed underneath house doors, designed to force drivers to set their car to off-road racing ground clearance. Four times world champion Ryan Cavalieri praised the track, describing it "fun except for the black strips".

== Dates ==
The event was initially to take place on September 26 through October 3 but a decision was made to move it forward 7 days to prevent a clash with the prestigious All Japan Model & Hobby Show in Tokyo as a number of important JMRCA officials were required to be present at the show.

== Tires ==
Schumacher Racing Products have been announced as the sole supplier of control tires for the world championships. The tire used will be Mini Spike 2 Yellow compound with Med. Rear CAT foam insert for both 2WD and 4WD with Wide Stagger Rib Yellow compound with Med. Front CAT insert for the 4WD front.

== 2WD results ==
				Qual	A1					A2					A3					Total					Ref
Pos.	Driver	Car	Motor	Qual	Pos.	Laps	Time	FL	Pt.	Pos.	Laps	Time	FL	Pt.	Pos.	Laps	Time	FL	Pt.	Tot	Disc	Net	Laps	Time	Ref
1	Spencer Rivkin (USA)	Associated; RC10B5M	Reedy Sonic Mach 2	3	2	17	5:01.181	17.064	2	1	18	5:16.137	17.137	1	1	18	5:15.551	17.175	1	4	2	2	36	10:31.688
2	Jared Tebo (USA)	Kyosho; Ultima RZ6	Orion VST2	1	1	18	5:14.709	17.142	1	4	17	5:03.793	17.129	4	3	17	5:01.535	16.909	3	8	4	4	35	10:16.244
3	Ryan Cavalieri (USA)	Associated; RC10B5M	Orion VST2	4	3	17	5:02.505	17.294	3	2	17	5:01.328	17.301	2	2	17	5:00.830	17.131	2	7	3	4	34	10:02.158
4	Neil Cragg (GBR)	Associated; RC10	Reedy Sonic Mach 2	2	6	17	5:09.235	17.109	6	3	17	5:01.978	17.183	3	4	17	5:02.951	17.196	4	13	6	7	34	10:04.929
5	Jorn Neumann (GER)	Serpent; Spyder SRX-2 MM	Orion VST2	6	5	17	5:06.651	17.357	5	9	17	5:11.622	17.316	9	5	17	5:06.129	17.229	5	19	9	10	34	10:12.78
6	Ryan Maifield (USA)	Losi; 22 Development	Orion VST2	7	4	17	5:04.911	17.274	4	7	17	5:07.407	17.331	7	9	13	4:02.679	17.168	9	20	9	11	34	10:12.318
7	Martin Bayer (CZE)	X-Ray; XB2 2015	Orca RX3	9	9	17	5:16.223	17.522	9	5	17	5:07.079	17.394	5	6	17	5:06.884	17.403	6	20	9	11	34	10:13.963
8	Kody Numedahl (USA)	Associated; RC10	Reedy Sonic Mach 2	10	10	17	5:18.247	17.330	10	6	17	5:07.375	17.457	6	8	15	4:35.361	17.393	8	24	10	14	34	10:25.622
9	Michal Orlowski (POL)	Schumacher; KF2 Low Grip	Speed Passion 4.0	8	7	17	5:11.246	17.455	7	10	15	5:14.934	17.692	10	7	17	5:10.475	17.687	7	24	10	14	34	10:21.721
10	Lee Martin (GBR)	Yokomo; YZ-2	Muchmore Fleta ZX	5	8	17	5:15.735	17.185	8	8	17	5:10.982	17.251	8	10	0	0:00		10	26	10	16	34	10:26.717

			Qual	Finals					Ref
Pos.	Driver	Car	Qual	Pos.	Time	Laps	FL	Pt.	Ref
11	Elliott Boots (GBR)		12	B-1	17	5:05.137	17.34	1
12	Dakotah Phend (USA)		15	B-2	17	5:07.719	17.34	2
13	Joona Haatanen (FIN)		16	B-3	17	5:07.998	17.38	3
14	Kyle McBride (AUS)		13	B-4	17	5:08.401	17.354	4
15	Steven Hartson (USA)		18	B-5	17	5:11.722	17.301	5
16	Patrick Hofer (SUI)		17	B-6	17	5:13.671	17.693	6
17	Yusuke Sugiura (JPN)		11	B-7	17	5:14.453	17.574	7
18	Carson Wernimont (USA)		19	B-8	17	5:17.086	17.617	8
19	Kohta Akimoto (JPN)		20	B-9	16	5:05.549	17.765	9
20	Naoto Matsukura (JPN)	Kyosho; Ultima RB6 WC	14	B-10	16	5:14.79	17.735	10
21	Hupo Hoenigl (AUT)		21	C-1	17	5:08.171	17.613	1
22	Dustin Evans (USA)	Losi; 22-4	22	C-2	17	5:16.107	17.448	2
23	Hayato Matsuzaki (JPN)		29	C-3	17	5:18.594	17.701	3
24	Kaito Kodera (JPN)		25	C-4	16	5:01.052	17.577	4
25	Jesper Rasmussen (DEN)		28	C-5	16	5:03.074	17.69	5
26	Chris Sturdy (AUS)		30	C-6	16	5:03.229	17.912	6
27	Marc Rheinard (GER)		23	C-7	16	5:04.049	17.686	7
28	Bruno Coelho (POR)		26	C-8	14	4:31.951	17.821	8
29	Tom Cockerill (GBR)		24	C-9	8	2:32.178	18.143	9
30	Craig Collinson (GBR)	Team C TM2 V2	27	C-10	2	0:47.057	18.44	10
31	Travis Amezcua (USA)	Durango; DEX210F	31	D-1	17	5:15.639	17.796	1
32	Ty Tessmann (CAN)		32	D-2	17	5:17.625	17.863	2
33	Ben Jemison (GBR)		40	D-3	16	5:03.222	17.984	3
34	Kazuki Sasatsu (JPN)		33	D-4	16	5:05.68	17.797	4
35	Zacarias Villalba (ESP)		39	D-5	16	5:10.823	17.954	5
36	Raymond Munday (AUS)		37	D-6	16	5:12.145	17.956	6
37	Juriya Kajiwara (JPN)		38	D-7	16	5:13.22	17.828	7
38	Malin Karlsen (SWE)		34	D-8	16	5:16.553	18.496	8
39	Richard Lowe (GBR)		36	D-9	14	4:20.445	17.845	9
40	Shiniosuke Adachi (JPN)		35	D-10	0	0:00	0	10
41	Joshua Pain (AUS)	Yokomo; YZ-2	41	E-1	16	5:01.29	18.045	1
42	Sylvain Gallo Selva (FRA)		44	E-2	16	5:04.596	18.235	2
43	Nana Kaiho (JPN)		43	E-3	16	5:07.604	18.46	3
44	Kai Kikuchi (JPN)		42	E-4	16	5:10.803	18.15	4
45	Daisuke Sakamoto (JPN)		46	E-5	16	5:11.685	18.363	5
46	Kyle Moon (GBR)		48	E-6	16	5:12.098	18.14	6
47	Billy Easton (USA)	Serpent; Spyder SRX-2 MH	E-7	16	5:15.864	18.029	7
48	Nathan Ralls (GBR)		49	E-8	16	5:17.955	18.2	8
49	Andrew Smolnik (USA)	PR Racing; PRS1 V3	47	E-9	15	5:02.566	18.2	9
50	Peter Forster (SUI)		45	E-10	11	3:37.833	18.479	10
51	Bartomiej Zambrzycki (POL)		52	F-1	16	5:05.5	18.399	1
52	David Ronnefalk (SWE)		56	F-2	16	5:12.179	17.969	2
53	Fabian Widmer (SUI)		53	F-3	16	5:15.331	18.503	3
54	Oliver De Montfumat (FRA)		57	F-4	16	5:18.064	18.757	4
55	Guan-Shian Chen (TWN)		58	F-5	16	5:19.129	18.587	5
56	Ju Won Kyou (KOR)		60	F-6	15	5:00.912	18.284	6
57	Frederik Hovgaard (DEN)		51	F-7	15	5:01.974	18.058	7
58	Brett Birch (GBR)		55	F-8	15	5:02.461	18.748	8
59	Frederic Pain (FRA)		53	F-9	15	5:10.651	18.524	9
60	Hayate Obokata (JPN)		59	F-10	5	1:49.991	18.791	10
61	Kevin Lee (GBR)		61	G-1	16	5:16.075	18.185	1
62	Jonathan Yeung (HKG)		67	G-2	15	5:01.929	18.607	2
63	Mathieu Chaffardon (FRA)		64	G-3	15	5:06.873	19.009	3
64	John Wakins (AUS)		63	G-4	15	5:08.316	18.792	4
65	Tomoaki Kato (JPN)		69	G-5	15	5:08.393	18.662	5
66	Carson Yeung (HKG)		65	G-6	15	5:11.726	18.942	6
67	Scott Pettet (AUS)		70	G-7	15	5:14.585	19.191	7
68	Yu Kikuchi (JPN)		68	G-8	15	5:17.649	18.825	8
69	Yoshiki Masuda (JPN)		66	G-9	13	4:11.232	18.729	9
70	Kevin Seysen (FRA)		62	G-10	0	0:00		10
71	Mike Walker (USA)	PR Racing; PRS1 V3	H-1	15	5:05.165	18.661	1
72	Jori Mykknen (FIN)		73	H-2	15	5:06.264	18.883	2
73	Eiji Chiba (JPN)		72	H-3	15	5:06.543	18.863	3
74	Arne-Peder Flesvik (NOR)		78	H-4	15	5:07.374	18.88	4
75	Yoshiaki Amasaki (JPN)		76	H-5	15	5:09.606	18.781	5
76	Hajime Ishihara (JPN)		75	H-6	15	5:13.146	18.676	6
77	Yuichi Aoyagi (JPN)		77	H-7	15	5:15.173	19.319	7
78	Derek Mccloskey (IRL)		74	H-8	14	5:03.131	19.199	8
79	Yavuz Kura (GER)		80	H-9	14	5:06.186	19.302	9
80	Kouki Kato (JPN)		79	H-10	1	0:29.207	29.207	10
81	Frank Lemke (GER)		87	I-1	15	5:03.347	18.603	1
82	Satsuki Yasmane (JPN)		82	I-2	15	5:04.606	18.852	2
83	Juraj Hudy (SVK)		88	I-3	15	5:11.824	18.823	3
84	Hidetoshi Matsuda (JPN)		83	I-4	15	5:16.567	19.409	4
85	Da-De Sun (TWN)		90	I-5	15	5:17.489	19.156	5
86	Yuzo Furudate (JPN)		85	I-6	14	5:01.517	19.478	6
87	Mikko Helistl (FIN)		86	I-7	14	5:02.785	19.772	7
88	Yusuke Kobayashi (JPN)		81	I-8	14	5:05.349	18.218	8
89	Takahiro Ideura (JPN)		89	I-9	14	5:05.988	19.026	9
90	Tadashi Hattori (JPN)		84	I-10	5	1:40.476	19.224	10
91	Kiyotaka Ichikawa (JPN)		91	J-1	16	5:20.675	18.934	1
92	Kazuo Yokokawa (JPN)		96	J-2	15	5:06.858	19.547	2
93	Sven Rudig (AUT)		95	J-3	15	5:07.345	18.698	3
94	Michael Bolger (IRL)		92	J-4	15	5:11.802	19.249	4
95	Si Chang Su (KOR)		99	J-5	15	5:13.658	19.491	5
96	Masahiro Otsuka (JPN)		100	J-6	15	5:16.609	19.76	6
97	Yutaka Takizawa (JPN)		93	J-7	15	5:17.686	18.86	7
98	Hidemine Ono (JPN)		94	J-8	15	5:18.274	19.322	8
99	Tohru Iwata (JPN)		98	J-9	14	5:02.488	19.542	9
100	Satoshi Okayama (JPN)		97	J-10	14	5:10.262	19.629	10
101	Shin Chi Chou (TWN)		106	K-1	15	5:00.538	18.839	1
102	Yui Kaino (JPN)		103	K-2	15	5:05.126	19.17	2
103	Tzu-Chuen Wang (TWN)		108	K-3	15	5:10.101	19.726	3
104	Kazutaka Sera (JPN)		102	K-4	15	5:13.014	19.224	4
105	Yosuke Hosaka (JPN)		104	K-5	15	5:15.509	19.295	5
106	Yu-Kai Zeng (TWN)		107	K-6	15	4:54.512	18.737	6
107	Akihiko Takasaki (JPN)		105	K-7	14	5:00.419	19.388	7
108	Jing Ming Chen (TWN)		110	K-8	14	5:00.541	19.559	8
109	Rene Levetzow (AUT)		109	K-9	14	5:01.829	19.842	9
110	Alexandre Beauquier (FRA)		101	K-10	14	5:10.614	19.253	10
111	Shinya Kimura (JPN)		113	L-1	16	5:09.224	17.663	1
112	Scott Yang (TWN)	SWORKz; S12-1M	111	L-2	15	5:08.811	19.208	2
113	Daisuke Kato (JPN)		114	L-3	15	5:16.076	19.432	3
114	Yutaka Furuyama (JPN)		118	L-4	15	5:16.355	18.971	4
115	Ping Hung Hsu (TWN)		112	L-5	15	5:16.516	19.913	5
116	Ashley Peeler (AUS)		110	L-6	15	5:20.731	18.878	6
117	Motoyoshi Seki (JPN)		120	L-7	14	5:02.5	19.547	7
118	Satoshi Fujii (JPN)		115	L-8	14	5:03.521	19.347	8
119	Fumiyasu Toku (TWN)		117	L-9	14	5:10.27	19.616	9
120	Arnaud Taibi (FRA)		116	L-10	13	5:20.554	19.767	10
121	Tsuyoshi Ito (JPN)		122	M-1	15	5:11.994	19.643	1
122	Kenji Fukaya (JPN)		123	M-2	15	5:17.895	19.584	2
123	Ren Jie Chen (TWN)		125	M-3	14	5:03.813	19.85	3
124	Andrew Molkentin (AUS)		129	M-4	14	5:05.367	19.726	4
125	Mark Lim (SGP)		127	M-5	14	5:06.381	19.767	5
126	Toshiaki Fujimori (JPN)		130	M-6	14	5:06.996	19.63	6
127	Naoki Umezawa (JPN)		126	M-7	14	5:11.002	19.786	7
128	Susumu Tamura (JPN)		124	M-8	14	5:16.251	19.247	8
129	Keiiti Fujita (JPN)		121	M-9	14	5:19.171	19.939	9
130	David Church (GBR)		128	M-10	13	5:01.141	20.098	10
131	Lee Back Hee (KOR)		131	N-1	15	5:12.39	19.767	1
132	Kai Koivuranta (SWE)		132	N-2	14	5:03.54	19.764	2
133	Masanori Komada (JPN)		134	N-3	14	5:05.386	19.991	3
134	Chien-Fa Lin (TWN)		135	N-4	14	5:06.827	20.228	4
135	Mami Hoshino (JPN)		136	N-5	14	5:10.376	21.037	5
136	Jung-Nan Yen (TWN)		133	N-6	14	5:16.906	20.158	6
137	WK Foong (MYS)		138	N-7	14	5:17.718	21.038	7
138	Seiichi Takahashi (JPN)		137	N-8	14	5:18.36	20.447	8
139	Koichiro Teramoto (JPN)		139	N-9	13	5:01.049	20.931	9
140	Naomi Tomita (JPN)		140	N-10	13	5:02.876	21.075	10
141	Thierry Rosado (MON)		141	N-11	13	5:13.412	21.455	11
142	Masatsugu Ido (JPN)	Yokomo; YZ-2	142	N-12	6	2:12.592	19.119	12

== 4WD results ==
				Qual	A1					A2					A3					Total					Ref
Pos.	Driver	Car	Motor	Qual	Pos.	Laps	Time	FL	Pt.	Pos.	Laps	Time	FL	Pt.	Pos.	Laps	Time	FL	Pt.	Tot	Disc	Net	Laps	Time	Ref
1	Bruno Coelho (POR)	X-Ray; XB4 '16	LRP; Vector X20	1	1	17	5:00.652	17.263	1	1	17	5:01.589	17.405	1	10	DNS	DNS		10	12	10	2	34	10:02.241
2	Naoto Matsukura (JPN)	Kyosho; Lazer ZX-6	Muchmore; Fleta ZX	3	2	17	5:02.864	17.198	2	10	3	3:44.231	17.116	10	1	17	5:00.415	17.179	1	13	10	3	34	10:03.279
3	David Ronnefalk (SWE)	HB; D413	Orion; VST2 LW	4	3	17	5:03.312	17.409	3	4	17	5:09.686	17.303	4	2	17	5:01.992	17.262	2	9	4	5	34	10:05.304
4	Michal Orlowski (POL)	Schumacher; CAT K2	LRP; Vector X20 5.5	2	6	17	5:07.861	17.329	6	2	17	5:04.182	17.371	2	7	17	5:11.995	17.235	7	15	7	8	34	10:12.043
5	Ryan Maifield (USA)	Losi; YZ-4	Orion; VST2 LW	9	10	16	4:56.172	17.435	10	3	17	5:08.186	17.459	3	5	17	5:08.896	17.445	5	18	10	8	34	10:17.082
6	Tom Cockerill (GBR)	Yokomo; YZ-4	Yokomo; RP M	5	4	17	5:06.887	17.447	4	5	17	5:12.739	17.337	5	9	13	4:14.835	17.263	9	18	9	9	34	10:19.626
7	Martin Bayer (CZE)	X-Ray; XB4 2015	Orca; RX3	6	5	17	5:07.356	17.547	5	6	17	5:14.961	17.654	6	4	17	5:07.124	17.462	4	15	6	9	34	10:14.48
8	Yusuke Sugiura (JPN)	Kyosho; Lazer ZX-6	Muchmore; Fleta ZX	8	7	17	5:10.493	17.231	7	8	16	4:53.355	17.388	8	3	17	5:06.229	17.298	3	18	8	10	34	10:16.722
9	Hayato Matsuzaki (JPN)	Yokomo; YZ-4	Yokomo; RP M	10	8	17	5:13.965	17.615	8	7	17	5:22.116	17.499	7	6	17	5:09.096	17.452	6	21	8	13	34	10:23.061
10	Jared Tebo (USA)	Kyosho; Lazer ZX-6	Orion; VST2 LW	7	9	17	5:16.128	17.305	9	9	7	5:17.259	17.487	9	8	17	5:17.256	17.336	8	26	9	17	34	10:33.384

			Qual	Finals					Ref
Pos.	Driver	Car	Qual	Pos.	Time	Laps	FL	Pt.	Ref
11	Lee Martin (GBR)			B-1	17	5:04.255		1
12	Masatsugu Ido (JPN)			B-2	17	5:07.56		2
13	Carson Wernimont (USA)			B-3	17	5:08.187		3
14	Marc Rheinard (GER)			B-4	17	5:10.582		4
15	Kohta Akimoto (JPN)			B-5	17	5:12.052		5
16	Kai Kikuchi (JPN)			B-6	17	5:12.568		6
17	Jörn Neumann (GER)			B-7	17	5:13.127		7
18	Ryan Cavalieri (USA)			B-8	17	5:16.612		8
19	Ty Tessmann (CAN)	HB; D413		B-9	5	1:37.422		9
20	Kody Numedahl (USA)			B-10	0	0:00		10
21	Kaito Kodera (JPN)	Yokomo; YZ-4		C-1	17	5:03.753		1
22	Shinya Kimura (JPN)			C-2	17	5:07.038		2
23	Joona Haatanen (FIN)			C-3	17	5:11.89		3
24	Elliot Boots (GBR)			C-4	17	5:12.453		4
25	Dustin Evans (USA)			C-5	17	5:13.924		5
26	Hupo Honigl (AUT)			C-6	16	5:00.797		6
27	Dakotah Phend (USA)			C-7	16	5:01.229		7
28	Malin Karlsen (SWE)			C-8	16	5:01.946		8
29	Shiniosuke Adachi (JPN)			C-9	16	5:02.42		9
30	Juriya Kajiwara (JPN)			C-10	16	5:05.6		10
31	Neil Cragg (GBR)			D-1	17	5:11.426		1
32	Chris Sturdy (AUS)			D-2	17	5:16.569		2
33	Philipp Huber (SUI)			D-3	16	5:00.627		3
34	Frederik Hovgaard (DEN)			D-4	16	5:00.808		4
35	Ben Jemison (GBR)			D-5	16	5:04.121		5
36	Jesper Rasmussen (DEN)			D-6	16	5:12.799		6
37	Nana Kaiho (JPN)			D-7	16	5:13.121		7
38	Steve Hartson (USA)			D-8	15	4:36.36		8
39	Craig Collinson (GBR)			D-9	15	5:02.003		9
40	Kyle Ward-McBride (AUS)			D-10	1	0:20.449		10
41	Billy Easton (USA)			E-1	17	5:13.878		1
42	Daisuke Sakamoto (JPN)			E-2	17	5:15.82		2
43	Fabian Luca Widmer (SUI)			E-3	16	5:01.416		3
44	Raymond Munday (AUS)			E-4	16	5:04.226		4
45	Richard Lowe (GBR)			E-5	16	5:04.979		5
46	Kevin Lee (GBR)			E-6	16	5:09.208		6
47	Zacarias Villalba (ESP)			E-7	16	5:14.223		7
48	Bartolomiej Zambrzycki (POL)			E-8	15	5:01.041		8
49	Joshua Pain (AUS)			E-9	13	5:12.685		9
50	Peter Forster (SUI)			E-10	10	3:18.789		10
51	Spencer Rivkin (USA)			F-1	17	5:19.974		1
52	Andrew Smolnik (USA)			F-2	16	5:11.895		2
53	Oliver De Montfumat (FRA)			F-3	16	5:12.945		3
54	Nathan Ralls (GBR)			F-4	16	5:14.454		4
55	Brett Birch (GBR)			F-5	16	5:19.826		5
56	Kevin Seysen (FRA)			F-6	16	5:19.858		6
57	Guan-Shian Chen (TWN)			F-7	16	5:20.301		7
58	Sylvain Gallo Selva (FRA)			F-8	15	5:00.492		8
59	Yusuke Kobayashi (JPN)			F-9	15	5:04.477		9
60	Alexandre Privat (FRA)			F-10	6	1:55.514		10
61	Mathieux Chaffardon (FRA)			G-1	16	5:06.61		1
62	Juraj Hudy (SVK)			G-2	16	5:07.017		2
63	Nick Sava (USA)			G-3	16	5:16.78		3
64	Ju Won Kyou (KOR)			G-4	16	5:17.371		4
65	Alexandre Beauquier (FRA)			G-5	16	5:17.983		5
66	Kiyotaka Ichikawa (JPN)			G-6	15	5:01.364		6
67	Scott Pettet (AUS)			G-7	15	5:05.119		7
68	John Wakins (AUS)			G-8	15	5:08.003		8
69	Kouki Kato (JPN)			G-9	15	5:13.625		9
70	Si Chang Su (KOR)			G-10	14	4:59.601		10
71	Yu Kikuchi (JPN)			H-1	16	5:13.731		1
72	Tadashi Hattori (JPN)			H-2	16	5:15.674		2
73	Sven Rudig (AUT)			H-3	16	5:21.46		3
74	Frank Lemke (GER)			H-4	15	5:03.482		4
75	Hidetoshi Matsuda (JPN)			H-5	15	5:05.905		5
76	Yutaka Takizawa (JPN)			H-6	15	5:06.954		6
77	Frederic Pain (FRA)			H-7	15	5:08.358		7
78	Shih Chi Chou (TWN)			H-8	15	5:10.799		8
79	Michael Bolger (IRL)			H-9	14	5:07.227		9
80	Yuichi Aoyagi (JPN)			H-10	11	3:48.104		10
81	Kyle Moon (GBR)			I-1	16	5:20.392		1
82	Kazuki Sasatsu (JPN)			I-2	16	5:20.568		2
83	Mike Walker (USA)			I-3	15	5:00.993		3
84	Yavuz Kura (GER)			I-4	15	5:06.071		4
85	Derek Mccloskey (IRL)			I-5	15	5:10.365		5
86	Tsuyoshi Ito (JPN)			I-6	15	5:11.172		6
87	Hidemine Ono (JPN)			I-7	15	5:11.59		7
88	Ashley Peeler (AUS)			I-8	15	5:15.274		8
89	Da-De Sun (TPE)			I-9	14	5:03.837		9
90	Tohru Iwata (JPN)			I-10	6	1:58.717		10
91	Yoshiaki Amasaki (JPN)			J-1	16	5:15.967		1
92	Tomoaki Kato (JPN)			J-2	15	5:04.531		2
93	Yutaka Furuyama (JPN)			J-3	15	5:09.642		3
94	Mark Lim (SGP)			J-4	15	5:14.694		4
95	Jori Mykknen (FIN)			J-5	15	5:18.473		5
96	Kazutaka Sera (JPN)			J-6	15	5:18.783		6
97	Akihiko Takasaki (JPN)			J-7	14	5:00.838		7
98	Lee Back Hee (KOR)			J-8	14	5:08.702		8
99	Ping Hung Hsu (TPE)			J-9	6	2:08.095		9
100	Yu-Kai Zeng (TPE)			J-10	4	1:25.497		10
101	Arne-Peder Flesvik (NOR)			K-1	15	5:06.218		1
102	Carson YEUNG (HKG)			K-2	15	5:12.717		2
103	Fumiyasu Toku (TPE)			K-3	15	5:14.42		3
104	Scott Yang (TPE)			K-4	15	5:15.218		4
105	Tzu-Chuen Wang (TPE)			K-5	15	5:19.965		5
106	Rene Levetzow (AUT)			K-6	15	5:23.986		6
107	Masahiro Otsuka (JPN)			K-7	14	5:00.433		7
108	Jonathan Yeung (HKG)			K-8	14	5:00.87		8
109	Satoshi Okayama (JPN)			K-9	14	5:01.676		9
110	Ren Jie Chen (TPE)			K-10	12	4:23.852		10
111	Travis Amezcua (USA)			L-1	16	5:01.033		1
112	Yui Kaino (JPN)			L-2	15	5:02.158		2
113	Motoyoshi Seki (JPN)			L-3	15	5:09.717		3
114	Kazuo Yokokawa (JPN)			L-4	15	5:13.878		4
115	Jing Ming Chen (TPE)			L-5	15	5:18.486		5
116	Daisuke Kato (JPN)			L-6	14	5:04.14		6
117	Susumu Tamura (JPN)			L-7	14	5:05.351		7
118	David Church (GBR)			L-8	14	5:07.479		8
119	Mikko Helistola (FIN)			L-9	14	5:14.525		9
120	Andrew Molkentin (AUS)			L-10	14	5:20.416		10
121	Koichiro Teramoto (JPN)			M-1	14	5:00.407		1
122	Naoki Umezawa (JPN)			M-2	14	5:04.576		2
123	Kai Koivuranta (SWE)			M-3	14	5:05.114		3
124	Jung-Nan Yen (TPE)			M-4	14	5:06.855		4
125	Chien-Fa Lin (TPE)			M-5	14	5:07.803		5
126	WK Foong (MYS)			M-6	14	5:10.829		6
127	Toshiaki Fujimori (JPN)			M-7	13	5:04.526		7
128	Thierry Rosado (MON)			M-8	13	5:20.11		8

== Entries ==
Entrants	Alloc.	2WD	4WD	Ref.
ROAR	32	14	15	
FEMCA	42	83		
FAMAR	32	0	0	
EFRA	32	48	48	
IFMAR	12	n/a		
Total	150	142	128	

A number of federations submitted their entry lists in August. The Association of Australia Radio Controlled Model Car Club (AARCMCC) announced in August that they will be sending nine drivers. Remotely Operated Auto Racers (ROAR), representing the North America intended to send 15 drivers with all but one (who is a Canadian) from the United States, half of its allocation total. European Federation of Radio Operated Model Automobiles (EFRA) sent 58 drivers but with late cancellations and no-shows, 48 drivers competed. British Radio Car Association (BRCA), representing the United Kingdom, being the majority being the most with 12 drivers followed by Federation Française de Voitures Radio Commandees (FFVRC), representing France, with 7.

The most entries per country is the Japan Model Racing Car Association (JMRCA) with a total of 54 entries Fourth Association of Model Auto Racing (FAMAR), representing South Africa, South America and the rest of the world did not send any drivers.

== See also ==
Previous IFMAR Worlds previously taking place in Yatabe Arena

- 1995 IFMAR 1:10 Electric Off-Road World Championship
- 2000 Electric On-Road World Championships
  - 2000 IFMAR 1:12 On-Road World Championship
  - 2000 IFMAR PRO 10 World Championship
  - 2000 IFMAR ISTC World Championship

== Bibliography ==
- "2015 IFMAR EP OFF-ROAD WORLD CHAMPIONSHIP Event Program" (PDF). 2015 EP Off-road World Championship Organizing Committee. 2015-09-28.
- "2015 IFMAR 世界選手権". Japan Model Racing Car Association. 2015-08-27.
- "IFMAR 1/10 Off-Road 2wd: Final Standings" (PDF). LiveTime. 2015-10-06.
- "IFMAR 1/10 Off-Road 4wd: Final Standings" (PDF). LiveTime. 2015-10-10. Archived from the original (PDF) on 2016-03-04.
