= Japan Model Racing Car Association =

- Sport: Model car racing
- Category: Radio-controlled racing
- Jurisdiction: Japan
- Abbreviation: JMRCA
- Founded: 1974
- Affiliation: IFMAR, FEMCA
- Headquarters: Chiyoda, Tokyo
- President: Kazuhiko Nakanishi
- (founded): 1971

Official website
- www.jmrca.jp
- (Japan)

Japan Model Racing Car Association (日本モデルラジオコントロールカー協会) is a governing body for radio controlled car racing in Japan. As it represents domestic racing in Japan, the JMRCA is affiliated with IFMAR

== History ==
It was founded in February 1971 with the backing of Kyosho, the industry leader at the time, to feed on an increasing demand for R/C car racing popularised by U.S. military personnels stationed in Japan in preparation for the Vietnam War. Its first race was the First Japan-America Goodwill RC Car Race at the following month, hosted jointly by the JMRCA and the U.S. Air Force Model Club held at their Tokyo Tachikawa Base.

One of its first races hosted by JMRCA was a championship race for 1/8 scale racing cars produced by Kyosho. Taking place at a specially constructed race course at Fuji Speedway, the winning driver was rewarded with a trip to Hawaii.

The first championship took place in 1978 for 1:8 scale pan cars and the first electric car championship was a year later.

== Non-Japanese winners ==
Each year, JMRCA have invited drivers from other countries to compete but as invited drivers, only Japanese drivers are eligible to claim the championship titles, thus the title is awarded to the next best Japanese finisher. As of 2026, only seven foreign drivers have won the All-Japan Championships, either from Germany or the United States and one from the United Kingdom, won in 2015 when the championship was run as part of the warm-up event in preparation for the forthcoming IFMAR 1:10 Electric Off-Road World Championship. Ronald Völker is the only driver to have achieved this more than once.

Year	Class	Winner	Car	Motor
1984	1:12 EP Racing	(United States) Joel Johnson	Delta	Trinity
1987	1:10 EP Off-Road 2WD	(United States) Gil Losi, Jr.	Associated RC10	
1995	1:10 EP Racing	(United States) Brian Baker	Yokomo	
2006	1:10 EP Off-Road 2WD	(United States) Billy Easton	Associated RC10	
2007	1:10 EP Touring Super Expert	(Germany) Marc Rheinard	Tamiya	
2009	1:10 EP Touring Super Expert	(Germany) Ronald Völker	Yokomo	
2010	1:10 EP Touring Super Expert	(Germany) Ronald Völker	Yokomo	
2011	1:10 EP Touring Super Expert	(Germany) Ronald Völker	Yokomo	
2015	1:10 EP Off-Road 2WD	(United Kingdom) Lee Martin	Yokomo B-Max III	Muchmore
