= Mini Racer RC-12 =

Yokobori (Yokomo) RC-12 manual

Mini Racer RC-12 is 1/12 scale RC car manufactured by Yokomo from 1977 to the early 1980s. It was produced during the brand name change from Yokobori Mokei to Yokomo; even you can see this on the RC-12 box due to on back side of the box had both brands, Yokobori Mokei and the Yokomo labels on it.

There were three different models in the RC-12 series. "Mini Racer RC-12":

RC-12e

RC-12

RC-12Jr

(RC-12Jr USA as a variant).

-The RC-12e It is the same model than Associated Electrics model but with the difference that all upgrade parts were added as standard on Japanese version.

-The RC-12 that had a metal pan narrow chassis (thin version) with a overlapped sheet to accommodate battery packs, 2 servos, an MSC parts (included on kit) and a receiver; the spaces were designed to accommodate Futaba Brand electronic accessories.

-The Mini Racer RC-12 Jr came with a metal pan but overwide to accommodate the battery pack for MSC, the receptor and a central battery case, this parts attached to the chassis by rubber bands, this kit came on a box for assembly with instructions and decals.

*Variation "Mini Racer RC-12 Jr U.S.A. shared the assembly of the RC-12Jr. kit but came pre-assembled, had a pre-painted/clear body pending on whether it was purchased (Japan or USA) AND came on a box that similar to a treasure chest with a plastic window to see the model.

Motoring:

-The RC-12, RC-12Jr & RC-12Jr USA Models had a 280 Mabuchi Motor.

-The RC-12e have same motor as Associated Electrics.

Wheels & Tires:

-Sponge tires and plastic wheels (Front Wheels are thicker and smaller than rear ones)

Optional Parts & Upgrades:

-Rear Deck Spoiler,

-Optional drivers (vacuum formed) in the cockpit (for the models that applied)

-Bearings for front wheels, rear wheels and steering,

-Pinions

-Spur gears

-380 Mabuchi Motor

-380 Reedy Modified Motor

Accessories:

-Quick Car Battery Charger.

-Regular Battery Charger.

-Battery packs.

Dimensions:

*RC-12e

-Same as Associated Electrics

*RC-12, RC-12Jr & USA Versions

-Wheelbase: 190mm

- -Leng (with body): 350mm

-Width (fr axle with wheels):157mm

-Width (rr axle with wheels): 163mm

Ref: Yokomo Catalogue 1979, 1980, 1981 & 1982

== Comparison ==
Model	Body	Details
Mini-Racer RC-12	Porsche 917-30KL; Lamborghini Countach LP-500S; Ferrari 512BB	280S Motor; Titanium rear axle; 48 pitch spur gears; Duralumin chassis; 12,800 Yen
Mini-Racer RC-12 Jr	BMW 320i Turbo; DeTomaso Pantera GTS; Porsche 936; Lancia Stratos Turbo; Chevrlet Vega; Pontiac Trans Am; McLaren M20; Ferrari 312PB; DeTomaso Pantera GTS; TOJ SC03; A.J Foyt Indy 500 Coyote	280S Motor; Titanium rear axle; 48 pitch spur gears; Duralumin chassis; 10,000 Yen
Mini-Racer RC-12 Jr U.S.A	Alfa Romeo 33T 12 Renault Alpine A442 Porsche 917-30KL Porsche 936 Ferrari 512BB Ferrari 365GT Ferrari 312PB BMW 320i Turbo DeTomaso Pantera GTS Lancia Stratos Turbo TOJ SC03 A.J Foyt Indy 500 Coyote	280S Motor; Titanium rear axle; 48 pitch spur gears; Duralumin chassis; Factory Painted Body; 10,000 Yen
