= Yokomo YZ-834B =

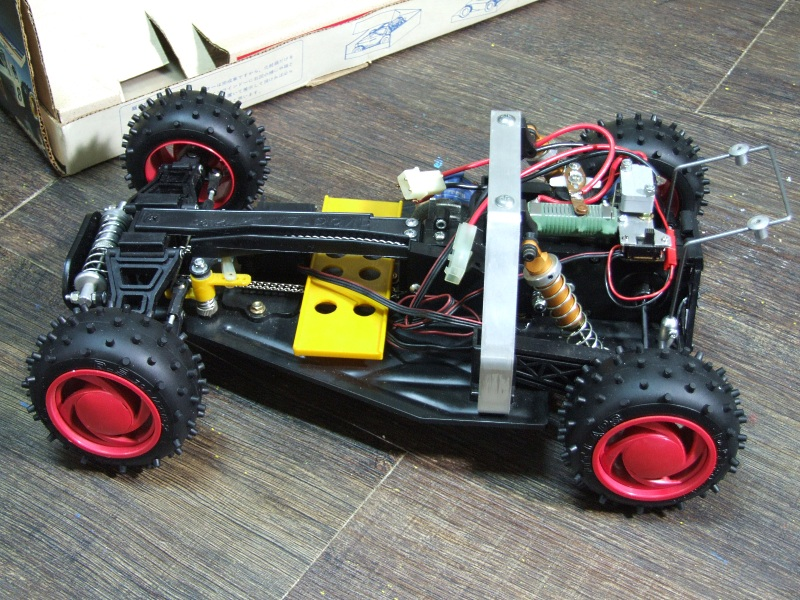
Wonder Dog Fighter SE

RPS SE

Yokomo YZ-834B "Dog Fighter" is a 1/10 scale electric-powered 4WD radio-controlled vehicle made by Yokomo. Introduced in 1983 for off-road racing, it has been cited by the website, LiveRC, as the first racing specific 4WD buggy The car was marketed in Europe, sold by Graupner, as the Graupner Dogfighter and in the US by Delta Systems, as the Delta Dogfighter.

As the YZ-834B required numerous upgrades and an investment of US$500 (equivalent to $1,434 in 2024) to make it competitive, Yokomo introduced the mail-order only SE 4WD featuring a host of parts that made the car competitive straight out of the box for US$200 (equivalent to $573.71 in 2024) despite being offered with a Yokomo 05R stock motor and a mechanical speed controller.

The RPS/Yokomo Dog Fighter SE was introduced following the 1985 IFMAR 1:10 Electric Off-Road World Championships win by Gil Losi Jr. The car was marketed by Ranch Pit Stop (hence RPS), a hobby retailer owned by Losi Jr's father; who later became known as Team Losi three years after.

Ron Rossetti used this version of the car to win the 1986 ROAR 1:10 Off-Road National Championships.

Despite its success in racing, including winning the aforementioned IFMAR Worlds, it was criticized for its low ground clearance, which meant it was unsuited to the UK racing.

The YZ-834B was replaced by YZ-870C in 1987.

Year	Model	Details	Known issues
1983	Dog Fighter 834B (not pictured) Rare original release model with one shock absorber each end, exposed alloy roll bar, yellow wheels and black body pan.	Front mono alloy shock; Rear mono alloy shock; Chain drive 4WD system; Front one-way axles with solid center shaft; Large bumper, extends to middle of front wheels; Rear ball differential; Rear anti-roll bar; Dog Fighter lexan body with enclosed shocks and exposed alu roll bar; 1.75-inch yellow wheels and Dunlop engraved spike tires; 05R stock motor for 8 minute race; Mechanical speed controller Forward/Break. and with a relay for reverse; original cost 19,800 Yen; Pristine examples now changing hands for UK£500+	The first version of the nylon gears weren't sturdy enough; Motor plate was weak and prone to bending if misused. This problem has never been fixed through the last 834B model
1985	Wonder Dog Fighter (could be late 1984)	Thicker chassis with small bumper; Upgraded front shock; Rear dual shock; Torque limiter; Improved gears (they made new gears in 1984); Longer front lower arms; Reinforced rear swing arms; New Wonder Dog Fighter body based on Bolink Funco body	New rear shocks leak
1985	Wonder Dog Fighter Limited Edition	360SX Twin Turbo motor for 6 minute race; 28,000 Yen	
1986	Wonder Dog Fighter SE - 834B SE	Super Aero wheels (aka tornado wheels); Hot Laps R-5 2" tires; 360SX Twin Turbo motor for 6-minute race; 29,800 Yen	
1986	Dog Fighter RPS SE	Fiberglass Chassis with small black bumper; New body and new roll bar; Improved shocks; 05R stock motor; New RPS tires made by Pro-line with 1.75" yellow wheels; SE10 Standard Kit; SE11 Deluxe Kit (with NMB bearings)	https://www.rctech.net/forum/vintage-forum/1138973-yokomo-rps-losi-rps-special.html

== Works cited ==
- Howell, John (December 1992). "Top 10 Innovative R/C Cars of All Time". Radio Control Car Action. Air Age Media.
- Crabb, Jim (August 1988). "Super Dog Fighter, Yokomo YZ-870C" (PDF). Radio Race Car.
- Kyes, Gary (May 1987). "RPS Yokomo SE" (PDF). R/C Model Cars.
- Denevi, Bernard (February 1986). "Preparation Graupner Dogfighter". Auto8.
