= 2020 IFMAR 1:12 Electric Track World Championships =

Event Information
- Event Title: 2020 IFMAR 1:12 Electric On-Road World Championships
- Dates run: 8 - 12 January 2020

Club Information
- Venue: Middleton Hall, Centre:MK
- Location: Milton Keynes,
- Host country: United Kingdom
- Surface: Carpet

Vehicle Specification
- Class: 1:12 Electric LMP12

Stock Class
- First: (United Kingdom) Andy Murray; Schumacher
- Second: (United Kingdom) Matthew Varah; Roche
- Third: (United Kingdom) Ben Vincent; Roche
- TQ: (United Kingdom) Andy Murray; Schumacher

Modified Class
- First: (United States) Marc Rheinard; Schumacher
- Second: (Poland) Michal Orlowski; Schumacher
- Third: (Japan) Yoshiyasu Yanagisawa; CRC
- TQ: (Poland) Michal Orlowski; Schumacher

The 2020 IFMAR 1:12 scale Electric On-Road World Championships is the 2020 IFMAR World Championships for 1:12 radio-controlled pan car sanctioned by the International Federation of Model Auto Racing (IFMAR). It was run over two separate classes (Stock and Modified) over five days from 8 to 12 January. With two days practice followed by two days qualifying with the finals for both classes on the final day.

The national sanctioning body, British Radio Car Association (BRCA), acted as the host nation on behalf of the European Federation of Radio Operated Model Automobiles (EFRA), with the championship taking place at Middleton Hall, Centre:MK in city of Milton Keynes which is Buckinghamshire.

== Venue/Circuit ==
The IFMAR Worlds takes place at the Middleton Hall of Centre:MK which acts as event space. The centre has, in the past, hosted radio-controlled racing events there in the past few years. This includes the only 1:12 scale Reedy International Race of Champions in 2016, an unofficial GT12 world championship event the following year, British Off Road Grand Prix for 1:10 electric off-road and rounds of BRCA 1:12 National Championship.

All those events along with the IFMAR Worlds takes place on a temporary circuit, running on carpet. The organisers hosted a trades show and run various initiatives to increase awareness. This different from all previous championships which were hosted by established clubs.

The racing surface was Track GT carpet measuring approx. 35M x 16M with track markings being square white tube, carpet overlay and apex markings.

== Results ==
=== Modified ===
Pos.	Driver	Car	Motor	No	A1				A2				A3				Total	
Pos.	Driver	Car	Motor	No	Time	Laps	FL	Pt.	Time	Laps	FL	Pt.	Time	Laps	FL	Pt.	Time	Pt.
1	(Germany) Marc Rheinard	Schumacher Eclipse 3	Muchmore	3	08:10.5	00:11.6	00:12.0	2	08:11.6	00:11.7	00:12.0	1	08:08.8	00:11.5	00:11.9	2	00:11.5	3
2	(Poland) Michal Orlowski	Schumacher Eclipse 3	LRP	5	08:06.9	00:11.7	00:12.2	5	08:00.6	00:11.7	00:12.0	3	08:08.3	00:11.6	00:11.9	1	00:11.6	4
4	(United Kingdom) Olly Jefferies	Schumacher Eclipse 3		7	08:00.6	00:11.6	00:12.0	4	08:00.3	00:11.6	00:12.0	2	07:56.7	00:11.5	00:11.9	4	00:11.5	6
5	(United Kingdom) Ollie Payne	Roche	HobbyWing	4	08:11.6	00:11.6	00:12.0	3	08:10.3	00:11.5	00:12.6	4	03:03.3	00:11.6	00:12.2	10	00:11.5	7
6	(Sweden) Alexander Hagberg	XRAY X12	HobbyWing	1	01:26.3	00:11.8	00:14.4	9	08:16.4	00:11.7	00:12.4	7	08:09.4	00:11.4	00:11.9	3	00:11.4	10
7	(Sweden) Markus Hellquist	Xray X12	HobbyWing	12	08:01.5	00:11.7	00:12.3	7	08:10.5	00:11.7	00:12.3	5	08:06.9	00:11.7	00:12.5	9	00:11.7	12
8	(Japan) Hayato Ishioka	CRC CK25-HT	HobbyWing	6	08:07.4	00:11.6	00:12.2	6	08:11.2	00:11.4	00:12.3	6	08:06.6	00:11.5	00:12.5	8	00:11.4	12
9	(Japan) Toshinobu Yanagisawa	Yokomo YRX12	HobbyWing	14	01:50.4	00:12.3	00:18.4	10	08:00.8	00:11.7	00:12.3	8	08:10.3	00:11.6	00:12.3	6	00:11.6	14
10	(Germany) Jörn Neumann	Schumacher Eclipse 3		8	03:13.7	00:11.6	00:12.9	8	08:08.6	00:11.4	00:12.5	9	08:03.2	00:11.6	00:12.4	7	00:11.4	15

=== Stock ===
Pos.	Driver	Car	Motor	No	A1				A2				A3				Total	
Pos.	Driver	Car	Motor	No	Time	Laps	FL	Pt.	Time	Laps	FL	Pt.	Time	Laps	FL	Pt.	Time	Pt.
1	(United Kingdom) Andy Murray	Schumacher Eclipse 3	Trinity X-factor	62	08:12.4	00:12.9	00:13.3	1	08:11.7	00:12.8	00:13.3	1	00:00.0	00:00.0	00:00.0	10	00:12.8	2
2	(United Kingdom) Matthew Varah	Roche Rapide P12 evo	Trinity X-factor	63	08:13.1	00:12.8	00:13.3	2	08:12.3	00:12.8	00:13.3	2	01:17.9	00:13.0	00:15.6	9	00:12.8	4
3	(United Kingdom) Ben Vincent	Roche p12 evo	Trinity x factor	65	08:04.7	00:12.9	00:13.8	8	08:11.9	00:12.9	00:13.7	4	08:03.4	00:12.8	00:13.4	1	00:12.8	5
4	(Belgium) Olivier Bultynck	Roche	LRP	64	08:07.3	00:12.9	00:13.5	4	08:08.0	00:12.9	00:13.6	3	08:08.7	00:12.9	00:13.6	3	00:12.9	6
5	(Germany) Max Mächler	AWESOMATIX	HobbyWing	70	08:08.2	00:12.8	00:13.6	5	08:10.1	00:12.9	00:14.0	7	08:05.5	00:12.9	00:13.5	2	00:12.8	7
6	(United States) Jeff Dayger	CRC	Trinity	26	08:06.2	00:12.9	00:13.5	3	05:15.7	00:12.8	00:13.7	9	08:10.3	00:12.9	00:13.6	4	00:12.8	7
7	(United States) Andrew Knapp	CRC CK25	Trinity	61	08:00.6	00:12.9	00:13.7	6	08:12.8	00:13.0	00:13.7	5	08:04.1	00:12.9	00:13.8	6	00:12.9	11
8	(United Kingdom) Matthew Lax	XRAY X12	Trinity	69	08:02.8	00:13.1	00:13.8	7	08:01.7	00:13.2	00:14.2	8	08:04.0	00:13.2	00:13.8	5	00:13.1	12
9	(United States) Brian Wynn	Team CRC CK25	Trinity X Factor	67	00:00.0	00:00.0	00:00.0	10	08:05.1	00:13.2	00:13.9	6	08:12.4	00:13.2	00:14.1	7	00:00.0	13
10	(United Kingdom) Morgan Williams	roche	Trinity	87	06:08.3	00:13.1	00:14.2	9	00:00.0	00:00.0	00:00.0	10	08:01.6	00:13.2	00:14.2	8	00:13.1	17
