= Ball differential =

Type of differential used on RC cars

An exploded diagram of a ball differential

A ball differential is a type of differential typically used on radio-controlled cars. It differs from a geared differential by using several small ball bearings rotating between two plates, instead of bevel gears.

== History ==
The first ball differential for Radio-controlled Cars was designed by Cecil Schumacher, a British motor sport engineer working at Cosworth and founder/owner of his eponymous model brand. Although a patent was applied for, it was denied as the idea had already been implemented into a lawn mower. Radio-controlled cars were still a new application for the ball differential and Schumacher is generally considered the modern day inventor of the concept. Such was the popularity of the ball differential, originally applied in 1/12 on-road cars, that he formed his eponymous company.

To this date ball differentials remain very popular in the radio-controlled car market. They are used on almost every 1/12 on-road, scale touring car (although the sealed gear differential is gaining popularity in this class) and electric off-road produced by many manufacturers. In these classes they are regarded as the industry standard. Schumacher Racing Products even use ball differentials on their nitro truck range, these however use strong materials and larger and harder ball bearings.

== Basic principles ==
Radio-controlled car manufacturers use the same basic design Schumacher created in the 1980s. The main part of the differential is a drive gear (or pulley in a belt transmission) with multiple holes cut through it, following its outside diameter. These holes are slightly larger than the width of the ball bearings, so that the balls, commonly around 2 mm diameter in a model car, sit inside the holes of the gear/pulley.

On either side of the gear are the thrust washers. The thrust washers are pushed against the ball bearings inside the gear by Belleville washers. On one side of the gear is an adjusting collar, which allows for adjustments in the amount of slip allowed by the differential. A thrust bearing (or thrust race), on the opposite side of the gear, is used to stop the differential from loosening the retaining screw holding the output cups, used to attach the differential to the axle, onto the differential.

As the screw is tightened it pushes the Belleville and thrust washers onto the gear/pulley. This creates contact between the washers and ball bearings inside of the gear/pulley. The friction created by the contact between the washers and ball bearings is, aided by grease (commonly silicone grease), designed so that as one washer moves, the ball bearings rotate.

As the washer on one side of the gear rotates, the rotation of the balls causes the other washer to rotate in the opposite direction, because any rotating ball will have opposite sides moving in opposite directions .

Differential movement is achieved through the process of the thrust washers rotating with the ball bearings. The retaining screw is designed so the differential can be easily adjusted by tightening or loosening the screw, consequently changing force. This makes the differential more adjustable than geared differentials, but there is a lower limit since the drive is by friction so there is always some limited slip action.

There are several types of balls used in this type of differential. Some of the most common ball materials used by high end racers are ceramic and tungsten based. The advantage to something like ceramic based balls is that they are much harder, and have a longer life expectancy. Oftentimes when using less hard materials, the balls will "flat spot" causing a semi locked direction of the ball. This causes the differential to not turn with a smooth feeling and leaves it with an overall "gritty" feeling.
