= Weatherstripping =

Process of sealing doors, windows, etc against the elements

Weatherstripping is the process of sealing openings such as doors, windows, and trunks from the waters above. The term can also refer to the materials used to carry out such sealing processes. The goal of weatherstripping is to prevent rain and water from entering entirely or partially and accomplishes this by either returning or rerouting water. A secondary goal of weatherstripping is to keep interior air in, thus saving energy on heating and air conditioning.

== Automotive ==
=== Purpose ===
Automotive weatherstripping is used extensively aboard automobiles, and can be found anywhere the interior compartment must be sealed from the environment. It must be functional and cohesive with the body design of the vehicle. In addition to factors standard to weatherstripping, additional factors must be considered for vehicles, specifically in the engineering of the parts. For example, the weatherstripping must function the same while the vehicle is parked and at full speed; be flexible to accommodate motion vibrations; endure extreme temperatures of hot and cold; withstand long periods of sun exposure; and resist automotive liquids such as oil, gasoline, and windshield washer fluid (methanol). Weatherstripping also plays a part in maintaining satisfactory ride quality in the vehicle, being partially responsible for sealing noise out from the passenger compartment.

- Prevents water leaks: If the gaps are too large, rain and moisture can easily seep into the car, causing water damage to the interior.
- Prevents Increased noise: Larger gaps allow more external noise to enter the cabin, making the ride less comfortable.
- Prevent Drafts and temperature fluctuations: Poor seals can lead to drafts entering the car, making it difficult to maintain a desired temperature.
- Impact Resistance & Vibration Dampening – Reduces the effects of vibrations and absorbs shocks to prevent small amount of damage during door impact.

Automobile flex when going over bumps, and vibrations cause relative motions between the relatively fixed body and movable parts like doors, windows, and sunroofs. This movement could allow water in the vehicle so the weatherstrip must compensate by filling the gap. Furthermore, this relative movement can cause noises such as squeaks, rattles, and creaks to be heard within the vehicle.

Considering a standard four-door vehicle, the doors require 20 feet (6.1 meters) or more of material per door, windows require upwards of 10 feet (3.0 meters), and trunks require large amounts.

Automotive weatherstripping can fail because of age or use. Poorly performing weatherstripping should be reported to the car dealership if the vehicle is under warranty, as fixes may be known.

== Buildings ==
=== Overview ===
Weatherstripping around openings – especially doors and windows – is used in buildings to keep out weather, increase interior comfort, lower utility bills, and reduce noise. Builder weatherstripping can be made from felt; vinyl, rubber, or poly foam; EPDM cellular rubber and vinyl tubing; and metals such as brass and aluminum.

=== Windows ===
Proper application of caulk or weatherstripping around window frames helps seal gaps and prevent leaks after rain. Metal caps on the window top and on sashes redirect rain to drip off instead of infiltrating. Foam or gasket weatherstripping can be applied to the sides and sashes.
