= National Organization for Racing Radio Controlled Autos =

National Organization for Racing Radio Controlled Autos (NORRCA) was one of two premier sanctioning bodies for radio-controlled racing in North America along with Remotely Operated Auto Racers (ROAR) and at the time, the largest boasting of 14,000 members according to the Los Angeles Times in 1994, despite a decline in participation by 40%. In 2002, The New York Times claimed membership at 17,000.

The sanctioning body was established in September 1987 by J. R. Sitman of California, who created the organization with the emphasis on the racers as in contrast to the well-off equipment manufacturers; unlike ROAR, NORRCA also organized races. ROAR members were offered first-year discount membership.

NORRCA was known for many innovations brought into racing such as its creation of racing classes that kept professional drivers away from the less well-off amateur racers and introduced tire limits at major events to keep costs down. Despite its national championship being not as prestigious as that of ROAR's, largely as the latter is an International Federation of Model Auto Racing (IFMAR) member bloc, which earns entry rights to its World Championships, major factory teams compete in both regardless.
