= Associated RC12 =

Team Associated RC12 is an electric 1/12 scale Radio Control vehicle made by Associated Electrics. The car was debuted in 1978 and has won many IFMAR world championships and Remotely Operated Auto Racers US national championships.

== Versions ==
- RC12E - 1978
- RC12i- 1983
- RC12L- 1986
- RC12LW Graphite- 1991
- RC12LS with Dynamic Strut front suspension - 1993
- RC12LC- 1996
- RC12L3- 1998
- RC12L3O- 1999
- RC12L4- 2004
- RC12R5- 2008
- RC12R5.1- 2009
- RC12R5.2 - 2012
- RC12R6 - 2017
