= Yokomo =

Radio controlled cars

Yokomo Co. Ltd.
- Modified version of the 1995 logo
- Native name: ヨコモ
- Formerly: Yokobori Model
- Type: Private
- Industry: Research and Development, Manufacturing, Sales and Promotion
- Founded: 1 May 1965
- Founder: Tomoaki Yokobori
- Headquarters: Adachi, Tokyo, Japan
- Key people: Shigeki Suzuki _{(president)}
- Products: Radio control model cars and components
- Revenue: 193 million yen (2019)
- Net income: 27 million yen (2019)
- Total assets: 1334 million yen (2019)
- Number of employees: 30–50 (2014)
- Website: teamyokomo.com

Former logo (1977–2005)

Yokomo Co. Ltd. (株式会社 ヨコモ, Kabushiki-gaisha Yokomo) is a Japanese company from Adachi, Tokyo that specialize in radio-controlled cars, it was one of the first manufacturers in Japan to build their own RC cars, sell upgrade parts and it also invented the option RTR (Ready To Run) cars, but most notable of all is their long-running "Dog Fighter" series of radio controlled buggies, and ultimately a strong entry on Drift RC Cars mainly through its successes in racing.

== History ==
Tomoaki "Tom" Yokobori (横堀モケイ, Yokobori Tom; 横堀智昭), as a child, was interested in building model warships and aircraft but became interested in radio-control models when he witnessed people playing with radio-controlled aircraft across the Arakawa River, thus he used monthly tuition money intended for cram school to buy himself an aircraft to participate in the hobby.

As his father was an enthusiast of education, Yokobori Jr. regularly attended the home of a United States Army officer to practice his English conversation skills. After graduation from high school, he resisted his father's persuasion to enter college education in favor of starting his mail order scale model retail business, which thrived as model stores was solely available at metropolitan areas.

His sister, who had good English skill, helped him with the logistics of goods overseas when business grew. His parents, who ran a confectionery material business, later agreed to help out with the business. Yokobori branched out into his own store, Yokobori Model Shop (横堀モケイはメーカー, Yokobori Mokei Wamēkā).

In 1970, the company would become involved with another US RC car manufacturer, when they imported the RC-1, produced by Associated Electrics, into Japan. As a result, they became involved in the production side of the market, when they manufactured option parts for the car. This was the start of its partnership with Associated which continued to this day.

In 1974, Yokobori introduce on sales at a Mitsuboshi store in Nihonbashi, the first radio-controlled specialty store incorporated in a department store. As a result, the business increased twofold and then with this opened another store at Ginza.Yokobori branched out into R/C car production in 1977 when the shop built a ready to run version of Cox's 049 Dune Buggy, which was sold as a kit. The car became a success and helped to introduced radio controlled cars into Japan.

The company, who rename Yokomo, a portmanteau of Yokobori Mokei; soon began producing its own competition RC cars in 1977 with the Mini Racer RC-12 and a year later the Mini Racer RC-12 Jr and the Mini Racer RC-12 Jr USA version all for less than 13,000 yen of that time, using bodies Porsche 917/30KL body, that was later formed the basis of the company's Can-Am car styled logo.

In 1979 they offered the imported kit Team Associated RC12E as top model on inventory but with a difference that the all optional parts on the AE Kit, came as common on the Yokomo's version for only 20,000 yen.

Its biggest break was in 1983, when it introduced the YZ-834B, the first of the long-running "Dog Fighter" series of 1:10 off-road buggies.

The car was imported into West Germany by Graupner and was marketed as a Graupner Dog Fighter. Although criticized for having ground clearance that was considered to be too low for a typical off-road course, it wasn't until 1985, when Gil Losi, Jr. used the car to score his and the company's first IFMAR title for the inaugural 1:10 Off-Road World Championship 4WD title.

The car was replaced by the YZ-870C, known as the "Super Dog Fighter", jointly developed by Masami Hirosaka, who was brought into the company following his victory at the following IFMAR 1:10 Off-Road 4WD event. His involvement was rewarded, when he successfully defended his crown in 1989. To this date, with the exception of his first title, won driving a Schumacher CAT, all other IFMAR titles he won have been either for Yokomo (six) and its partner for the Japanese market, Team Associated (eight) and still win national titles for the company. Masami's father, Masaaki was an employee for the company.

Yokomo are also known for the YR-F2 chassis line. Despite being a full-time front-wheel drive RC, the YR-F2 is banned from certain racetracks as it was too fast for other RC's.

In 2003, Yokomo broke the R/C car mould further, when they introduced radio-controlled drifting with a series of cars that was built especially for drifting. Yokomo recently partnered with Tomy in 2008, releasing a series of miniature R/C cars based on its licensed D1GP and drifting cars similar to its R/C line.

Following the decision of Yokobori to retire, Shigeki Suzuki was appointed to replace him as the CEO, effective from October 1, 2019.

== See also ==
- YZ-834B
- Mini Racer RC-12
