= Schumacher Racing Products =

Manufacturer of performance radio-controlled cars

- Company type: Private Limited Company (Ltd.)
- Industry: Racing
- Founded: 1980
- Headquarters: Northampton, England
- Key people: Cecil Schumacher; Robin Schumacher; Phil Booth; Brian P. Vogt
- Products: Radio-controlled cars
- Number of employees: 30
- Website: www.racing-cars.com

Schumacher Racing Products is a British manufacturer of radio-controlled cars and accessories.

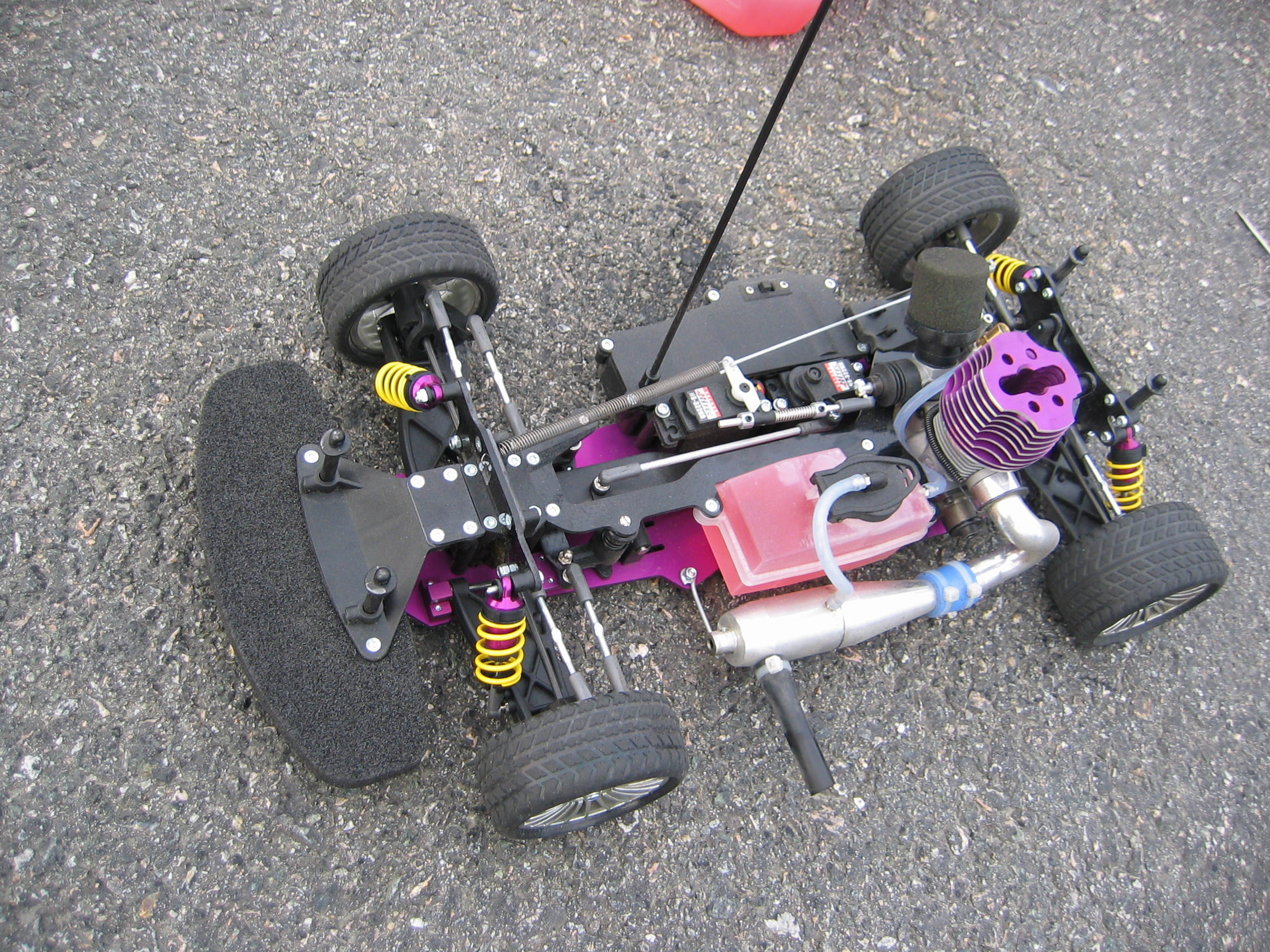
Stock Schumacher Menace GTR with body off.

== History ==
The founder, Cecil Schumacher, was a Cosworth transmission engineer who was recruited from Borg Warner to lead the design team to adapt the Hobbs transmission (which he had worked on) to handle the Cosworth DFV's power. Cecil spotted his workmates driving radio-controlled cars on the company's helipad. He soon started noticing different ways these early primitive cars could be improved he introduced the ball differential to radio-controlled cars.

In 1981 Schumacher Racing Products was formed in Northampton, England, after a local model shop requested the ball differentials used by Cecil's son Robin and his friends. Schumacher soon started selling internationally. Cecil Schumacher's son Robin Schumacher took over the business in 2001.

=== 1980s ===
The first car to be produced by Schumacher was the XL Lexan chassis pan car in 1981 which had highly flexible chassis suitable for indoor racing. This was followed in 1983 by the "C" car which was made out of fibreglass reinforced epoxy resin sheet and designed specifically for racing on carpet. It included many features that are still around on every modern 1/12-scale car; race wins include the euros in 1985 and 1988.

In the latter half of the 1980s, off-road RC cars increased in popularity. In 1986 the first 4WD 1/10-scale off-road buggy was launched, called the SWB CAT. This launched the CAT (Competition All Terrain) brand for Schumacher. This first variant SWB (Standard Wheel Base) 4WD car was an instant success with its winning the 1987 IFMAR off-road RC World Championships with Masami Hirosaka who was lent a works car after Schumacher scouts noted his driving form during practice sessions.

=== 1990s ===
Following the success of the first generation of off-road CATs, Schumacher continued to produce many successful off and on-road electric competition cars. The popularity of the touring car class seriously affected the off-road worlds during the 1990s leading to a shift in focus. Schumacher was then starting to dominate a niche in the "fun" car sector, with high-power/speed nitro-powered models capable of real speeds in excess of 80mph.

=== 2000s ===
Over the turn of this century the Schumacher product line-up became quite familiar with the "fun" cars with increasing number of nitro products; however it remained in the 1/10 competition touring cars market.

=== 2010s ===
The flood of cheap high-volume, low-margin ready to run cars produced in Asia meant the company no longer produce a nitro car or fun car. Schumacher now concentrate on the high level 1/10-scale electrical competitive market. Alongside their Mi touring car range the company re-entered the off-road scene with the CAT SX (4WD) and Cougar SV (2WD). Vintage racing of older designed cars became popular with Schumacher re-releasing the CAT XLS in 2017 and then the Top Cat. In the mid 2010s a move was made to help the sport grow with the introduction of a number of lower priced competition cars. The Mi1 touring car was introduced alongside the ever evolving top spec version. And then a move was made to re-establish 1/12th electric carpet racing with the launch of the Supastock and Eclipse range. It also increased its distrution business of other none competing RC products.

=== 2020s ===
In January 2020 Schumacher won IFMAR 1/12 World Championships held in Milton Keynes. The CAT range changed from belt drive to a shaft drive system in 2026 with the PB named after Phil Booth a former key member of staff.

== Racing Success ==
=== IFMAR World Championships ===
Year	Title	Driver	Model	Reference	Report
1987	1:10 4WD Off-Road	Masami Hirosaka (JPN)	CAT XL		
2020	1:12 Elec. Track	Marc Rheinard (GER)	Eclipse 3		
2020	1:12 Elec. Track	Andy Murray (GBR)	Eclipse 3		
2025	1:10 2WD Off-Road	Broc Champlin (USA)	Schumacher LD3		

=== European Championships ===
Year	Title	Driver	Model	Ref.	Report
1985	1:12	Andy Dobson			
1988	1:12	Phil Davies			
1995	1:10 4WD	Craig Drescher			

=== ROAR National Championships ===
Year	Title	Driver	Model	Ref.	Report
1987	1:10 4WD Off-Road	(United States) Jim Dieter	"Dieter" CAT		
1995	1:10 4WD Off-Road	(United States) Brad Reelfs	CAT 2000 EC		

== Competition cars ==
=== 1/10-scale 4WD off-road buggies ===
Date	Name	Kit	Ref.
2026	CAT PB	K222 Mod; K223 Dirt	
2022	CAT L1R	K201	
2019	CAT L1 Evo	K183	
2018	CAT L1	K176	
2015	CAT K2	K159 Kit; K169 Assembled	
2013	CAT K1 Aero	K147 Kit; K149 Assembled	
2012	CAT K1	K135 Pro K1 Kit; K136 Pro K1 Assembled	
2011	CAT SX3	K119 Pro C/F Kit; K120 Pro C/F Assembled K121 S1 Kit; K122 S1 Assembled	
2009	CAT SX2	K101 – Pro C/F Kit; K102 – Pro CF Assembled; K103 – S1 Kit; K104 – S1 Assembled	
2008	CAT SX	K078 (4–2) NI-MH Kit; K079 Stick LiPo Kit; K091 LiPo Phil Booth Signature; K092 LiPo S1 Composite Assembled	
2005	CAT 4000	Not Produced	
2002	CAT 3000 Evo	KO19X	
2000	CAT 3000	KO19X	
1997	CAT 98	U421D	
1997	CAT 2000SE	U408M	
1995	CAT 2000EC	U498Y; U401F ECS No Slipper	
1993	CAT 2000	U460M	
1993	Bosscat	U455H Works; U444W Sports; U440S Competition	
1992	Procat SE	U427F	
1989	Procat	U409N	
1989	CAT XLS	T403	
1987	CAT XL 4wd	T401	
1986	CAT SWB	T400	

=== 1/10-scale 2WD off-road buggies ===
Date	Name	Kit	Ref.
2023	Cougar LD3	K208 Mod; K210 Stock	
2021	Cougar LD2	K190 Kit; K191 Kit Stock	
2019	Cougar Laydown	K180 Kit	
2017	Cougar KC	K170 Kit	
2017	Cougar KD	K170 Kit	
2015–2019	Cougar KF2	K155 Kit; K156 Assembled	
2013–2015	Cougar KF		
2013	Cougar KR		
2012–2013	Cougar SVR	K133 Kit; K134 Assembled	
2012	Cougar SV2	K123 Kit; K124 Assembled	
2010–2012	Cougar SV	K111 Pro CF – Kit; K112 Pro CF – Assembled; K113 Race S1 – Kit; K114 Race S1 – Assembled	
2002	Fireblade EVO Mk.2	KO15T	
1999	Fireblade EVO Mk.1	KO15T	
1998	Fireblade USA	U424G	
1997	Fireblade 2000	U407L	
1995	Club10 Mk 2 Cougar	U441T	
1993	Cougar 2000	U499Z - 95 Team; U474A - 95 spec U457J - 94 spec U457J - Launch	
1992	Cougar 2 Works	U452E; U453F	
1992	Cougar Club 10	U441T	
1991	Cougar 2	U430I Racing; U429H Sport; U431J Team	
1990	Cougar	U415T	
1988	Topcat	U404J	
1987	CAT XL 2wd	T402	

=== 1/10 4WD electric touring car ===
Date	Name	Kit	Ref.
2022	Mi8	K196 Alloy; K195 Carbon	
2019	Mi7		
2018	Mi6evo		
2014	Mi5Evo	K150 – Pro C/F Assembled; K148 – Pro C/F Kit	
2013	Mi1v2	K151 – Kit; K152 – Assembled	
2013	Mi5	K137 – Pro C/F Kit; K138 – Pro C/F Assembled	
2012–2013	Mi4CXL	K127 – Pro C/F Kit; K128 – Pro C/F Assembled	
2011–2012	Mi4CX	K117 – Pro C/F Kit; K118 – Pro C/F Assembled	
2010–2013	Mi1	K115 Kit; K116 Assembled	
	Mi4LP	K107 – Mi4LP Pro CF Kit; K109 – Mi4LP Pro CF Assembled; K108 – Mi4LP Race S1 Kit; K110 – Mi4LP Race S1 Assembled	-
	Mi4	k094 Pro-CF – Assembled k093 Pro-CF – Kit	
2008	Mi3.5	K082 – Race-S1; K081 – Pro-CF – Trg 5 Cell; K080 – Pro-CF – Trg 6 cell	
2007	Mi3	K073 Mi-3 Pro	
2005–2008	Mi2 EC	K058 – Touring; K059 – USA Foam Spec	
2004	Mi2	K046 Mi-2 S1; K047 Carbon	
2003	Mission	Mission S1 K026; Mission Carbon K?	
1999–2001	SST 99 Pro		
Approx 1997	SST2000		
	SST Sport	SST Sport Lancer EVO 6 SST Sport Volvo S40; SST Subaru WRC	
	SST Axis 2		
	SST Axis		
	Cat 2000 Touring	Escort Cosworth; Alfa Romeo 155; Opel Calibra; Mercedes C-Class; Ford Mondeo	
1995	Bosscat Touring	U473Z – Escort Cosworth; U483J – Alfa Romeo 155; U484K – Opel Calibra; U485L – Mercedes C-Class; U486M – Ford Mondeo	
	Wildcat Touring	Escort Cosworth; Alfa Romeo 155; Opel Calibra; Mercedes C-Class; Ford Mondeo	

=== 1/12 2WD Electric Pan Car ===
Date	Name	Kit	Ref.
2023	Eclipse 5	K203	
	Eclipse 4		
2019	Eclipse 3		
2019	Eclipse 2	K177	
2016–2018	Eclipse	K169	
1988–1990	C-Car SPC	C204	
1983–1988	C-Car	C200; C204 Euro Spec	
1984	B-Car		
1981	XL Lexan Pan Car		

=== 1/12 GT12 circuit and 1/12 oval ===
Date	Name	Kit and launch	Details
2012–2014	SupaStox	K131 – Four-cell NiMh/1S Lipo; K132 – 6 cell NiMh/2S Saddle; K141 – 1S Hotrod Oval Body; K142 – 2S Saloonstox body	
2014 Nov	SupaStox GT	K154 – S1/Diff; K157 – C/F	
2016-2019	SupaStox ATOM	K163 – Sport; K164 – Pro	
2019	ATOM 2	K179 S2 GT12 Kit Alloy; K184 S2 GT12 Kit Carbon Fibre	
2023	ATOM 3	K207 S2 GT12 Kit Alloy; K202 S2 GT12 Kit Carbon Fibre	

=== Formula 1 RC ===
Date	Name	Kit and launch	Details
2020s	Icon 2	K197	
	Icon		

== Other Cars ==
Date	Scale 1/10	Power Electric	Drive FWD/4WD	Type Touring Car	Name Mission FT	Kit K187	Notes Schumachers first front wheel drive touring car.
2010	1/10th	Nitro	4WD	Fun Touring Car	Fusion 28 Turbo	K106 – Red/Silver – RTR; K105 – Blue/Silver – RTR	
2008	1/8th	Electric	4WD	Touring Car	Menace GTRe		
2005	1/8th	Nitro	4WD	Touring Car	Menace GTR		
2004	1/10th	Nitro	4WD	Fun Touring Car	Fusion R12	K037 R12 Team Spec – K042	The Fusion R12 is developed from the SST Mission electric car
2002	1/10th	Nitro	4WD	Fun Touring Car	Fusion 21	K028 + BMW 3 Touring Body; K029 + Subaru Rally Body; K030 + F155 Truck Body; K033 RTR + BMW 3 Touring Body; K034 RTR + Subaru Rally Body; K035 RTR + F155 Truck Body; K050 + Skyline Body; K051 RTR + Skyline Body	
2000s	1/6 th	Electric	2WD	Track Car	Big 6 Lotus Elise Sport	S996	
2000s	1/6 th	Nitro	2WD	Track Car	Big 6 Lotus Elise Sport	S1020	
1995	1/10th	Electric	2wd	Touring Car	Club10 mk.2	U439R – Cosworth Touring; U475B – Alfa Romeo 155 Touring; U476C – Opel Calibra Touring; U477D – Mercedes C-Class; U478E – Ford Mondeo Touring	
1995	1/10th	Electric	2wd	Touring Car	911 turbo SE		Based on the Cougar mk1
1992		Nitro		Pan Car	Daytona		
1990s and 2000s	N/A	Electric	2WD	Fun Car	WILDCAT		
1992	1/10th	Nitro	2WD	Pan Car	Daytona		
1990s	1/10th	Electric	4WD	Rallycross	RS 4x4		Based on the Procat
1995	1/10th	Electric	2WD	Offroad Truck	Club 10 mk.2 Storm truck	U443V	Cougar Mk2 based
1991	1/10th	Electric	2WD	Offroad Truck	Shotgun truck	U419X	Cougar based
	1/10th	Nitro	4WD	Fun Touring Car	Fusion 28	K077 Skyline; Red/Silver – RTR; K083 ARR – No Body; K084 No Body – RTR; K075 Skyline; Blue-Silver – RTR	
		Nitro	Truck		Riot 2		
		Nitro	Truck		Riot	S1174	
	1/10th	Nitro	2WD	Truck	Nitro 10	190 Evaluation; 911 Sport	Based on the Club 10
	1/16th	Nitro	2WD	Micro Truck	Rascal 2		
	1/10th	Nitro		rear wheel drive stadium truck	Nitro 21 XT-R 3E		
		Nitro		Offroad Buggy	Storm 2000		
		Nitro		Offroad Buggy	Nitro 10 Panther		
		Nitro		Offroad Monster Truck	Nitro 10 Racing Truck		
		Nitro		Offroad Monster Truck	Menace		
	1/8th	Nitro	4WD	Offroad Buggy	Swift		
	1/8th	Nitro	4WD	Offroad Buggy	Swift 2		
	1/8th	Twin Nitro	4WD	Monster Truck	Manic		
	1/8th	Nitro	2WD	Stunt Truck	Havoc		
	1/10th	Electric	2WD	Touring Car	Alfa Romeo 155	U492S – Alfa Romeo 155 Touring	Wildcat Chassis
