= List of Tamiya product lines =

Over the years, the Tamiya Corporation has created a huge number of notable product lines. This article attempts to list them.

== Scale models ==
Tamiya began creating wooden kits for educational purpose already in 1948. In 1960, Tamiya released its first plastic kit, which was the famous IJN Yamato battleship in 1/800 scale. Tamiya has since then become known for precise craft sets with impressive quality and attention to detail. Tamiya held an arguable lead in the static plastic model market for many years and competed with other classic brands like Revell and Airfix, but recently Chinese makers such as Dragon, Meng and Trumpeter are offering fierce competition.

Over time kit numbers have been changed and updated but are now organized in the following system:

- 12001–12057: 1/12 Big scale racing car series
- 14001–14142: 1/12 Motorcycles
- 16001–16042: 1/6 Big scale motorcycles series
- 20001–20071: 1/20 Grand Prix collection
- 24001–24364: 1/24 Sport cars series
- 25201–25217: Limited special editions
- 28501–28502: 1/35 Dinosaurs
- 31001–31911: 1/700 Waterline (I)
- 32501–32605: 1/48 Military miniatures series
- 35001–35392: 1/35 Military miniatures series
- 36201–36213: 1/16 Big tank series
- 36301–36316: 1/16 World figure series
- 60301–60328: 1/32 Aircraft
- 60101–60204: 1/35 Dinosaur models
- 60401–60402: 1/100 Space Shuttle orbiter series
- 60701–60793: 1/72 Warbird collection
- 61001–61126: 1/48 Aircraft
- 61601–61610: 1/100 Combat plane series
- 77501–77525: 1/700 Waterline (II)
- 78001–78032: 1/350 Ships

== Military models ==
=== 1/35 military miniatures series ===
The oldest category in Tamiya's export line has been the "Military Miniatures" series of 1:35 scale figures and vehicles. The series has focused on World War II military subjects, though a growing minority of kits in this line come from later periods. The collection of German vehicles is especially strong.

The products are characterized by striking full colour paintings on the boxtops. Tamiya moulds are generally quite clean and almost no flash is found on their products. It was Tamiya themselves that established the use of 1/35 scale for military models. The scale was the result of the design of their first tank kit, the motorized Panther tank, being designed just large enough to contain the motor assembly and battery pack.

In addition to vehicles themselves the category includes soldiers, weapons sets and scenery items (e.g., brick walls, signs, barricades) for use in dioramas.

In the 1990s Dragon (DML) kits used to be generally inferior to Tamiya. Dragon's quality has improved and they have elected to compete in the high quality end of the market offering photo etched parts, aluminum barrels, individual track links, and upwards of 500 parts. Another Chinese maker, Trumpeter is also competing from lower end of the market. Tamiya's kits use vinyl tracks but Tamiya's recent inclusion of two kinds of tracks (vinyl and molded plastic) suggest that Tamiya is following the trend set by other manufacturers. As Trumpeter's quality improves, Tamiya's static military lines are being pressured from both the high end and the low end.

In the traditional 1/35 scale military miniature market Tamiya continues to introduce innovations, such as suspensions that articulate using real springs. However these features are not substantial or unique enough to restore the clear dominance Tamiya once held in static miniatures. Many Chinese model makers also release numerous outstanding kits each year, which puts pressure on Tamiya’s static 1/35 line. Where Tamiya still holds an edge is in its visibility as a market leader, which allows it to champion obscure vehicles that no other maker is willing to build. The Sturmtiger 38 cm, of which only a handful of the massive mortar tanks were built in real life, is one example. The Char B is another: numerous and powerful, but not a glamorous tank, and one no other major maker was willing to invest in. By supporting these lesser-known subjects, Tamiya maintains a wide-ranging product line and remains a leading name in the market.

List of all Tamiya 1/35 Military miniatures
Kit number	Model	Release year	In production	Comment
35001	German Army Tank Crew (3 figures)	1968	No	New tool
35002	German Army Infantry (4 figures)	1970	No	New tool
35003	German Schwimmwagen (Kfz. 1/20 K2s) (3 figures)	1970	No	New tool
35004	U.S. Tank Crew (4 figures)	1970	No	New tool
35005	British Army 6pounder Anti-Tank Gun (3 figures)	1970	No	New tool
35006	German Kübelwagen Pkw. K1 (type 82) (3 figures)	1970	No	New tool
35007	British Army Infantry (3 figures)	1970	No	New tool
35008	German Africa Korps Infantry (4 figures)	1971	No	New tool
35009	German Panzerkampfwagen II Ausf. F/G (5 figures)	1971	Yes	Contains 35008
35010	German Army Officer (4 figures)	1971	No	New tool
35011	German Panzerkampfwagen III Ausf. M/N (5 figures)	1971	No	Contains 35010
35012	German Parachuter (4 figures)	1971	No	New tool
35013	U.S. Army Infantry (4 figures)	1972	Yes	New tool
35014	German Sturmgeschütz III Ausf.G (5 figures)	1972	No	Contains 35012
35015	U.S.Jeep 1/4 ton 4x4 truck Willys MB (3 figures)	1972	No	New tool
35016	German Motorcycle BMW R75 with Side Car (4 figures)	1972	No	New tool
35017	German 88mm Gun Flak 36/37 (9 figures)	1972	Yes	New tool
35018	British Scout Car Daimler Mk.II (3 figures)	1972	No	New tool
35019	German Army Tank Crew (4 figures)	1972	No	Rebox from 35001 + 1 figure
35020	German Hanomag Sd.Kfz. 251/1 (5 figures)	1973	Yes	New tool
35021	Russian Field Car GAZ67B (3 figures)	1973	No	New tool
35022	Russian Infantry (4 figures)	1973	No	New tool
35023	German Motorcycle Zündapp KS750 & BMW R75 (2 figures)	1973	No	New tool
35024	British Infantry Tank Mk.II Matilda (1 figure)	1973	No	New tool
35025	Sand Bags Set	1973	Yes	New tool
35026	Jerry Cans Set	1973	Yes	New tool
35027	Barricade Set	1973	Yes	New tool
35028	Brick Wall Set	1973	Yes	New tool
35029	German Sd.Kfz2 Kleines Kettenkraftrad (3 figures)	1973	No	New tool
35030	German Assault Troops (Infantry) (8 figures)	1974	Yes	New tool
35031	German Artillery Troops (8 figures)	1973	No	Rebox of figures from 35017
35032	British Eight Army Infantry Desert Rats (8 figures)	1972	No	New tool
35033	British Special Air Service Jeep (2 figures)	1974	No	Rebox from 35015 with new parts
35034	Italian Carro Armato M13/40 (1 figure)	1974	No	New tool
35035	German PAK 35/36 3.7 cm Anti-Tank Gun (4 figures)	1973	Yes	New tool
35036	German Schwerer Panzerspähwagen (8-Rad) Sd.Kfz. 232 (1 figure)	1974	No	New tool
35037	D.A.K German Africa Corps (8 figures)	1974	No	New tool
35038	German Machine Gun Troops Infantry (7 figures)	1974	Yes	New tool
35039	U.S. Medium Tank M3 Lee Mk I (1 figure)	1974	No	New tool
35040	M113 U.S. Armoured Personnel Carrier (5 figures)	1974	Yes	New tool
35041	British Army Medium Tank M3 Grant Mk I (1 figure)	1974	No	Rebox from 35039 with new parts
35042	U.S. Light Tank M3 Stuart (1 figure)	1974	No	New tool
35043	Ford G.P.A. Jeep U.S. Amphibian ¼ ton 4x4 Truck (2 figures)	1974	No	New tool
35044	British 25Pdr. Field Gun & Quad Gun Tractor Canadian Ford (1 figure)	1974	Yes	Contains 35045, and 35046 without the figures
35045	British Quad Gun Tractor Canadian Ford F.G.T. (1 figure)	1974	No	New tool
35046	British 25Pdr. Field Gun (6 figures)	1974	No	New tool
35047	German 7.5 cm Anti-Tank Gun (Pak40/L46) (3 figures)	1975	Yes	New tool
35048	U.S. Infantry (West European Theater) (8 figures)	1974	Yes	New tool
35049	Russian Tank T-34/76 1942 Production Model (2 figures)	1975	No	New tool
35050	German 8 ton Semi Track 20mm Flakvierling Sd.kfz 7/1 (5 figures)	1975	Yes	New tool
35051	German Sd.kfz 222 Leichter Panzerspähwagen 4/4 (1 figure)	1975	No	New tool
35052	German S.GL. Einheits PKW Horch 4X4 Type 1a (1 figure)	1975	Yes	New tool
35053	German Wehrmacht Mounted Infantry Set (2 figures, 1 horse)	1975	Yes	New tool
35054	German Panzerkampfwagen IV Ausf.H (1 figure)	1975	No	New tool
35055	U.S. Tank M41 Walker Bulldog (3 figures)	1975	Yes	Rebox from 1969
35056	German Tiger I Panzerkampfwagen VI (Sd.Kfz.181) Ausf. E (2 figures)	1975	No	Rebox from 1970
35057	German King Tiger Panzerkampfwagen VI Tiger II "Konigs Tiger" (Sd.Kfz. 182) (2 figures)	1975	No	Rebox from 1967
35058	German Hunting Tiger Jagd Panzer PzJg VI Jagt Tiger (Sd.Kfz 186s) (2 figures)	1975	No	Rebox from 1967
35059	Russian Tank T34/76 1943 Production Model (2 figures)	1975	Yes	Rebox from 35049 with new parts
35060	German Tank Destroyer Marder II (2 figures)	1971	No	New tool
35061	German Panzer Grenadiers Set (8 figures)	1975	Yes	New tool
35062	German Sd.Kfz.223 Leichter Panzerspähwagen (Fu) (2 figures)	1975	No	New tool
35063	Russian Heavy Tank KV-II GIGANT (1 figure)	1975	No	New tool
35064	West German Army Medium Tank Kampfpanzer Leopard (1 figure)	1975	Yes	New tool
35065	German Panzerkampfwagen V Panther (Sd.kfz.171) Ausf.A (2 figures)	1968	Yes	Rebox from 1969
35066	Russian Heavy Tank KV-I Type C (1 figure)	1975	No	Rebox from 35063 with new parts
35067	Road Sign Set	1975	No	New tool
35068	British Army Chieftain Mk.5 (3 figures)	1975	Yes	New tool
35069	German Jagdpanzer V Jagdpanther (Sd.Kfz. 173s) (1 figure)	1975	No	New tool
35070	U.S. Armoured Personnel Carrier M3A2 Half Track (9 figures)	1975	No	New tool
35071	U.S. Armoured Command Post Car M577 (5 figures)	1974	No	Rebox from 35040 with new parts
35072	Russian Tank Destroyer SU-85 (1 figure)	1975	No	New tool
35073	German Observation Group (8 figures)	1975	No	New tool
35074	German Tent Set (1 figure)	1975	Yes	New tool
35075	Japanese Medium Tank Type 97 Chi-Ha (2 figures)	1975	Yes	New tool
35076	British S.A.S. Land Rover Pink Panther (1 figure)	1976	No	New tool
35077	German Sturmpanzer IV Brummbär (Sd.Kfz 166) (2 figures)	1976	No	New tool
35078	Italian Semovente M40-75/18 (2 figures)	1975	No	New tool
35079	U.S. Command Figure Set (4 figures)	1976	No	New tool
35080	U.S. Combat Group Set (8 figures)	1976	No	Rebox of figures from 35070
35081	U.S. Multiple Gun Motor Carriage M16 (3 figures)	1976	No	New tool
35082	British Ambulance Rover 7 (5 figures)	1976	No	Rebox from 35076 with new parts
35083	U.S. Half Track 81mm Mortar Carrier M21 (4 figures)	1976	No	Rebox from 35070 with new parts
35084	U.S. Military Police Set (2 figures)	1976	No	New tool
35085	German Flakpanzer IV Wirbelwind (4 figures)	1976	No	New tool
35086	U.S. Gun & Mortar Team Set (8 figures)	1976	Yes	New tool
35087	German Sturmgeschütz IV (SdKfz 163) (1 figure)	1976	Yes	New tool
35088	German Jagdpanzer IV/L 70 Lang (1 figure)	1976	No	New tool
35089	British Universal Carrier Mk.II (2 figures)	1976	No	New tool
35090	Japanese Army Infantry (4 figures)	1976	Yes	New tool
35091	German 20mm Flakvierling 38 mit Sd.Ah. 52	1977	Yes	New tool
35092	British L.R.D.G. Command Car 30cwt Truck (2 figures)	1976	No	New tool
35093	Russian Tank Destroyer SU-122 (1 figure)	1976	No	New tool
35094	German Flak Crew (5 figures)	1977	No	Rebox of figures from 35050
35095	Japan Type1 75mm Self Propelled Gun (2 figures)	1977	No	New tool
35096	German Panzerkampfwagen IV Ausf. D (3 figures)	1977	Yes	Rebox from 35054 with new parts
35097	U.S. Light Tank M5A1 (1 figure)	1977	No	New tool
35098	West German I.C.V. Schützenpanzer Marder (2 figures)	1977	No	New tool
35099	West German Anti Aircraft Tank Flakpanzer Gepard (1 figure)	1977	Yes	New tool
35100	British Churchill Crocodile (2 figures)	1977	No	New tool
35101	German Flakpanzer IV Möbelwagen (4 figures)	1977	No	New tool
35102	German 20mm FlaK38 mit Sd.Ah.51	1978	No	New tool
35103	German Field Kitchen Gulaschkanone (1 figure, 2 horses)	1978	Yes	New tool
35104	German 6X4 Truck Krupp Protze (1 figure)	1978	No	New tool
35105	German Horch 1a with 2 cm Flak 38 (5 figures)	1976	No	Contains 35052 + 35102 + 35109
35106	British Stretcher Party (4 figures)	1978	No	Rebox of figures from 35082
35107	M113A1 - Fire Support Vehicle (1 figure)	1979	No	Rebox from 35040 with new parts
35108	Russian T-62A Tank (1 figure)	1979	Yes	New tool
35109	German Soldiers Seated (4 figures)	1978	No	Rebox of figures from 35105
35110	U.S. M8 Howitzer Motor Carriage (1 figure)	1979	No	New tool
35111	German Infantry Weapons Set	1979	Yes	New tool
35112	West German Tank Leopard A4 (1 figure)	1979	Yes	Rebox from 35064 with new parts
35113	German Greif Ausf. A (Sd.Kfz. 250/3) (4 figures)	1979	Yes	New tool
35114	J.G.S.D.F. Type 74 Japanese Tank (1 figure)	1979	No	New tool
35115	German Sd.Kfz. 250/9 Ausf. A 2 cm (1 figure)	1979	No	Rebox from 35113 with new parts
35116	U.S. Armoured SP Mortar M106A1 (3 figures)	1980	No	Rebox from 35040 with new parts
35117	U.S. Armoured Troops (5 figures)	1980	No	New tool
35118	Famous Generals (5 figures)	1975	No	New tool
35119	U.S. 107mm Mortar & Crew (3 figures)	1980	No	New tool
35120	U.S. M48A3 Patton Medium Tank (2 figures)	1981	Yes	New tool
35121	U.S. Infantry Weapons Set	1981	Yes	New tool
35122	U.S. Medium Tank M4A3 Sherman 75mm gun - late model (2 figures)	1981	No	New tool
35123	U.S. M151A2 Ford Mutt (1 figure)	1982	Yes	New tool
35124	U.S. M-1 Abrams Main Battle Tank (1 figure)	1982	No	New tool
35125	U.S. M151A2 w/ TOW Missile Launcher (1 figure)	1983	Yes	Rebox from 35123 with new parts
35126	U.S. Air Defense Gun System M247 Sgt York (1 figure)	1983	No	New tool
35127	Israeli Main Battle Tank Merkava (1 figure)	1983	Yes	New tool
35128	Livestock Set	1984	Yes	New tool
35129	German Soldiers At Rest (4 figures)	1984	Yes	New tool
35130	U.S. M151A2 Ford MUTT with M416 Cargo Trailer (1 figure)	1984	No	Rebox from 35123 with new parts
35131	U.S. M3 Bradley Cavalry Fighting Vehicle (1 figure)	1985	No	New tool
35132	U.S. M2 Bradley Infantry Fighting Vehicle (1 figure)	1985	No	Rebox from 35131 with new parts
35133	U.S. Modern Army Infantry Set (4 figures)	1985	No	New tool
35134	British Main Battle Tank Challenger (1 figure)	1986	No	New tool
35135	U.S. M113 Armoured Cavalry Assault Vehicle (3 figures)	1987	Yes	Rebox from 35040 with new parts
35136	U.S. Marine LVTP7A1 (1 figure)	1987	No	New tool
35137	Japanese Type 97 Shinhoto Chi-Ha Late Version (Improved Turret)	1987	No	Rebox from 35075 with new parts
35138	Russian Medium Tank T-34/85	1987	No	Rebox from 35049 with new parts
35139	U.S. M4A3E2 "Jumbo" Assault tank (2 figures)	1987	No	Rebox from 35122 with new parts
35140	U.S. M60A3 105mm Gun Tank (1 figure)	1988	Yes	Rebox from 1970
35141	U.S. Modern Accessory Set	1988	No	New tool
35142	Russian Tank KV-1B (Model 1940 w/Applique Armor) (1 figure)	1988	No	Rebox from 35063 with new parts
35143	U.S. Hummer with M242 Bushmaster	1989	No	New tool
35144	German 8ton Semi Track 3.7 cm Flak 37 (Sd.Kfz.7/2) Armored Cab Type	1988	Yes	Rebox from 35050 with new parts
35145	German 3.7 cm Flak 37 Anti-Aircraft Gun mit Sd.Ah.52	1989	No	New tool
35146	German Tiger I Pz.Kpfw.VI Ausf.E (Sd.Kfz.181) Late Version (1 figure)	1989	Yes	New tool
35147	German Kanonenwagen Mtl.SPW.(Sd.Kfz.251/9) Ausf.D (7.5 cm KwK 37L/24) (1 figure)	1989	No	New tool
35148	German 8 ton Semi Track (Sd.kfz.7) (8 figures)	1990	No	Rebox from 35050 with new parts
35149	Russian T34/76 "ChTZ" version, 1943 Production (2 figures)	1990	Yes	Rebox from 35049 with new parts
35150	U.S. Navy PBR 31 Mk.II Patrol Boat River "Pibber" (4 figures)	1991	Yes	New tool
35151	German Mtl.SPW.(Sd.Kfz.251/1) Ausf.D Mit Schwerer Wurfrahmen 40 Stuka zu Fuss (4 figures)	1991	No	Rebox from 35147 with new parts
35152	U.S. M2A2 Infantry Fighting Vehicle (1 figure)	1991	No	Rebox from 35131 with new parts
35153	U.S. Modern Military Figures "Desert Scheme" (6 figures)	1991	No	New tool
35154	British Main Battle Tank Challenger 1 (Mk.3) (2 figures)	1992	Yes	Rebox from 35134 with new parts
35155	German Heavy Rocket Launcher Type 41 Schweres Wurfgerät 41 "Heulende Kuh" (2 figures)	1992	No	New tool
35156	U.S. M1A1 Abrams 120mm Gun Main Battle Tank (2 figures)	1992	Yes	Rebox from 35124 with new parts
35157	U.S. Marine M60A1 w/ Reactive Armor (2 figures)	1992	Yes	Rebox from 35140 with new parts
35158	U.S. M1A1 Abrams with Mine Plow (2 figures)	1992	Yes	Rebox from 35124 with new parts
35159	U.S. Marine AAVP7A1 w/UGWS (2 figures)	1992	No	Rebox from 35136 with new parts
35160	Russian Army Tank T-72M1 (1 figure)	1992	Yes	New tool
35161	U.S. Self-Propelled A.A. Gun M42 Duster (3 figures)	1992	Yes	Rebox from 1970
35162	Bundeswehr SPz Marder 1A2 mit Panzerabwehrsystem Milan (2 figures)	1993	No	Rebox from 35098 with new parts
35163	J.G.S.D.F. Type 61 Tank (1 figure)	1993	Yes	Rebox from 1970
35164	German King Tiger Production Turret (1 figure)	1993	Yes	New tool
35165	German King Tiger Separate Track Links	1993	Yes	New tool
35166	King Tiger Brass 88mm Projectiles	1993	Yes	New tool
35167	King Tiger photo-etched grille set	1993	Yes	New tool
35168	J.G.S.D.F. Type 74 Tank Winter Version (2 figures)	1993	Yes	Rebox from 35114 with new parts
35169	German King Tiger Porsche Turret (1 figure)	1993	Yes	Rebox from 35164 with new parts
35170	German Panther Type G Early Version (1 figure)	1993	Yes	New tool
35171	Panther Type G Separate Track links	1994	Yes	New tool
35172	Panther Type G Photo-Etched Grille Set	1994	Yes	New tool
35173	Panther Brass 75mm Projectiles	1994	Yes	New tool
35174	German Panther Type G Steel Wheel Version (1 figure)	1994	No	Rebox from 35170 with new parts
35175	British Universal Carrier Mk.II European Campaign (5 figures)	1994	Yes	Rebox from 35089 with new parts
35176	German Panther Type G Late Version (2 figures)	1994	Yes	Rebox from 35170 with new parts
35177	German Sturmtiger 38 cm Assault Mortar (1 figure)	1989	Yes	New tool
35178	Sturmtiger Aluminum 38 cm Projectiles	1995	No	New tool
35179	Tiger I (Late) Photo-Etched Grille Set	1994	Yes	New tool
35180	German Tank Engine Maintenance Crew Set (2 figures)	1994	Yes	New tool
35181	German Panzerkampfwagen IV Ausf. J / Sd.Kfz. 161/2 (1 figure)	1994	Yes	New tool
35182	Pz.Kpfw. IV Brass 75mm Projectiles (75mm KwK 40 L/48)	1993	Yes	New tool
35183	Pz.Kpfw. IV Photo-Etched Parts Set	1994	No	New tool
35184	German Machine Gun Crew On Maneuver (5 figures)	1994	Yes	New tool
35185	PanzerKampfwagen IV On-Vehicle Equipment Set	1995	Yes	New tool
35186	German Fuel Drum Set	1995	Yes	New tool
35187	Zimmerit Coating Applicator For 1:35 Scale Projects.	1995	Yes	New tool
35188	German Tank Ammo-Loading Crew (4 figures)	1995	Yes	New tool
35189	Tiger I Brass 88mm Projectiles for KwK36/L56 - FlaK 36/37	1995	Yes	New tool
35190	U.S. Medium Tank M4 Sherman Early Production (2 figures)	1995	Yes	Rebox from 35122 with new parts
35191	M4 Sherman Brass 75mm Projectiles	1993	Yes	New tool
35192	U.S. Army Assault Infantry Set (6 figures)	1995	Yes	New tool
35193	German Infantry Mortar Team (4 figures)	1995	Yes	New tool
35194	German Tiger I Mid Production (1 figure)	1995	Yes	Rebox from 35146 with new parts
35195	German Mtl.SPW. (Sd.Kfz.251/1) Ausf.D (3 figures)	1995	Yes	Rebox from 35147 with new parts
35196	German Front-Line Infantrymen (5 figures)	1995	Yes	New tool
35197	German Sturmgeschütz III Ausf.G Fruhe Version (2 figures)	1995	Yes	New tool
35198	StuG III Brass 75mm & 105mm Projectiles	1995	Yes	New tool
35199	StuG III Photo Etched Grille	1995	Yes	New tool
35200	German Self-Propelled Howitzer le FH18/2 auf GWII (Sd.Kfz.124) Wespe (2 figures)	1996	No	New tool
35201	German Tank Crew at Rest (6 figures)	1996	Yes	New tool
35202	German Tiger I Panzerkampfwagen VI (Sd.kfz.181) Ausf. E Mittlere Produktion - Kommandant Otto Carius (1 figure)	1996	No	Rebox from 35146 with new parts
35203	German Jagdpanther (Sd.Kfz 173) Späte Version (1 figure)	1996	Yes	New tool
35204	German Infantry Weapons Set A (Early/Mid WWII)	1996	No	New tool
35205	German Infantry Weapons Set B (Mid/Late WWII)	1996	No	New tool
35206	U.S. Infantry Equipment Set	1996	No	New tool
35207	Russian Army Assault Infantry (12 figures)	1996	Yes	New tool
35208	J.G.S.D.F. Type 90 Tank (2 figures)	1996	Yes	New tool
35209	German Panzerkampfwagen IV Ausf. H (Sd.Kfz. 161/1) Early Version (1 figure)	1996	Yes	Rebox from 35181 with new parts
35210	British Infantry Tank Mk.IV Churchill Mk.VII (3 figures)	1996	Yes	Rebox from 35100 with new parts
35211	Russian Heavy Tank JS3 Stalin (1 figure)	1996	Yes	New tool
35212	German Soldiers at Field Briefing (5 figures)	1996	Yes	New tool
35213	German Kübelwagen Type 82 (1 figure)	1997	Yes	New tool
35214	Russian Army Tank Crew at Rest (6 figures)	1997	No	New tool
35215	German Panzerkampfwagen III Ausf. L (Sd.Kfz. 141/1) (1 figure)	1997	Yes	New tool
35216	German Tiger I Panzerkampfwagen VI Tiger I Ausführung E (Sd.Kfz.181) Frühe Produktion (1 figure)	1997	Yes	Rebox from 35146 with new parts
35217	Tiger I Early Production Photo Etched Grille	1997	Yes	New tool
35218	U.S. 2½-Ton 6×6 Cargo Truck (1 figure)	1997	Yes	New tool
35219	Jeep Willys MB 1/4ton 4X4 Truck (1 figure)	1997	No	New tool
35220	German Kübelwagen Engine Maintenance Set (1 figure)	1997	No	New tool
35221	British Cruiser Tank Mk.VIII, Cromwell Mk.IV, A27M (1 figure)	1997	Yes	New tool
35222	Cromwell Photo-etched Grill Set	1997	Yes	New tool
35223	British Infantry On Patrol (5 figures)	1998	Yes	New tool
35224	German Schwimmwagen Type 166 (1 figure)	1998	Yes	New tool
35225	German Steyr Type 1500A/01 (1 figure)	1998	No	New tool
35226	Steyr Type 1500A Photo-etched Grille Set	1998	No	New tool
35227	German Tiger I Initial Production Ausführung Afrika (1 figure)	1998	Yes	Rebox from 35146 with new parts
35228	U.S. M8 Light Armored Car Greyhound (1 figure)	1998	Yes	New tool
35229	Allied Vehicles Accessory Set	1998	Yes	New tool
35230	Dragon Wagon U.S. 40 Ton Tank Transporter (4 figures)	1998	Yes	New tool
35231	U.S. 2 1/2ton 6x6 Cargo Truck Accessory Parts Set	1998	No	New tool
35232	British Cruiser Tank Mk.VIII A27L Centaur C.S. Mk.IV (2 figures)	1999	No	Rebox from 35221 with new parts
35233	German Flakpanzer IV Wirbelwind (4 figures)	1994	No	Rebox from 35085 with new parts
35234	U.S.M20 Armored Utility Car (2 figures)	1999	No	Rebox from 35228 with new parts
35235	German Steyr Type 1500A Kommandeurwagen (3 figures)	1999	No	Rebox from 35225 with new parts
35236	J.G.S.D.F. Type 90 Tank w/Mine Roller (2 figures)	1999	No	Rebox from 35208 with new parts
35237	German Self Propelled AA Gun Möbelwagen (Sd.Kfz.161/3) (1 figure)	1999	No	Rebox from 35101 with new parts
35238	Kübelwagen Type 82 Africa Corps (1 figure)	1999	Yes	Rebox from 35213 with new parts
35239	German Schwerer Zugkraftwagen 18t (Sd.Kfz.9) Famo (8 figures)	1999	Yes	New tool
35240	German Soldiers with Bicycles (2 figures)	1991	Yes	New tool
35241	German Motorcycle Orderly Set (DKW NZ 350) (2 figures)	1999	Yes	New tool
35242	German Leopard 2 A5 Main Battle Tank (1 figure)	2000	No	New tool
35243	Tank Recovery Accessory Set (For German 18 Ton Half-Track)	2000	No	New tool
35244	U.S. M26 Armored Tank Recovery Vehicle (6 figures)	2000	Yes	Rebox from 35230 with new parts
35245	J.G.S.D.F. Motorcycle Reconnaissance Set (2 figures)	2000	Yes	New tool
35246	German FAMO & Sd.Ah.116 (12 figures)	2000	Yes	Rebox from 35239 with new parts
35247	German Field Kitchen Scenery (4 figures)	2001	Yes	Rebox from 35103 with new parts
35248	German Tank Destroyer Marder III (Sd.Kfz.139) (2 figures)	2001	Yes	New tool
35249	British Universal Carrier Mk.II Forced Reconnaissance (5 figures)	2001	Yes	Rebox from 35089 with new parts
35250	U.S. Medium Tank M4A3 Sherman 75mm Gun (4 figures)	2002	Yes	Rebox from 35122 with new parts
35251	U.S. Medium Tank M4A3 Sherman 105mm Howitzer Assault Support (4 figures)	2002	Yes	Rebox from 35122 with new parts
35252	German King Tiger Ardennes Front (3 figures)	2002	Yes	Rebox from 35164 with new parts
35253	German Panzer Division 'Frontline Reconnaissance Team' (4 figures)	2002	Yes	New tool
35254	U.S. Medium Tank M26 Pershing (T26E3) (2 figures)	2002	Yes	New tool
35255	German Tank Destroyer Marder III Sd.Kfz.138 (1 figure)	2002	No	New tool
35256	German Assault Infantry w/Winter Gear (5 figures)	2002	Yes	New tool
35257	Russian Medium Tank T-55A (1 figure)	2002	Yes	New tool
35258	German Marder III M Brass 7.5 cm Projectiles for PaK 40 & Marder III M	2002	No	New tool
35259	German Krupp Protze 1 ton (6x4) Kfz.69 Towing Truck with 3.7 cm Pak (4 figures)	2002	Yes	Rebox from 35104 and 35035 with new parts
35260	J.G.S.D.F. Type 90 Tank w/Ammo-Loading Crew Set (6 figures)	2000	No	Rebox from 35208 with new parts
35261	German Panther Type G Early Version w/Eduard photo etched parts for Zimmerit coating (1 figure)	2003	No	Rebox from 35170 with new parts
35262	German Panzerkampfwagen IV Ausf. J w/PE Zimmerit (1 figure)	2004	No	Rebox from 35181 with new parts
35263	U.S. M1025 Humvee Armament Carrier (2 figures)	2003	No	New tool
35264	U.S. M2A2 ODS / Infantry Fighting Vehicle (1 figure)	2003	Yes	Rebox from 35131 with new parts
35265	U.S. M113A2 Armored Personnel Carrier Desert Version (2 figures)	2003	Yes	Rebox from 35040 with new parts
35266	Modern U.S. Military Equipment Set	2003	Yes	New tool
35267	U.S. M1046 Humvee TOW Missile Carrier (2 figures)	2003	No	Rebox from 35263 with new parts
35268	German Leichter Panzerspähwagen (Fu) (Sd.Kfz.223) (2 figures)	2003	Yes	Rebox from 35062 with new parts
35269	U.S. M1A2 Abrams Operation Iraqi Freedom (2 figures)	2003	Yes	Rebox from 35124 with new parts
35270	German Leichter Panzerspähwagen (4x4) (Sd.Kfz.222) (1 figure)	2003	Yes	Rebox from 35051 with new parts
35271	German Leopard 2A6 Main Battle Tank (2 figures)	2003	Yes	Rebox from 35242 with new parts
35272	Leopard 2 A5/6 Photo-Etched Parts	2004	Yes	New tool
35273	US M1A1/A2 Abrams Photo-Etched Parts Set	2004	Yes	New tool
35274	British Main Battle Tank Challenger 2 (Desertised) (2 figures)	2004	Yes	New tool
35275	J.G.S.D.F. Light Armored Vehicle Iraq Humanitarian Assistance Unit (1 figure)	2004	No	New tool
35276	J.G.S.D.F. Iraq humanitarian assistance team (5 figures)	2000	Yes	New tool
35277	Challenger 2 Photo-Etched Parts Set	2004	Yes	New tools
35278	J.G.S.D.F. Type 90 Tank Photo-Etched Parts	2004	Yes	New tool
35279	French Main Battle Tank Leclerc Series 2 (1 figure)	2005	No	New tool
35280	Modern French LeClerc 2 PhotoEtched Parts	2005	Yes	New tool
35281	Sturmgeschütz III Ausf. B (Sd.Kfz. 142) (1 figure)	2005	Yes	New tool
35282	French Battle Tank B1 bis (1 figure)	2006	Yes	New tool
35283	German 88mm Gun Flak 36 "North African Campaign" (8 figures)	2006	No	Rebox from 35017 with new parts
35284	French Armored Carrier Renault UE 2 (4 figures)	2007	No	New tool
35285	German Jagdpanzer 38(t) Hetzer Mittlere Produktion (1 figure)	2007	Yes	New tool
35286	German Leichter Panzerspähwagen 4x4 Afrika-Korps (Sd.Kfz. 222) (3 figures)	2007	Yes	Rebox from 35051 with new parts
35287	B1 bis German Army Panzerkampfwagen B-2 740(f) (1 figure)	2007	No	Rebox from 35282 with new parts
35288	French Infantry Set (6 figures)	2007	Yes	New tool
35289	Russian Heavy Tank JS-2 Model 1944 ChKz (2 figures)	2007	Yes	New tool
35290	German Panzerkampfwagen III Ausf. N (Sd.Kfz.141/2) (2 figures)	2008	Yes	Rebox from 35215 with new parts
35291	German 3ton 4x2 Cargo Truck (2 figures)	2008	Yes	New tool
35292	German Panzerkampfwagen II Ausf. A/B/C (Sd.Kfz.121) (French Campaign) (1 figure)	2008	Yes	New tool
35293	German Infantry Set (French Campaign) (5 figures)	2008	Yes	New tool
35294	Italian Self-Propelled Gun Semovente M40 (2 figures)	2008	No	Rebox from 35078 with new parts
35295	German Panzerjäger "Jagdtiger" (Sd.Kfz.186) Frühe Produktion (2 figures)	2008	Yes	New tool
35296	Italian Medium Tank Carro Armato M13/40 (2 figures)	2008	Yes	Rebox from 35034 with new parts
35297	German Schwerer Panzerspähwagen 8-Rad "Afrika-Korps" (Sd.Kfz.232) (2 figures)	2009	Yes	Rebox from 35032 with new parts
35298	German Field Commander Set (5 figures)	2009	Yes	New tool
35299	German Panzerkampfwagen II Ausf. C (Sd.Kfz.121) "Polish Campaign" (4 figures)	2009	No	Rebox from 35292 with new parts
35300	British Infantry Tank Mk.IIA* Matilda Mk.III/IV (3 figures)	2009	Yes	New tool
35301	Citroën Traction 11CV Staff Car (1 figure)	2009	Yes	New tool
35302	German 3.7 cm Flak 37 Anti-Aircraft Gun w/Crew (5 figures)	2009	No	Rebox from 35145 with new parts
35303	Russian Heavy Self-Propelled Gun JSU-152 (2 figures)	2009	Yes	New tool
35304	German Kübelwagen Type 82 Ramcke Parachute Brigade (5 figures)	2009	No	Rebox from 35213 with new parts
35305	German Steyr Type 1500A/01 & Africa Corps Infantry at rest (4 figures)	2009	No	Rebox from 35225 with new parts
35306	Russian Infantry Anti-Tank Team (5 figures)	2009	No	New tool
35307	German Jagdtiger Mid Production Commander Otto Carius (3 figures)	2010	No	Rebox from 35295 with new parts
35308	British Light Utility Car 10HP (1 figure)	2010	Yes	New tool
35309	Russian Tank BT-7 Model 1935 (2 figures)	2010	No	New tool
35310	Finnish Army Sturmgeschütz III Ausf.G (1 figure)	2010	Yes	Rebox from 35281 with new parts
35311	Russian Assault Infantry 1941-1942 (5 figures)	2010	No	New tool
35312	U.S. Howitzer Motor Carriage M8 "Awaiting Orders" Set (3 figures)	2010	Yes	Rebox from 35110 with new parts
35313	U.S. Light Tank M5A1 Pursuit Operation Set w/US Mortar Team (4 figures)	2010	Yes	Rebox from 35097 with new parts
35314	WWII German Africa Korps Infantry Set (5 figures)	2011	No	New tool
35315	German Jerry Can Set (Early Type)	2011	Yes	Rebox
35316	British BSA M20 Motorcycle w/Military Police (2 figures)	2011	Yes	New tool
35317	6X4 Truck Krupp Protze (Kfz. 70) Personnel Carrier (3 figures)	2011	Yes	Rebox from 35104 with new parts
35318	Finnish Army Assault Gun BT-42 (1 figure)	2011	Yes	Rebox from 35309 with new parts
35319	U.S. Tank T26E4 Super Pershing (5 figures)	2011	No	Rebox from 35254 with new parts
35320	WWII German Field Military Police Set (5 figures, 1 dog)	2011	No	New tool
35321	Simca 5 Staff Car (German Army) (1 figure)	2012	Yes	New tool
35322	Israeli Tank M1 Super Sherman (2 figures)	2012	Yes	Rebox from 35122 with new parts
35323	Israeli Tank M51 (2 figures)	2012	Yes	New tool
35324	Iraqi Tank T-55 "Enigma" (1 figure)	2012	Yes	Rebox from 35257 with new parts
35325	German Schwerer Jagdpanzer "Elefant" (Sd.Kfz.184) (3 figures)	2012	Yes	New tool
35326	U.S. Main Battle Tank M1A2 SEP Abrams TUSK II (2 figures)	2012	Yes	Rebox from 35124 with new parts
35327	Russian Tank BT-7 Model 1937 (2 figures)	2013	Yes	Rebox from 35309 with new parts
35328	Israeli Tank Tiran 5 (2 figures)	2013	Yes	Rebox from 35257 with new parts
35329	J.G.S.D.F. Type 10 Tank (2 figures)	2013	Yes	New tool
35330	U.S. 6X6 Cargo Truck M561 Gama Goat (1 figure)	2013	Yes	New tool
35331	Japan Type 1 self-propelled gun (6 figures)	2013	Yes	Rebox of 35095 and 35090
35332	U.S. Utility Truck M151A2 "Grenada 1983" (3 figures)	2013	No	Rebox from 35123 with new parts
35333	British Paratroopers & Bicycle Set (2 figures)	2013	No	New tool
35334	U.S. Utility Truck M151A1 "Vietnam War" (1 figure)	2013	Yes	Rebox from 35123 with new parts
35335	German Nashorn 8.8 cm Pak43/1 auf Geschützwagen III/IV (Sd.Kfz.164) (4 figures)	2014	Yes	New tool
35336	Ford GPA Amphibian ¼ ton 4x4 Truck (3 figures)	2014	Yes	Rebox from 35043 with new parts
35337	British Paratroopers w/Small Motorcycle (4 figures)	2014	No	New tool
35338	Toyota Model AB Phaeton (1 figure)	2014	No	New tool
35339	WW I British Infantry Set (5 figures)	2014	Yes	New tool
35340	German Jagdpanzer IV/70(V) lang (Sd.Kfz.162/1) (2 figures)	2014	Yes	New tool
35341	Japanese Army Officer Set (4 figures)	2014	Yes	New tool
35342	U.S. 6X6 Ambulance Truck M792 Gama Goat (2 figures)	2014	No	Rebox from 35330 with new parts
35343	German Africa Corps Luftwaffe Artillery Crew Set (8 figures)	2015	Yes	Rebox of figures from 35283
35344	French Medium Tank Somua S35 (1 figure)	2015	Yes	New tool
35345	German Tank Panther Ausf.D Early Version (Sd.Kfz. 171) (2 figures)	2015	Yes	New tool
35346	U.S. Medium Tank M4A3E8 Sherman "Easy Eight" European Theater (1 figure)	2015	Yes	New tool
35347	U.S. Tank Crew Set (European Theater) (6 figures)	2015	Yes	New tool
35348	Russian Self-Propelled Gun SU-76M (3 figures)	2016	Yes	New tool
35349	French Light Tank AMX-13 (1 figure)	2016	No	New tool
35350	U.S. Tank Destroyer M10 Mid Production (3 figures)	2016	Yes	New tool
35351	U.S. Self-Propelled 155mm Gun M40 (8 figures)	2016	Yes	New tool
35352	British Infantry Tank Valentine Mk.II/IV (2 figures)	2017	Yes	New tool
35353	German Sturmpanzer IV Brummbär Späte Produktion (Sd.Kfz 166) (2 figures)	2017	Yes	New tool
35354	Wehrmacht Tank Crew Set (8 figures)	2017	Yes	New tool
35355	Infantry Tank Matilda Mk.III/IV "Red Army" (2 figures)	2017	No	Rebox from 35300 with new parts
35356	British Self-Propelled Anti-Tank Gun Archer (3 figures)	2017	Yes	New tool
35357	German Assault Pioneer Team & Goliath Set (3 figures)	2018	Yes	New tool
35358	German Self-Propelled Howitzer Wespe (Italian Front) (4 figures)	2018	Yes	Rebox from 35200 with new parts
35359	U.S. Medium Tank M4A3E8 Sherman "Easy Eight" (2 figures)	2018	Yes	Rebox from 35346 with new parts
35360	U.S. Light Tank M3 Stuart Late Production (1 figure)	2018	Yes	New tool
35361	J.G.S.D.F. Type 16 Maneuver Combat Vehicle (2 figures)	2018	No	New tool
35362	French Main Battle Tank Leclerc Series 2 (1 figure)	2018	Yes	Rebox from 35279 with new parts
35363	Russian Scout Car M3A1 (5 figures)	2018	Yes	New tool
35364	German Tank Destroyer Marder III M "Normandy Front" (5 figures)	2019	Yes	Rebox from 35255 with new parts
35365	U.S. Tank M551 Sheridan Vietnam War (3 figures)	2019	Yes	New tool
35366	British Tank Destroyer M10 IIC Achilles (4 figures)	2019	Yes	Rebox from 35350 with new parts
35367	German Panzerhaubitze Hummel Late Production (Sd.Kfz. 165) (3 figures)	2019	Yes	New tool
35368	J.G.S.D.F. Light Armored Vehicle (1 figure)	2019	Yes	Rebox from 35275 with new parts
35369	German Tank Panzerkampfwagen 38(t) Ausf. E/F (1 figure)	2019	Yes	New tool
35370	German Jagdpanzer Marder I (Sd.Kfz. 135) (2 figures)	2020	Yes	New tool
35371	German Infantry Set (Mid-WWII) (5 figures)	2020	Yes	New tool
35372	Russian Heavy Tank KV-1 Model 1941, Early Production (1 figure)	2020	Yes	New tool
35373	French Light Tank R35 (1 figure)	2020	Yes	New tool
35374	German Tank Panzerkampfwagen IV Ausf. F (Sd.Kfz. 161) (3 figures)	2020	Yes	Rebox from 35181 with new parts
35375	Russian Heavy Tank KV-2 (2 figures)	2021	Yes	Rebox from 35372 with new parts
35376	U.S. Tank Destroyer M18 Hellcat (1 figure)	2021	Yes	New tool
35377	German Kettenkraftrad (Mid-production) (Sd.Kfz.2) (3 figures)	2021	Yes	New tool
35378	German Tank Panzerkampfwagen IV Ausf.G (Early Production) (5 figures)	2022	Yes	Rebox from 35181 with new parts
35379	U.S. Infantry Scout Set (5 figures)	2023	Yes	New tool
35380	British Cruiser Tank A34 Comet (2 figures)	2023	Yes	New tool
35381	German Panzer IV/70(A) (1 figure)	2023	Yes	Rebox from 35340 with new parts
35382	German Infantry Set Late WWII (5 figures)	2023	Yes	New tool
35383	J.G.S.D.F. Type 16 MCV C5 w/Winch (3 figures)	2023	Yes	Rebox from 35361 with new parts
35384	German KS600 Motorcycle & Sidecar (3 figures)	2024	Yes	New tool
35385	Livestock Set II	2024	Yes	New tool
35386	German Machine Gun Team (Mid-WWII) (5 figures)	2024	Yes	New tool
35387	German Main Battle Tank Leopard 2 A7V (2 figures)	2024	Yes	New tool
35388	German Tank Panzerkampfwagen I Ausf.B (1 figure)	2024	Yes	New tool
35389	French Light Tank H39 Pz.Kpfw.38H 735(f) (1 figure)	2025	Yes	New tool
35390	U.S. Tank Destroyer M36 (1 figure)	2025	Yes	New tool
35391	U.S. Light Tank M24 Chaffee (European Theater) (2 figures)	2026	Yes	New tool
35392	German 5cm Anti-Tank Gun (PaK 38) (4 figures)	2025	Yes	New tool
35393	German Schwimmwagen Type 166 (Wide Wheel Version) (2 figures)	2026	Yes	Rebox from 35224 with new parts
35394	German Tractor RSO/01 (1 figure)	2026	Yes	New tool
35395		202-	-	-
35396		202-	-	-

*This list is incomplete, please help out and add more products

=== 1/48 military miniatures series ===
Tamiya has found a niche market of 1/48 scale military miniatures, designed as a smaller alternative to the larger 1/35 kits. As the average Japanese house is smaller than those amongst other nations, smaller kits that can be neatly put into smaller kit boxes after assembly and stored away are proven to be more popular by necessity. Utilizing the specifications of their 1/35 kits, many parts in 1/48 scale kits are simply scaled-down versions of their 1/35 counterpart, with a notable exception of tracks being molded in plastic in 1/48, instead of somewhat less detailed vinyl tracks often seen in 1/35 kits. Starting in 2004, early kits from this series featured metallic chassis, which served to add weight to the models of this smaller scale. Tamiya has put out an average of 1 new kit a month since the launch of the series as a way of blocking entry into the 1/48 scale market for Chinese makers. As of 2015, over 80 models are available from Tamiya in 1/48 scale, representing mainly the popular World War II tanks and vehicles. HobbyBoss, another Chinese maker, offers 1/48 tanks with full interior details for about the same price.

List of all Tamiya 1/48 Military miniatures
Kit number	Model	Release year	In production	Comment
32501	German Kübelwagen Type 82	2003	Yes	New tool
32502	German Kettenkraftrad w/Infantry Cart & Goliath Demolition Vehicle	2004	Yes	New tool
32503	German Kübelwagen Type 82 Afrika-Korps	2004	No	Rebox from 32501 with new parts
32504	German Tiger I Early Production Tank	2004	No	New tool
32505	U.S. M4 Sherman Early Production	2004	Yes	New tool-
32506	German Schwimmwagen Type 166 Pkw K2s	2005	Yes	-
32507	German Sturmgeschütz III Ausf. B (Sd.Kfz. 142)	2004	No	New tool
32508	WWII Diorama-Set Brick Wall&Sandbag	2005	Yes	New tool
32509	Road sign set	2005	No	New tool
32510	Jerry Can Set	2005	Yes	New tool
32511	German Jagdpanzer 38(t) Hetzer Mittlere Produktion	2005	No	New tool
32512	WW II German Infantry Set	2005	Yes	New tool
32513	WWII U.S. Army Infantry GI Set	2005	Yes	New tool
32514	German Panzer Grenadier Set Late WWII	2005	No	New tool
32515	Russian Tank T34/76 Model 1941 (Cast Turret)	2005	Yes	New tool
32516	British Universal Carrier Mk.II	2005	No	New tool
32517	Citroën Traction 11CV staff car	2005	No	New tool
32518	German Panzerkampfwagen IV Ausf.J (Sd.Kfz.161/2)	2006	Yes	New tool
32519	U.S. Tank Destroyer M10 Mid Production	2005	Yes	New tool
32520	German Panther Type G Panzerkampfwagen V Panther Ausf.G (Sd.Kfz.171)	2005	Yes	-
32521	Russian Infantry & Tank Crew	2005	Yes	New tool
32522	German Tank Destroyer Jagdpanther Late Version	2005	Yes	-
32523	U.S. Medium Tank M4A1 Sherman	2006	Yes	Rebox from 32505 with new parts
32524	German Panzerkampfwagen III Ausf. L (Sd.Kfz. 141/1)	2006	Yes	New tool
32525	German Sturmgeschütz III Ausf. G (Sd.Kfz. 142/1)	2006	No	Rebox from 32507 with new parts
32526	WWII British Infantry Set European Campaign	2006	Yes	New tool
32527	Russian Tank Destroyer SU-122	2006	No	-
32528	British Cruiser Tank Mk.VIII, A27M Cromwell Mk.IV	2006	Yes	-
32529	German Tiger I Initial Production Tiger I (Africa Corps)	2006	No	Rebox from 32504 with new parts
32530	WWII German Infantry On Maneuvers	2006	Yes	New tool
32531	Volkswagen Type 82E Staff Car	2006	No	-
32532	British Sherman IC Firefly	2006	Yes	Rebox from X with new parts
32533	German German Aircraft Power Supply Unit & Kettenkraftrad	2006	No	Rebox from X with new parts
32534	German 6x4 Truck Krupp Protze L2H143	2007	No	-
32535	Russian Heavy Tank KV-1	2006	No	-
32536	German King Tiger Production Turret	2006	Yes	-
32537	U.S. Medium Tank M26 Pershing	2005	No	-
32538	Russian Heavy Tank KV-2 Gigant	2006	No	Rebox from 32535 with new turret
32539	German King Tiger Porsche Turret	2006	No	Rebox from 32536 with new parts
32540	German Sturmgeschütz III Ausf. G (Sd.Kfz. 142/1) Frühe Version	2006	No	Rebox from 32525 with new parts
32541	British Cruiser Tank Mk.VI Crusader Mk.I/II	2007	No	-
32542	Russian Field Car GAZ-67B	2007	No	-
32543	German Panzerkampfwagen III Ausf. N (Sd.Kfz. 141/2)	2007	No	Rebox from X with new parts
32544	German Flakpanzer IV Wirbelwind	2007	No	Rebox from X with new parts
32545	Russian Heavy Tank KV-1 (w/Applique Armor)	2007	No	
32546	British Crusader Mk.III Anti-Aircraft Tank Mk.III	2007	Yes	Rebox from X with new parts
32547	Field Maintenance Set WWII German Tank Crew	2007	Yes	New tool
32548	U.S. 2.5 Ton 6x6 Cargo Truck	2007	Yes	-
32549	German Steyr Type 1500A/01	2007	Yes	-
32550	German Greif (Sd.Kfz. 250/3)	2007	No	-
32551	U.S. M8 Light Armored Car Greyhound	2007	No	-
32552	WWII U.S. Army Infantry At Rest with Jeep	2007	Yes	New tool
32553	German Steyr 1500 Kommandeurwagen	2007	Yes	Rebox from 32549 with new parts
32554	German 20mm Flakvierling 38 w/4 figures	2008	Yes	-
32555	British Cruiser Tank Mk.VI Crusader Mk.III	2008	No	Rebox from X with new parts
32556	U.S. M20 Armored Utility Car	2008	No	Rebox from 32551 with new parts
32557	WWII Famous General Set	2008	Yes	New tool
32558	Japanese 4x4 Light Vehicle Type 95 Kurogane	2008	Yes	-
32559	U.S. Army Staff Car Model 1942	2008	No	-
32560	German Tank Destroyer Marder III	2008	No	-
32561	WWII German Africa Corps Infantry Set	2008	No	-
32562	British Light Utility Car 10HP	2008	Yes	-
32563	US Modern 4x4 Humvee Cargo Vehicle	2009	No	-
32564	German Mtl.SPW. Ausf.D (Sd.kfz 251/1)	2009	Yes	-
32565	Japanese Navy Komatsu G40 Bulldozer	2010	Yes	-
32566	German Mtl.SPW. (Sd.Kfz.251/1) Ausf.D "Stuka zu Fuss"	2010	No	-
32567	U.S. Modern 4x4 Utility Vehicle w/Grenade Launcher	2010	No	Rebox from X with new parts
32568	German Tank Destroyer Marder III M	2010	No	Rebox from X with new parts
32569	German Heavy Tank Destroyer Jagdtiger (Sd.Kfz. 186) Early Production	2010	Yes	-
32570	German Panzerkampfwagen II Ausf. A/B/C (Sd.Kfz. 121) (French Campaign)	2011	Yes	-
32571	Russian Heavy Tank JS-2 Model 1944 ChKZ	2012	Yes	-
32572	British Infantry Tank Mk.IIA* Matilda Mk.III/IV	2012	Yes	-
32573	German Flakpanzer IV Möbelwagen (w/Flak 43)	2012	No	Rebox from X with new parts
32574	German 8-Wheeled Heavy Armored Car (Sd.Kfz.232)	2013	Yes	-
32575	German Tiger I Late Production	2013	Yes	Rebox from 32504 with new parts
32576	Russian Armored Car BA-64B	2013	No	-
32577	Russian 1.5 ton Cargo Truck Model 1941	2014	No	-
32578	German Motorcycle & Sidecar	2014	Yes	-
32579	U.S. 2 1/2TON 6x6 Airfield Fuel Truck	2014	Yes	Rebox from X with new parts
32580	German 6x4 Towing Truck Kfz.69 with 3.7 cm Pak	2014	No	Rebox from X with new parts
32581	British Armored Scout Car "Dingo" Mk.II	2014	Yes	-
32582	British Tank Destroyer M10 IIC Achilles	2014	Yes	-
32583	German Panzerkampfwagen 38(t) Ausf.E/F	2015	Yes	-
32584	German Tank Panzerkampfwagen IV Ausf.H Late Production	2015	Yes	Rebox from X with new parts
32585	German 3ton 4x2 Cargo Truck	2015	Yes	-
32586	German Transport Vehicle Horch Type 1a	2015	Yes	-
32587	British 7ton Armored Car Mk.IV	2016	Yes	-
32588	Japan Ground Self Defense Force Type 10 Tank	2016	Yes	-
32589	German Heavy Tank Destroyer Elefant	2016	Yes	-
32590	Japan Ground Self Defense Force Light Armored Vehicle	2016	Yes	-
32591	German 38 cm Assault Mortar Sturmtiger	2017	Yes	-
32592	U.S. Main Battle Tank M1A2 Abrams	2017	Yes	-
32593	German Heavy Tractor SS-100	2017	No	-
32594	British Tank Churchill Mk. VII Crocodile	2018	Yes	-
32595	U.S. Medium Tank M4A3E8 Sherman "Easy Eight"	2018	Yes	-
32596	Japan Ground Self Defense Force Type 16 Maneuver Combat Vehicle	2019	Yes	-
32597	German Tank Panther Ausf.D	2019	Yes	REBOX
32598	Russian Medium Tank T-55	2020	Yes	-
32599	Russian Medium Tank T-34-85	2021	Yes	-
32600	German Self-Propelled Heavy Anti-Tank Gun Nashorn	2021	Yes	-
32601	British Main Battle Tank Challenger 2 (Desertised)	2022	Yes	-
32602	WWII Wehrmacht Infantry Set	2023	Yes	-
32603	German Heavy Tank Tiger I Early Production (Eastern Front)	2023	Yes	Uses plastic instead of metal hull but otherwise identical to 32504
32604	U.S. Howitzer Motor Carriage M8	2023	Yes	-
32605	British 2-ton 4x2 Ambulance (Austin K2/Y)	2023	Yes	New tool
32606	U.S. Light Tank M5A1 Stuart	2024	Yes	New tool
32607	German Main Battle Tank Leopard 2 A7V	2025	Yes	New tool
32608	-	2025	Yes	New tool

*This list is incomplete, please help out and add more products

=== 1/16 big tank series ===
List of all Tamiya 1/16 Big tanks
Kit number	Model	Release year	In production	Comment
36201	King Tiger Porsche Turret	1981	No	-
36202	German Kübelwagen Type 82 Africa Corps w/ Feldmarschall ROMMEL	2000	No	-
36203	German Tiger Early Production	2000	No	-
36204	German King Tiger Production Turret	2002	No	-
36205	German Kübelwagen Type 82 European Campaign	2002	No	-
36206	Leopard 2 A6 Main Battle Tank (Display Model)	2005	No	-
36207	Leopard A4 Main Battle Tank (Display Model)	2010	No	-
36208	Flakpanzer Gepard (Display Model)	2011	No	-
36209	Japan Ground Self Defense Force Type 10 Tank	2014	No	-
36210	German Tank Destroyer Sd.Kfz. 173 Panzerjäger "Jagdpanther" Late Version	2017	No	-
36211	Panzerkampfwagen IV Ausf. J Sd.Kfz. 161/2	2017	No	-
36212	U.S. Main Battle Tank M1A2 Abrams (Display Model)	2017	No	-
36213	U.S. Airborne Tank M551 Sheridan (Display Model)	2019	Yes	-

=== 1/16 world figure series ===
Figures in 1/16 scale.

List of all Tamiya 1/16 world figures
Kit number	Model	Release year	In production	Comment
36301	Wehrmacht Tank Crewman	1998	Yes	-
36302	German Luftwaffe Ace Pilot	1999	Yes	-
36303	WWII German Elite Infantryman	1999	Yes	-
36304	WWII German Infantryman (Reversible Winter Uniform)	1999	Yes	-
36305	Feldmarschall Rommel (German Africa Corps)	1999	Yes	-
36306	WWII German Machine Gunner (Greatcoat)	2000	Yes	-
36307	WWII Wehrmacht Infantryman (on Maneuver)	2004	No	-
36308	Modern U.S. Army Infantryman (Desert Uniform)	2004	Yes	-
36309	Bundeswehr Tank Crewman	2004	Yes	-
36310	WWII Wehrmacht Tank Crewman Africa Corps	2005	No	-
36311	WWII German Machine Gun Ammo-Belt Loader (Carrying Tripod)	2006	No	-
36312	Japanese Fighter Pilot - WWII Imperial Navy	2006	Yes	-
36313	WWII German Field Commander	2010	Yes	-
36314	WWII Russian Field Commander	2010	Yes	-
36315	WWII Wehrmacht Officer	2012	No	-
36316	Japan Ground Self Defense Force Tank Crew Set	2015	Yes	-

== Aircraft models ==
Tamiya produces aircraft scale models in mainly 1/48, but also in 1/72 (Warbird collection) and 1/32 scale. Tamiya made aircraft in the 1/100 scale in the '60s and early '70s but this was abandoned later on.In aircraft models Tamiya offers a few clear skinned kits showing interior parts of aircraft. A few motorized kits are available also which feature spinning props. Some kits even include sound effect modules.

Tamiya's aircraft kits often include metal weights that prevent the aircraft from sitting on their tails, Some kits produced recently can be made with detachable wingtips and landing gears. They also come in a box that can be turned into a raised box that could safely house the finished model after its completion. This simpler construction helps Tamiya stay on top of the miniature aircraft market.

=== 1/48 aircraft ===
Their line of static model aircraft, primarily in 1/48 scale, are widely considered to be state-of-the-art. The 1990s release of the Spitfire, for example, had great ease of construction and attention to detail with the new molds having very fine raised details. As with many other Japanese model makers dealing with WWII weapons Tamiya also prefers to focus on Japanese weapons first, due to the considerable size of the Japanese domestic market: The 1/48 scale P-47 Thunderbolt, one of the most famous WWII fighters, has been produced only recently, while the Hellcat, an American naval fighter, is yet to be produced. The Japanese Zero fighter was the first to be produced in 1/48 scale and the first prop fighter added to the larger 1/32 scale in 2006 is once again the Japanese Zero.

In 2023, Tamiya caught everyone by surprise with its announcement of a 1/48 F-35A Lightning II.

Tamiya has designed various kits and versions of the following airplanes in 1/48:

- Japanese WWII: Aichi M6A1 Seiran, Ki-61-Id Hien, A6M3 Zero Fighter, N1K1-Ja Shiden
- German WWII: Messerschmitt Bf109, Focke-Wulf Fw190,
- British WWII: De Havilland Mosquito, Supermarine Spitfire
- Russian WWII: Ilyushin IL-2 Shturmovik
- American WWII: P-47D Thunderbolt, P-51D Mustang, F4U-1D Corsair, F6F-3 Hellcat
- American modern jets: F4D-1 Skyray, F-14 Tomcat, F-16 Falcon, F-35 Lightning II

List of all Tamiya 1/48 Aircraft
Kit number	Model	Release year	In production	Comment
MA-001	Mitsubishi A6M5 Zero Fighter Type 52 (Zeke)	1963	No	This kit came in 1/50 scale before 1/48 was established
MA-002	Kawanishi N1K2-J Shiden-Kai 'George'	-	No	1/50 scale
MA-003	Japanese Navy Interceptor Fighter Raiden J2M3	1963	No	1/50 scale
MA-004	A6M7 Zero Fighter Bomber Type 63	-	No	1/50 scale
MA-005	Nakajima Ki-44 Shoki (Tojo) Type-2 Fighter	1964	No	1/50 scale
MA-006	Japanese Fighter Ki61 Hien (Tony)	1964	No	1/50 scale
MA-007	Nakajima Ki-43 I Hayabusa (Oscar) Type-1 Fighter	1964	No	1/50 scale
MA-008	Kawasaki Type-5 Fighter (Tony)	1970	No	1/50 scale
MA-009	Nakajima Saiun (Myrt) C6N1 Carrier Bone Reconnaissance	1965	No	1/50 scale
MA-010	Type 99 Japanese Navy Carrier Dive-bomber	1966	No	1/50 scale
MA-011	Mitsubishi F1M2 Type 0 Observation Seaplane (Pete)	1970	No	1/50 scale
MA-112	Hawker Siddeley Harrier GR.Mk.1	1971	No	-
61013	Nakajima Ki-84-IA Hayate (Frank)	1972	No	-
61014	Kawasaki Hughes H-500	1974	No	-
61015	Hughes OH-6 Cayuse	1972	No	-
61016	Mitsubishi A6M2 zero fighter (ZEKE) Type 21	1973	No	-
61017	Nakajima A6M2-N Type 2 Floatplane Fighter (Rufe)	1973	No	-
61018	Mitsubishi J2M3 Interceptor Raiden Jack	1973	No	-
61019	Brewster F2A-2 Buffalo	1974	No	-
61020	Avro Lancaster BI/BIII	1975	Yes	-
61021	Dambuster Grand Slam Bomber Lancaster BI Special 22000IB Bomb	1975	Yes	Rebox from X with new parts
61022	U.S. Air Force General Dynamics F-16 Fighter	1976	No	-
61023	USAF Fairchild Republic A-10A Thunderbolt II	1977	No	-
61024	McDonnell Douglas F-15A Eagle	1978	No	-
61025	Mitsubishi A6M3 Zero Fighter (Hamp)	1982	Yes	Rebox from X with new parts
61026	Royal Navy Sea Harrier FRS.1	1982	No	Rebox from X with new parts
61027	Mitsubishi A6M5c Zero Fighter (Zeke)	1983	No	Rebox from X with new parts
61028	U.S.A.F. Fairchild Republic A-10A Thunderbolt II	1991	Yes	Rebox from X with new decals
61029	McDonnell Douglas F-15C Eagle	1991	Yes	Rebox from 61024 with new parts
61030	Japanese Air Self Defense Forces F-15J Eagle	1992	Yes	Rebox from 61024 with new parts
61031	U.S.Navy Brewster F2A-2 Buffalo	1993	Yes	Rebox from X with new decals
61032	Supermarine Spitfire Mk.I	1993	Yes	-
61033	Supermarine Spitfire Mk.Vb	1994	Yes	Rebox from X with new parts
61034	Grumman F4F-4 Wildcat	1994	Yes	-
61035	Supermarine Spitfire Mk.Vb Trop.	1994	Yes	Rebox from X with new parts
61036	Kawanishi N1K1 Kyofu Type 11	1994	Yes	-
61037	Focke-Wulf Fw190 A-3	1994	Yes	-
61038	Kawanishi N1K1-Ja Shiden Type 11	1994	Yes	-
61039	Focke-Wulf Fw190 F-8	1995	Yes	Rebox from X with new parts
61040	North American P-51D Mustang	1995	Yes	Also has an 8th AF P-51D/F-6D Armée de l'Airn version (F)
61041	Focke-Wulf Fw190 D-9	1995	Yes	-
61042	North American P-51B Mustang	1995	Yes	Rebox from X with new parts
61043	Mikoyan-Gurevich MiG-15 bis	1996	Yes	-
61044	North American F-51D Mustang Korean War	1996	Yes	Rebox from X with new parts
61045	Mitsubishi Ki-46 Shitei III Dinah Recon Plane	1996	Yes	-
61046	Chance Vought F4U-1/2 Bird Cage Corsair	1996	Yes	-
61047	North American RAF Mustang III	1996	Yes	Rebox from X with new parts
61048	Dewoitine D.520	1996	Yes	-
61049	Mitsubishi Isshikirikko Type 11 G4M1	1996	Yes	-
61050	Messerschmitt Bf 109E3	1996	Yes	-
61051	Gloster Meteor F.1	1997	Yes	-
61052	V-1 (Fieseler Fi103)	1997	Yes	-
61053	Bristol Beaufighter Mk.VI	1997	Yes	-
61054	Aichi M6A1 Seiran	1997	Yes	-
61055	Douglas F4D-1 Skyray	1998	Yes	-
61056	Hyakushiki Shitei III Kai Air Defense Fighter	1997	Yes	Rebox from X with new parts
61057	Heinkel He 219 A-7 Uhu	1997	Yes	-
61058	Douglas A-1H Skyraider U.S. Navy	1998	Yes	-
61059	Lockheed F-117A Nighthawk	1998	Yes	-
61060	Republic F-84G Thunderjet	1998	Yes	Also has an Italian version (F)
61061	Vought F4U-1D Corsair	1998	Yes	Rebox from X with new parts
61062	De Havilland Mosquito FB Mk.VI/NF Mk.II	1998	Yes	-
61063	Messerschmitt Bf109E-4/7 Trop	1998	Yes	Rebox from X with new parts
61064	Bristol Beaufighter Mk.VI Night Fighter	1999	Yes	-
61065	Gloster Meteor F.1 - V-1 (Fieseler Fi103)	1998	Yes	Rebox from 61051 with new parts
61066	De Havilland Mosquito B Mk.IV/PR Mk.IV	1999	Yes	Rebox from 61062 with new parts
61067	Bristol Beaufighter TF.Mk.X	1999	Yes	Rebox from 61064 with new parts
61068	Fairey Swordfish Mk.I	1999	Yes	-
61069	Fairey Swordfish Photo Etched Bracing Wire Set (for Experts)	1999	Yes	-
61070	Vought F4U-1A Corsair	1999	Yes	Rebox from X with new parts
61071	Fairey Swordfish Mk.I Floatplane	2000	Yes	Rebox from X with new parts
61072	Fairey Swordfish Floatplane Photo Etched Bracing Wire Set	2000	Yes	-
61073	Douglas A-1J Skyraider U.S. Air Force	2000	Yes	Rebox from X with new parts
61074	Dornier Do 335A Pfeil	2000	Yes	-
61075	de Havilland Mosquito NF Mk.XIII/Mk.XVII	2000	Yes	Rebox from X with new parts
61076	Dornier Do335A-12 Trainer Anteater	2001	Yes	Rebox from X with new parts
61077	Republic F-84G 'Thunderbirds'	1998	Yes	Rebox from X with new parts
61078	Nakajima Night Fighter Gekko Type 11 Late production (Irving)	2001	Yes	-
61079	Fairey Swordfish Mk I "CLEAR EDITION"	2001	Yes	Rebox from X with new parts
61080	MiG 15 bis Clear Edition	2005	Yes	Rebox from X
61081	Focke-Wulf Fw190 D-9 JV44	2002	Yes	Rebox from X with new decals
61082	Messerschmitt Me 262 A-2a w/Kettenkraftrad	2002	Yes	-
61083	Gloster Meteor F.3	2002	Yes	Rebox from X with new parts
61084	Nakajima Night Fighter Gekko Type 11 Early production (Irving)	2002	Yes	Rebox from X with new parts
61085	Vought F4U-1D Corsair w/"Moto-Tug"	2002	Yes	Vought F4U-1D Corsair w/"Moto-Tug"
61086	Republic P-47D Thunderbolt "Razorback"	2002	Yes	New tool
61087	Messerschmitt Me262 A-1a	2002	Yes	Rebox from X with new parts
61088	Dornier Do335B-2 Pfeil Heavily Armed Version	2004	Yes	Rebox from X with new parts
61089	North American P-51D Mustang 8th A.F. Aces	2003	Yes	Rebox from X with new decals
61090	Republic P-47D Thunderbolt "Bubbletop"	2003	Yes	Rebox from X with new parts
61091	Messerschmitt Me 262 A-1a Clear Edition	2003	Yes	Rebox from X with new parts
61092	Mitsubishi Ki-46 III Type 100 Command Recon Plane (Dinah)	1998	Yes	-
61093	Nakajima J1N1-Sa Night Fighter Gekko Type 11 Kou (Irving)	2008	Yes	Rebox from X with new parts
61094	Brewster B-339 Buffalo "Pacific Theater	2004	Yes	Rebox from X with new parts
61095	Focke-Wulf Fw190 A-8/A-8 R2	2005	Yes	Rebox from X with new parts
61096	Republic P-47M Thunderbolt	2005	Yes	Rebox from X with new parts
61097	Heinkel He 162 A-2 "Salamander"	2006	Yes	-
61098	Lockheed Martin F-16CJ [Block 50] Fighting Falcon	2008	Yes	New tool
61099	Fairey Swordfish Mk.II	2007	Yes	Rebox from X with new parts
61101	Lockheed Martin F-16C [Block 25/32] Fighting Falcon ANG	2008	Yes	Rebox from 61098 with new parts
61102	General Dynamics F-16 C [Block 32/52] "Thunderbirds"	2008	Yes	Rebox from 61098 with new decals
61103	Mitsubishi A6M5/5a Zero Fighter (Zeke)	2008	Yes	New tool
61104	Focke-Wulf Fw190 F-8/9 w/Bomb Loading Set	2008	Yes	Rebox from X with new parts
61105	Avro Lancaster B Mk.I/III	2009	Yes	Rebox from X with new parts
61106	F-16C/N "Aggressor/Adversary"	2009	Yes	Rebox from 61098 with new parts
61107	WWII U.S. Navy Pilots w/Moto-Tug	2009	Yes	-
61108	Mitsubishi A6M3/3a Zero Fighter (Zeke)	2010	Yes	Rebox from 61103 with new parts
61109	Dewoitine D.520 "French Aces" w/Staff Car	2011	New tool	
61110	Mitsubishi G4M1 Model 11 Admiral Yamamoto Transport (w/17 Figures)	2011	Yes	Rebox from X with new parts
61111	Dambuster/Grand Slam Bomber Avro Lancaster B Mk.III Special "DAMBUSTER"	2012	Yes	Rebox from X with new parts
61112	Avro Lancaster BI/BIII	2012	Yes	Rebox from X with new part
61113	Ilyushin IL-2 Shturmovik	2012	Yes	New tool
61114	Grumman F-14A Tomcat	2016	Yes	New tool
61115	Kawasaki Ki-61-Id Hien (Tony)	2016	Yes	New tool
61116	Hayate & Kurogane Scenery set	2016	Yes	Rebox from X with new parts
61117	Messerschmitt Bf 109G-6	2017	Yes	New tool
61118	Grumman F-14D Tomcat	2018	Yes	Rebox from 61114 with new parts
61119	Supermarine Spitfire Mk.I	2018	Yes	New tool
61120	Lockheed P-38 F/G Lightning	2019	Yes	New tool
61121	McDonnell Douglas™ F-4B Phantom II™	2022	Yes	New tool
61122	Grumman® F-14A Tomcat™ (Late Model) Carrier Launch Set	2023	Yes	Rebox from 61114 with new parts
61123	Lockheed® P-38®J Lightning®	2023	Yes	Rebox from 61120 with new parts
61124	Lockheed Martin® F-35®A Lightning II®	2023	Yes	New tool
61125	Lockheed Martin® F-35®B Lightning II®	2023	Yes	Rebox from 61124 with new parts
61126	Grumman FM-1 Wildcat/Martlet Mk.V	2023	Yes	Rebox from XX with new parts
61127	Lockheed Martin® F-35®C Lightning II®	2025	Yes	Rebox from 61124 with new parts
61128	Messerschmitt Bf109 G-6 Late Model	2026	Yes	Rebox from 61117 with new parts
61129	Grumman F-14B Tomcat w/Shipboard towing tractor	202x	-	Rebox from 61114 with new parts

=== 1/72 warbird collection ===
Tamiya entered the 1/72 market rather late by releasing its first kit in 1993 (see kit 60701). However, this was a reboxed version of Italeri's F-16 and it would take until 2014 to design their own version of this jet (see kit 60786). Tamiya quickly got a large product line in this scale by reboxing more than 30 Italeri kits.

In 1997, they finally released a "non-Italeri" kit: the Japanese WWII floating plane Aichi M6A1 Seiran which is also available in 1/48 scale.

Tamiya has designed various kits and versions of the following airplanes in 1/72:

- Japanese WWII: Aichi M6A1 Seiran, Ki-61-Id Hien, A6M3 Zero Fighter, N1K1-Ja Shiden
- German WWII: Messerschmitt Bf109, Focke-Wulf Fw190,
- British WWII: De Havilland Mosquito, Supermarine Spitfire
- Russian WWII: Ilyushin IL-2 Sturmovik
- American WWII: P-47D Thunderbolt, P-51D Mustang, F4U-1D Corsair, F6F-3 Hellcat
- American modern jets: F4D-1 Skyray, F-14 Tomcat, F-16CJ Falcon, F-35 Lightning II

List of all Tamiya 1/72 Warbirds
Kit number	Model	Release year	In production	Comment
60701	General Dynamics/Lockheed F-16 Fighting Falcon	1993	No	Rebox from Italeri
60702	McDonnell Douglas F/A-18 Hornet	1993	No	Rebox from Italeri
60703	Lockheed F-117A Stealth	1993	No	Rebox from Italeri
60704	Mikoyan MiG-29 Fulcrum	1993	No	Rebox from Italeri
60705	Mil Mi-24 Hind	1993	No	Rebox from Italeri
60706	Sikorsky SH-60 Sea Hawk	1993	No	Rebox from Italeri
60707	Hughes AH-64 Apache	1993	No	Rebox from Italeri
60708	Bell AH-1W Super Cobra	1993	No	Rebox from Italeri
60709	Hughes AH-6 Night Fox	1993	No	Rebox from Italeri
60710	Eurocopter Tigre H.A.P.	1993	No	Rebox from Italeri
60711	Soviet Attack Helicopter Mil	1993	No	Rebox from Italeri
60712	Bell OH-58 Kiowa	1993	No	Rebox from Italeri
60713	McDonnell F-4G Phantom II	1994	No	Rebox from Italeri
60714	Lockheed/Boeing/General Dynamics YF-22A Lightning II	1994	No	Rebox from Italeri
60715	Northrop/MDD YF-23	1994	No	Rebox from Italeri
60716	Dassault Mirage 2000C	1994	No	Rebox from Italeri
60717	Dassault Rafale C	1994	No	Rebox from Italeri
60718	Kamov Ka-50 Hokum	1994	No	Rebox from Italeri
60719	Messerschmitt Bf110E	1994	No	Rebox from Italeri
60720	Tornado F3	1994	No	Rebox from Italeri
60721	McDonnell Douglas AV-8B Harrier II	1994	No	Rebox from Italeri
60722	Bell UH-1B Huey	1994	No	Rebox from Italeri
60723	BAe Hawk	1994	No	Rebox from Italeri
60724	Hughes OH-6A Cayuse	1995	No	Rebox from Italeri
60725	Chance Vought F4U-4B Corsair	2000	No	Rebox from Italeri
60726	Focke-Wulf Fw190D-9	1995	No	Rebox from Italeri
60727	IAI Kfir C7	1995	No	Rebox from Italeri
60728	Focke-Wulf Fw190A-8	1995	No	Rebox from Italeri
60729	Douglas A-4E/F Skyhawk	1995	No	Rebox from Italeri
60730	Henschel Hs129 B-2	1996	No	Rebox from Italeri
60731	EF-2000 Eurofighter	1996	No	Rebox from Italeri
60732	Northrop F-5E Tiger II	1996	No	Rebox from Italeri
60733	McDonnell Douglas F-4S Navy Phantom	1996	No	Rebox from Italeri
60734	Jaguar GR-1	1997	No	Rebox from Italeri
60735	JU-87 G-2 Stuka	1997	No	Rebox from Italeri
60736	J.M.S.D.F. HSS-1	1997	No	Rebox from Italeri
60737	Aichi M6A1 Seiran	1997	Yes	First 1/72 kit that Tamiya designed themselves
60738	Aichi M6A1-K Nanzan (Seiran Kai)	1997	Yes	Rebox from 60737 with new parts
60739	RAH-66 Comanche	1998	No	Rebox from Italeri
60740	USAF Bell X-1 Mach Buster	1998	No	Rebox from Hobby spot u
60741	Douglas F4D-1 Skyray	1998	Yes	-
60742	U.S. Navy/U.S. Marines A-6E Intruder	1999	No	Rebox from Italeri
60743	Sukhoi Su-34 Strike Flanker	1999	No	Rebox from Italeri
60744	A-10A Thunderbolt II	1999	No	Rebox from Italeri
60745	Republic F-84G Thunderjet	1999	Yes	-
60746	F/A-18E Super Hornet	1999	No	Rebox from Italeri
60747	De Havilland Mosquito FB Mk.VI/NF Mk.II	1999	Yes	-
60748	Supermarine Spitfire Mk.I	2000	Yes	-
60749	North American P-51D Mustang	2000	Yes	-
60750	Messerschmitt Bf 109 E-3	2000	Yes	-
60751	Focke-Wulf Fw190 D-9	2000	Yes	-
60752	Vought F4U-1D Corsair	2000	Yes	-
60753	De Havilland Mosquito B Mk.IV/PR Mk.IV	2000	Yes	Rebox from 60747 with new parts
60754	North American F-51D Mustang Korean War	2000	Yes	Rebox from 60749 with new parts
60755	Messerschmitt Bf109E-4/7 Trop	2000	Yes	Rebox from 60750 with new parts
60756	Supermarine Spitfire Mk.Vb/Mk.Vb Trop.	2000	Yes	Rebox from 60748 with new parts
60757	SU-27 B2 Sea-Flanker	2001	No	Rebox from Italeri
60758	A-129 Mangusta	2001	No	Rebox from Italeri
60759	JAS-39A Gripen	2001	No	Rebox from Italeri
60760	F-100D Super Sabre	2001	No	Rebox from Italeri
60761	KA-52 Alligator Russian Attack Helicopter	2001	No	Rebox from Italeri
60762	Republic F-84G "Thunderbirds" War Bird Collection (chrome plated)	2001	Yes	Rebox from 60745 with new decals
60763	Lockheed Martin F-22 Raptor	2001	No	Rebox from Italeri
60764	Boeing X-32 JSF	2001	No	Rebox from Italeri
60765	de Havilland Mosquito NF Mk.XIII/XVII	2001	Yes	Rebox from 60747 with new parts
60766	Focke-Wulf Fw190 A-3	2001	Yes	New tool
60767	Lockheed X-35 JSF	2001	No	Rebox from Italeri
60768	Kawanishi N1K1-Ja Shiden Type 11	2001	Yes	New tool
60769	Republic P-47D Thunderbolt "Razorback"	2004	Yes	New tool
60770	Republic P-47D Thunderbolt "Bubbletop"	2004	Yes	Rebox from 60769 with new parts
60771	Grumman F6F-3 Hellcat	2005	Yes	New tool
60772	Macchi MC202 Folgore	2005	Yes	Rebox from X with new decals
60773	North American P-51D Mustang 8th A.F. Aces	2005	Yes	Rebox from 60749 with new decals
60774	Vought F4U-1 Bird Cage Corsair	2006	Yes	Rebox from 60752 with new parts
60775	Vought F4U-1A Corsair	2006	Yes	Rebox from 60752 with new parts
60776	Junkers Ju87 B-2/R-2 Stuka	2007	Yes	Rebox from Italeri
60777	Junkers Ju88 C-6 Heavy Fighter	2007	Yes	Rebox from X
60778	Focke-Wulf Fw190 D-9 JV44	2007	Yes	Rebox from 60766 with new decals
60779	Mitsubishi A6M5 Zero Fighter (Zeke)	2012	Yes	New tool
60780	Mitsubishi A6M2b Zero Fighter	2012	Yes	Rebox from 60779 with new parts
60781	Ilyushin IL-2 Shturmovik	2013	Yes	New tool
60782	F-14A Tomcat	2012	Yes	Rebox from Italeri
60783	F-15E Strike Eagle	2012	Yes	Rebox from Italeri
60784	Mitsubishi A6M3 Zero Fighter Model 32 (Hamp)	2013	Yes	Rebox from 60779 with new parts
60785	Mitsubishi A6M3/3a Zero Fighter Model 22 (Zeke)	2013	Yes	Rebox from 60779 with new parts
60786	Lockheed Martin F-16CJ [Block 50] Fighting Falcon	2014	Yes	New tool
60787	Lockheed Martin F-35A Lightning II	2014	Yes	Rebox from Italeri
60788	Lockheed Martin® F-16®CJ [BLOCK50] Fighting Falcon®	2015	Yes	Rebox from 60786 with new parts
60789	Kawasaki Ki-61-Id Hien (Tony)	2018	Yes	New tool
60790	Messerschmitt Bf109 G-6	2019	Yes	New tool, comes also in a Swiss Edition
60791	Lockheed Martin® F-35®B Lightning II®	2022	Yes	Rebox from Italeri
60792	Lockheed Martin® F-35®A Lightning II®	2023	Yes	New tool
60793	Lockheed Martin® F-35®B Lightning II®	2024	Yes	Rebox from 60792 with new parts
60794	Lockheed Martin® F-35®C Lightning II®	2025	Yes	Rebox from 60792 with new parts
60795	Grumman F-14D Tomcat	2025	Yes	New tool
60796	-	202-	Yes	-

=== 1/32 aircraft ===
Tamiya has so far produced nine types of aircraft in the 1/32 scale, including

- Japanese WWII: A6M Zero Fighter
- British WWII: De Havilland Mosquito, Supermarine Spitfire
- American WWII: P-51 Mustang, F4U Corsair
- American modern jets: F-4 Phantom, F-14 Tomcat, F-15 Eagle, F-16 Falcon

In 2009, Tamiya introduced its 1:32 scale Supermarine Spitfire Mk. IXc, and North American Aviation P-51D Mustang model kits. These were soon accompanied by the Spitfire Mk. VIII and XVI variants, and a further P-51K variant in the same scale.

Tamiya designed the models with great attention to detail, and went so far as to include a complete scale models of the fighter's Rolls-Royce Merlin 66 engine. Innovative features of the models include the need to build and mount the scale Merlin to allow the fitment of magnet-held detachable engine cover panels; The option post-construction of displaying the model with retracted or extended undercarriage; and the inclusion of an incredibly fine and very well detailed cockpit.

Reviews of the Spitfire and Mustang found little to fault with the kits. Model building reviewers have praised the kit of the Spitfires in particular for their fidelity of form, and near-completeness of execution. The model's complexity and detail even gave rise to publications devoted explicitly to their construction and finishing.

In 2014, Tamiya followed the single engined fighters with the 1:32 scale DeHavilland Mosquito FB.IV. This also makes of the Merlin Engine model included in the earlier single engined fighters, as well as an equally detailed interior. It met with similar critical acclaim to that of the Spitfire and P-51D models, and also gave rise to book publication specific to its completion by modellers.

List of all Tamiya 1/32 Aircraft
Kit number	Model	Release year	In production	Comment
60301	Grumman F-14A Tomcat	1980	No	-
60302	McDonnell-Douglas F-15E Strike Eagle	1993	Yes	-
60303	Grumman F-14A Tomcat™ Version 1994	1994	Yes	Rebox with new parts
60304	McDonnell Douglas F-15C Eagle	1994	Yes	Rebox with new parts
60305	McDonnell F-4C/D Phantom II	1995	Yes	-
60306	McDonnell Douglas F-4J Phantom II	1997	Yes	Rebox with new parts
60307	McDonnell Douglas F-15J Eagle JASDF	1999	Yes	Rebox with new parts
60308	McDonnell Douglas F-4J Phantom II	2000	Yes	Rebox with new parts
60309	Zero Fighter Zeke Mitsubishi A6M5	2000	Yes	-
60310	McDonnell Douglas F-4E Phantom II Early Production	2002	Yes	Rebox with new parts
60311	Mitsubishi A6M5 Zero Fighter Zeke Real Sound Action Set	2001	Yes	Rebox with new parts
60312	McDonnell Douglas F-15E Strike Eagle w/Bunker Buster	2003	Yes	Rebox with new parts
60313	Grumman F-14A Tomcat Black Knights	2003	Yes	Rebox with new parts
60314	McDonnell Douglas F-4EJ Phantom II JASDF	2004	Yes	Rebox with new parts
60315	F-16CJ [Block 50] Fighting Falcon	2004	Yes	-
60316	F-16C Thunderbirds	2005	Yes	Rebox with new parts
60317	Mitsubishi A6M2b Zero Fighter Model 21 (Zeke)	2006	Yes	Rebox with new parts
60318	Mitsubishi A6M5 Zero Fighter Model 52 (Zeke)	2007	Yes	Rebox with new parts
60319	Supermarine Spitfire Mk.IXc	2009	Yes	-
60320	Supermarine Spitfire Mk.VIII	2010	Yes	Rebox with new parts
60321	Supermarine Spitfire Mk.XVIe	2011	Yes	Rebox with new parts
60322	North American P-51D Mustang™	2011	Yes	-
60323	North American P-51D/K Mustang™ (Pacific Theater)	2012	Yes	Rebox with new parts
60324	Vought F4U-1 Corsair® "Birdcage"	2013	Yes	-
60325	Vought F4U-1A Corsair®	2014	Yes	Rebox with new parts
60326	De Havilland Mosquito FB Mk.VI	2015	Yes	-
60327	Vought F4U-1D Corsair®	2017	Yes	Rebox with new parts
60328	North American F-51D Mustang Korean War	2020	Yes	Rebox with new parts

==== 1/100 combat plane series ====
Tamiya is also one of the few manufacturers of 1/100 scale aircraft. Originally called the Minijet Series, consisting of jet fighters plus a B-52, it was terminated in the 1980s but revived in 2004 and renamed the Combat Jet Series.

List of all Tamiya 1/100 Combat planes
Kit number	Model	Release year	In production	Comment
61601	Ilyushin IL-28 Beagle	1970	No	-
61602	MiG-21 Fishbed	1969	No	-
61603	Dassault Mirage III C	1968	No	-
61604	Messerschmitt Me262A & Me163B	1972	No	-
61605	McDonnell Douglas F-4EJ Phantom II	1969	No	-
61606	Grumman A-6A Intruder	1969	Yes	-
61607	L.T.V A-7A Corsair II	1968	No	-
61608	B.A.C. Lightning F Mk.6	1968	No	-
61609	MiG-19 Farmer-E	1968	No	-
61610	Fiat G.91/R1/R4	1968	No	-
PA-1010	Bell UH-1B Iroquois	1969	No	-
60008	Lockheed F-104J/G	1969	No	-

==== 1/100 Space Shuttle orbiter series ====
List of all Tamiya 1/100 Space shuttles
Kit number	Model	Release year	In production	Comment
60401	Space Shuttle Orbiter	1979	No	-
60402	Space Shuttle Atlantis	1979	Yes	-

== Car models ==
They produce many model car kits including road cars, sports racing cars, World Rally Championship cars, and Formula One racing cars. Usually these are 1/24 scale although the Formula One kits are 1/20 scale. A few street, racing, and F1 kits are also produced in 1/12 scale including the Ferrari 641/2, McLaren Honda MP4/6, and Williams Renault FW14B.

=== 1/24 sport cars series ===
Tamiya has over the years produced a huge number of cars in the 1/24 scale.

List of all Tamiya 1/24 Sport cars
Kit number	Model	Release year	In production	Comment
24001	"Martini" Porsche 935 Turbo 1976	1977	Yes	-Reboxed in 2023
24002	BMW 320i Racing Daytona 24hrs 1977	1977	No	-
24003	Lancia Stratos Turbo motorized	1977	No	-
24004	"Martini" Porsche 936 Turbo 1977	1978	No	-
24005	Lamborghini Countach LP400 lamborghini LINEA BERTONE	1978	No	-
24006	Lamborghini Countach LP500S	1978	No	Rebox from 24005 with new parts
24007	Toyota Celica LB Turbo Gr.5 1977	1978	No	-
24008	VW Golf Racing Group 2 Nürburgring 1000 km - 1977	1978	No	-
24009	Mazda Savanna RX-7 1978	1978	No	-
24010	Martini Porsche 935-78 Turbo	1978	No	Rebox from X with new decals
24011	Alpine Renault A442B Turbo 1978	1979	No	-
24012	"Martini" Porsche 936-78 Turbo 1978	1978	No	Rebox from X with new parts
24013	Datsun 280-ZX 1978	1979	No	-
24014	Ford Zakspeed Capri Turbo	1978	No	-
24015	Nissan Fairlady 280Z with T-Bar Roof	1979	Yes	Reboxed several times
24016	Mazda Savanna RX 7	1978	No	new parts in 1981
24017	Bluebird Turbo SSS-S	1979	No	new parts in 1979
24018	Nissan Leopard 280X.SF-L	1981	No	new tool in 1981
24019	Toyota Soarer turbo 2000 VR	1981	No	new tool 1981
24020	Nissan Leopard TR X Turbo	1981	No	
24021	Toyota Celica XX 2800 GT	1981	No	
24022	Nissan Skyline Turbo GT-E.S	1981	No	
24023	Nissan Skyline 2000 RS	1982	No	Rebox w/ new parts
24024	Renault 5 Turbo	1982	No	
24025	Nissan Skyline Hardtop 2000 Turbo GT-ES	1982	No	
24026	Honda City R with Motocompo	1987	No	
24027	Renault 5 Turbo Rally	1982	No	
24028	Nissan Skyline Hardtop 2000 RS	1982	No	Rebox w/ new parts
24029	Mercedes-Benz 500 SEC	1982	No	
24030	Honda City Turbo	1982	No	
24031	Audi Quattro	1983	No	
24032	Honda Prelude XX	1983	No	
24033	Toyota Celica Supra Marshall Car	1983	Yes	Rebox w/ new parts
24034	Campus Friends Set	1983	No	
24035	Nissan Fairlady 280ZT Pace Car	1983	No	
24036	Audi Quattro Rally	1983	No	Rebox w/ new parts
24037	Mercedes-Benz 500 SEC Lorinser	1983	No	
24038	Toyota Soarer 2800GT	1983	No	Rebox w/ new parts
24039	Morris Mini Cooper 1275S Mk.1	1983	No	
24040	Honda Ballade Sports CR-X 1.5i	1983	No	
24041	Toyota Hi-Ace Quick Delivery	1983	No	
24042	Nissan Fairlady Z 300ZX Two -Seater	1984	No	
24043	Nissan Leopard 280X-SF-L	1984	No	Rebox w/ new parts
24044	Honda City Turbo II Bulldog	1984	No	
24045	Honda Ballade Sports Mugen CR-X Pro	1982	No	
24046	Lotus Super 7 Series II	1984	No	
24047	Porsche 956 '83 Le Mans 24 Hour Race Winner	1984	No	
24048	Morris Mini Cooper 1275S Rally	1984	No	Rebox w/ new parts
24049	Newman Porsche 956	1985	No	Rebox w/ new decals
24050	Honda City Cabriolet	1984	No	
24051	Honda Civic	1984	No	
24052	Ford Sierra XR-4i	1985	No	
24053	Toyota Tom's 84C Fuji 1000 km 1984	1985	No	
24054	Peugeot 205 Turbo 16	1985	No	
24055	Subaru 4WD Turbo XT Coupe Alcyone	1985	No	
24056	Toyota Celica 2000GT-R	1985	No	
24057	Honda Today	1986	No	
24058	BMW M635 CSi	1986	No	
24059	Ferrari Testarossa	1986	No	
24060	Mazda RX-7 Savanna Limited	1986	No	
24061	BMW 635 CSi Gr. A Racing	1986	No	Rebox w/ new parts
24062	Toyota Supra 3.0 GT	1986	No	
24063	Honda Civic Si Gr. A Racing	1986	No	Rebox w/ new parts
24064	Toyota Soarer 3.0 GT Limited	1986	No	
24065	Porsche 959	1987	Yes	
24066	Mazda RX-7 Savanna Limited	1987	No	Rebox w/ new parts
24067	Subaru Alcyone 4WD VR Turbo	1987	No	Rebox w/ new parts
24068	Toyota Carina ED Autopista	1987	No	
24069	Honda City CG	1987	No	Rebox w/ new parts
24070	Porsche 911 Turbo Coupe Flatnose	1987	No	
24071	Porsche 961	1987	No	
24072	Toyota Sprinter Trueno GT-Z	1988	No	
24073	Toyota Celica FX-GT	1988	No	
24074	Mazda RX-7 Cabriolet	1988	No	Rebox w/ new parts
24075	Porsche 911 Speedster	1989	No	
24076	Toyota Supra Turbo Gr. A Racing 1987 JTCC	1988	No	Rebox w/ new parts
24077	Ferrari F40	1988	No	
24078	Nissan Silvia K's	1989	Yes	
24079	Minolta Toyota 88-CV	1989	No	
24080	Eggenberger Ford Sierra RS500 Gr. A	1989	No	
24081	Piumini Trampio Ford Sierra RS500 Gr. A	1989	No	Rebox w/ new decals
24082	Mazda MX-5 Miata	1989	No	
24083	Taka-Q Toyota 88-CV	1989	No	
24084	Jaguar XJR-9 LM	1989	No	
24085	Eunos Roadster Mazda MX-5	1989	No	
24086	Toyota Celica GT-R	1989	No	
24087	Nissan Fairlady 300ZX Turbo	1989	Yes	
24088	Nissan 180SX	1989	No	
24089	Porsche 962C From A	1989	No	
24090	Nissan Skyline GT-R	1989	No	
24091	Sauber Mercedes C9	1990	No	
24092	Peugeot 405 T16GR '89 Paris-Dakar Rally Winner	1990	No	
24093	Nissan R89C	1990	No	
24094	Peugeot 405 T16GR 1990 Paris-Dakar Rally Winner	1990	No	Rebox w/ new decals
24095	Mercedes-Benz AMG 500SL	1990	No	
24096	Toyota Celsior	1990	No	
24097	Joest Porsche 962C	1990	No	
24098	Cabin R90V Nissan	1990	No	
24099	Mercedes-Benz 500SL	1990	No	
24100	Honda NSX	1990	Yes	
24101	Acura NSX	1990	No	
24102	Calsonic Nissan Skyline GT-R Gr. A	1990	No	
24103	BMW 850i	1990	No	
24104	Ferrari Mythos	1991	No	
24105	Nissan Skyline GT-R Gr. N 1990 24 Hrs of Spa	1991	No	Rebox w/ new decals
24106	BMW 325i	1991	No	
24107	Toyota Land Cruiser 80 VX Limited	1991	No	
24108	Mitsubishi GTO Twin Turbo	1991	Yes	
24109	Nissan Skyline GT-R Gr. A JTCC 1992	1991	No	Rebox w/ new decals
24110	Efini RX-7	1992	Yes	
24111	Nissan Skyline GT-R Gr. N 1992 JTCC	1992	No	Rebox w/ new decals
24112	Mazda 787B	1992	No	
24113	Nissan Skyline GT-R Gr. A 1990 Macao GP	1992	No	Rebox w/ new decals
24114	Lexus LS400	1992	Yes	
24115	Mitsubishi Pajero Super Exceed	1992	No	
24116	Mazda RX-7 R1	1992	No	Rebox w/ new parts
24117	Nissan Skyline GT-R Gr. N 1991 Fuji 6 Hrs	1992	No	Rebox w/ new decals
24118	Mercedes-Benz 600 SEL	1992	No	
24119	Toyota Celica GT-Four 1992 Safari Rally Kenya	1993	No	
24120	Nissan 300ZX Convertible	1993	No	
24121	Mitsubishi Pajero '92 Paris Le Cap Winner	1993	No	
24122	Toyota Land Cruiser 80 with Sport Options	1993	No	Rebox w/ new parts
24123	Toyota Supra	1993	Yes	
24124	Mitsubishi Pajero with Sport Options	1993	No	Rebox w/ new parts
24125	Castrol Celica Toyota Celica GT-Four '93 Monte Carlo Rally Winner	1993	No	Rebox w/ new decals
24126	Honda NSX Type R	1993	No	Rebox w/ new parts
24127	Jeep Grand Cherokee	1993	No	
24128	AMG-Mercedes 600 SEL	1993	No	Rebox w/ new parts
24129	Jaguar XJ220	1993	No	
24130	Morris Mini Cooper Racing	1993	No	Rebox w/ new decals
24131	Toyota Celica SS-II	1993	No	
24132	Nissan Skyline 2 Door Coupe GTS 25t	1993	No	Rebox w/ new parts
24133	Toyota Celica GT-Four	1994	No	Rebox w/ new parts
24134	Mercedes-Benz S600 Coupe	1994	No	
24135	Nissan Skyline GT-R Gr. A 1993 JGTC	1994	No	Rebox w/ new decals
24136	Volkswagen 1300 Beetle	1994	Yes	
24137	Alfa Romeo 155 V6 TI Dekra	1994	No	
24138	Volkswagen Karmann Ghia 1966	1994	No	
24139	AMG-Mercedes S600 Coupe	1994	No	Rebox w/ new parts
24140	AMG Mercedes C-Class DTM ProMarkt-Zakspeed	1994	No	
24141	Ford Mustang GT Convertible	1994	No	
24142	Nissan Primera JTCC 1994	1994	No	
24143	Tabac-Original Sonax AMG Mercedes C-Class DTM	1995	No	Rebox w/ new decals
24144	Ford Escort RS Cosworth	1994	No	
24145	Nissan Skyline GT-R V Spec	1995	Yes	
24146	AMG Mercedes C-Class DTM D2	1995	No	Rebox w/ new decals
24147	Nissan Primera JTCC 1995	1995	No	Rebox w/ new decals
24148	Alfa Romeo 155 V6 TI Jägermeister	1995	No	Rebox w/ new decals
24149	Opel Calibra V6 DTM	1995	No	
24150	Jeep Wrangler Hardtop	1995	No	
24151	Jaguar MK II Saloon	1995	No	
24152	Volvo 850 Turbo Estate	1995	No	
24153	Michelin Pilot Ford Escort RS Cosworth	1995	No	Rebox w/ new decals
24154	Jeep Wrangler Open Top	1995	No	Rebox w/ new parts
24155	Toyota Tom's EXIV JTCC 1995 JTCC	1995	No	
24156	Ford Mustang Cobra R	1995	No	Rebox w/ new parts
24157	Ope Calibra "Cliff"	1995	No	Rebox w/ new decals
24158	Toyota Cerumo EXIV JTCC 1995 JTCC	1995	No	Rebox w/ new decals
24159	Jaguar Mk II Racing	1995	No	Rebox w/ new parts
24160	Ferrari F50	1995	No	
24161	Nismo Clarion GT-R LM	1995	No	Rebox w/ new decals
24162	Volvo Estate 850 BTCC	1995	No	
24163	Toyota Tom's Supra GT	1993	Yes	
24164	Citroen 2CV	1995	No	
24165	Unisia Jecs Skyline Nismo GT-R	1996	No	Rebox w/ new decals
24166	BMW Z3	1996	No	
24167	Toyota Sard Supra GT	1996	No	
24168	Volvo 850 Saloon BTCC 1995	1996	No	
24169	Fiat 500F	1996	Yes	
24170	Morgan 4/4	1996	No	
24171	Ford Escort RS Cosworth Swedish Rally 1996	1996	No	Rebox w/ new decals
24172	Alfa Romeo GTV	1996	No	
24173	Fiat Abarth 695SS	1996	No	
24174	Honda Accord VTEC JTCC	1996	No	
24175	Taisan Starcard Porsche 911 GT2	1996	No	
24176	Alfa Romeo 155 V6 TI Dekra	1996	No	Rebox w/ new decals
24177	Honda S800 Racing 1965	1997	No	
24178	Kure Nismo GT-rJGTC 1996	1996	No	Rebox w/ new decals
24179	Honda S-MX Lowdown	1997	No	
24180	JACCS Accord	1997	No	Rebox w/ new decals
24181	Sogo Keibi Porsche 911 GT2	1997	No	Rebox w/ new decals
24182	Alfa Romeo 155 V6 TI Dekra	1997	No	Rebox w/ new decals
24183	Castrol Mugen Honda Accord JTCC	1997	No	Rebox w/ new decals
24184	Calsonic Skyline GT-R JGTC 1996	1997	No	Rebox w/ new decals
24185	Alpine Renault A110 1600SC	1997	No	
24186	Porsche 911 GT1	1997	Yes	
24187	Porsche Boxster	1997	No	
24188	Alfa Romeo Sprint GTA	1997	No	
24189	Mercedes-Benz SLK	1997	No	
24190	Honda S800 Convertible	1997	No	Rebox w/ new parts
24191	Isuzu VehiCross	1997	No	
24192	Nissan R390 GT1	1997	Yes	
24193	Avex Dome Mugen NSX JGTC 1997	1997	No	
24194	Nissan Skyline 2000 GT-R Hard Top	1997	Yes	
24195	Mercedes CLK-GTR	1998	No	
24196	Porsche 911 Carrera	1998	No	
24197	Volkswagern Golf V5	1998	No	
24198	Mobil 1 NSX JGTC 1998	1998	No	Rebox w/ new decals
24199	Subaru Impreza WRC '98 Monte Carlo	1998	No	
24200	Volkswagen New Beetle	1998	No	
24201	Mercedes CLK-GTR Team CLK Sportswear	1998	No	Rebox w/ new decals
24202	Castrol Mugen NSX	1998	No	Rebox w/ new decals
24203	Mitsubishi Lancer Evolution V WRC 1998 Rallye Catalunya	1998	No	
24204	Raybrig NSX	1998	No	Rebox w/ new decals
24205	Subaru Impreza WRC '98 Safari	1998	No	Rebox w/ new decals
24206	Mercedes CLK-GTR Full View	1998	No	
24207	Ferrari F50 Yellow Version	1998	No	
24208	Porsche 911 GT1 Full View	1999	No	Rebox w/ new parts
24209	Toyota Corolla WRC	1999	No	
24210	Nissan Skyline GT-R V Spec (R34)	1999	No	
24211	Honda S2000	1999	No	
24212	Lotus Europa Special	1999	No	
24213	Mitsubishi Lancer Evolution VI	1999	No	
24214	Mercedes CLK-GTR Original-Teile	1999	No	Rebox w/ new decals
24215	Toyota Celica	1999	No	
24216	Pennzoil Nismo GT-R (R34)	1999	No	
24217	Ford Focus WRC	1999	No	
24218	Subaru Impreza WRC '99	1999	No	Rebox w/ new decals
24219	Calsonic Skyline GT-R (R34) Racer	2002	Yes	
24220	Mitsubishi Lancer Evo VI WRC 1999 Rally New Zealand	1999	No	
24221	Peugeot 206 WRC	2000	No	
24222	Toyota GT-One TS020	2000	Yes	
24223	Ferrari F50 Full View	2000	No	
24225	Loctite R34 Skyline GT-R '00	2000	No	
24226	Peugeot 206 WRC 2000 Season	2000	No	Rebox w/ new decals
24227	Subaru Impreza WRC 2000 Arai Toshihiro	2000	No	Rebox w/ new decals
24228	Ferrari 360 Modena	2000	No	
24229	Porsche 911 GT3	2001	Yes	
24230	Toyota GT-One TS020 Le Mans 1999 Full View Version	2001	No	Rebox w/ new parts
24231	Subaru Impreza WRX STI	2001	Yes	
24232	Porsche 956 Canon #14 Le Mans 1985	2001	No	Rebox w/ new decals
24233	Porsche 962C #17 Shell/Dunlop 1988	2001	No	Rebox w/ new decals
24234	Mercedes-Benz CLK DTM 2000	2001	No	
24235	Austin Mini Cooper 1275S Mk. I	2001	No	Rebox w/ new parts
24236	Peugeot 206 WRC 2001	2001	No	Rebox w/ new decals
24237	Mercedes-Benz CLK DTM 2000 Team Original Teile	2001	No	Rebox w/ new decals
24238	Ferrari 360 Spider	2001	No	
24239	Mercedes-Benz CLK DTM 2000 Team Warstiner	2001	No	Rebox w/ new decals
24240	Subaru Impreza WRC 2001	2001	No	
24241	Ford Focus WRC 01 Rally Monte Carlo 2001	2001	No	Rebox w/ new decals
24242	Ferrari 360 Modena Yellow Version	2001	No	
24243	Opel Astra V8 Coupe Team Phoenix	2001	No	
24244	Toyota Bb Dragon	2001	No	
24245	Honda S2000 (New Version)	2001	Yes	Rebox w/ new parts
24246	Nissan 350Z Fairlady	2001	No	
24247	Porsche 911 GT@ Road Version Club Sport	2002	Yes	
24248	Opel Astra V8 Coupe Team Holzer	2002	No	Rebox w/ new decals
24249	Porsche Boxster Special Edition	2002	No	Rebox w/ new parts
24250	Subaru Impreza WRC 2001 Rally Great Britain	2002	No	Rebox w/ new decals
24251	Honda Fit	2002	No	
24252	Volkswagen New Beetle	2002	No	Rebox
24253	Honda Fit (Jazz)	2002	No	Rebox w/ new parts
24254	Nissan 350Z Track	2002	No	Rebox w/ new parts
24255	Peugeot 206 WRC 2002 Tour De Corse	2002	No	Rebox w/ new decals
24257	Mitsubishi Lancer Evo VII WRC	2002	No	
24258	Nissan Skyline GT-R V-Spec II (R34)	2002	No	Rebox w/ new parts
24259	Subaru Impreza WRC 2002	2002	No	Rebox w/ new parts
24260	Enzo Ferrari	2002	No	
24261	Ford Focus WRC 02 Rally France/Deutschland 2002	2002	No	Rebox w/ new decals
24262	Peugeot 206 WRC 2002 Winner Version	2003	No	Rebox w/ new decals
24263	Mercedes-Benz CLK DTM Finished Body	2003	No	Rebox w/ new parts
24264	Porsche 911 GT1 Finished Body	2003	No	Rebox w/ new parts
24265	Opel Astra V8 Coupe Team Phoenix Finished Body	2004	No	Rebox w/ new parts
24267	Peugeot 206 WRC Version 2003	2003	No	Rebox w/ new decals
24268	Xanavi Nismo GT-R (R34)	2003	No	Rebox w/ new parts
24269	BMW 320I Gr.5 Jägermeister	2003	No	Rebox w/ new decals
24270	Enzo Ferrari Yellow Version	2003	No	
24271	Xanavi Nismo GT-R (R34) Special Edition	2004	No	Rebox w/ new decals
24272	Calsonic Skyline GT-R 2003	2004	No	Rebox w/ new decals
24273	Enzo Ferrari Full View	2004	No	
24274	Ford Zakspeed Capri Gr. 5	2004	No	Rebox w/ new decals
24275	Porsche Carrera GT	2004	Yes	
24276	Subaru Impreza WRC Rally Japan 2004	2004	No	Rebox w/ new decals
24277	Xanavi Nismo Z	2004	No	
24278	Alpine Renault A110 Monte Carlo '71	2005	No	Rebox w/ new parts
24279	Porsche 911 Turbo '88	2005	No	
24280	Calsonic Impul Z	2005	No	Rebox w/ new decals
24281	Subaru Impreza WRC Monte Carlo '05	2005	No	Rebox w/ new decals
24282	Nismo R34 GT-R Z Tune	2005	Yes	Rebox w/ new parts
24283	Bozian Racing Peugeot 206 WRC - Monte Carlo '05	2005	No	Rebox w/ new decals
24284	Ferrari F40 Competizione MonteShell	2005	No	Rebox w/ new parts
24285	Peugeot 307 WRC 2005	2005	No	
24286	Raybrig NSX 2005	2006	No	Rebox w/ new decals
24287	Epson NSX 2005	2006	No	Rebox w/ new decals
24288	Arta NSX 2005	2006	No	Rebox w/ new decals
24289	Toyota Tom's 84C	2006	No	Rebox
24290	Mercedes-Benz SLR McLaren	2006	Yes	
24291	Takata Dome NSX 2005	2006	No	Rebox w/ new decals
24292	Ferrari FXX	2006	No	
24293	Open Interface Tom's SC430 2006	2007	No	
24294	Mobil 1 SC 2006	2007	No	Rebox w/ new decals
24295	Ferrari F40	2007	No	Rebox
24296	Ferrari F50	2007	No	
24297	Ferrari F50 Yellow Version	2007	No	
24298	Ferrari 360 Modena	2006	No	Rebox
24299	Ferrari 360 Modena Yellow Version	2006	Yes	Rebox
24300	Nissan GT-R	2008	Yes	-
24301	Ferrari "Enzo Ferrari" (yellow)	2007	No	Rebox from X
24302	Ferrari "Enzo Ferrari" (red)	2007	No	Rebox from X
24303	Zent Cerumo SC 2006	2007	Yes	Rebox from X with new decals
24304	Fairlady Z Version Nismo	2007	Yes	Rebox from X with new parts
24305	Lamborghini Countach LP400	2007	Yes	Rebox from X with new parts
24306	Lamborghini countach LP500S	2008	Yes	Rebox from X with new parts
24307	Ferrari 360 Spider	2008	No	Rebox from X with new parts
24308	Xanavi Nismo GT-R (R35)	2008	Yes	-
24309	Canon Porsche 956	2008	No	Rebox from X with new parts
24310	Sauber-Mercedes C9 1988	2008	No	Rebox from X with new parts
24311	Porsche 935 "Martini"	2010	No	Rebox from X with new parts
24312	Calsonic Impul GT-R (R35)	2008	No	Rebox from X with new parts
24313	Porsche 962C Le Mans 24 Hours 1990 Repsol Brun Motorsport Team	2009	No	Rebox from X with new decals
24314	Porsche 956 "Kenwood" 1984 LeMans 24 Hours	2009	No	Rebox from X with new parts
24315	Nissan 370Z Fairlady Z	2009	Yes	-
24316	Aston Martin DBS	2010	Yes	-
24317	Mercedes-Benz SLR McLaren "722 Edition"	2010	Yes	Rebox from X with new parts
24318	Porsche 935/78 Moby Dick "Martini"	2010	No	Rebox from X with new parts
24319	Lexus LFA	2011	Yes	-
24320	Porsche 961 Le Mans 24 Hours 1986	2011	No	Rebox from X with new parts
24321	Honda NSX Type R	2011	No	Rebox
24322	BMW 635 CSi Jägermeister	2012	No	Rebox w/ new decals
24323	Toyota 86	2012	No	
24324	Subaru BRZ	2014	No	
24325	Lexus LFA Full View	2012	No	
24326	Mazda 787B #18 Le Mans 24 Hours 1991	2012	No	Rebox w/ new decals
24327	Enzo Ferrari	2013	No	Rebox
24328	Porsche Turbo RSR Type 934 Jägermeister	2013	No	
24329	Ford Zakspeed Turbo Capri Gr.5 Wurth	2013	No	Rebox w/ new decals
24330	Porsche Carrera GT Full View	2013	No	Rebox w/ new parts
24331	Mercedes-Benz SLR McLaren Full View	2013	No	Rebox w/ new parts
24332	Toyota Hi-Ace Quick Delivery	2013	No	Rebox w/ new decals
24333	Ferrari LaFerrari	2013	No	
24334	Porsche 934 Turbo RSR Vaillant	2014	No	
24335	Nissan skyline 2000 GT-R Street Custom	2014	No	
24336	Subaru BRZ Street-Custom	2012	No	
24337	Gazoo Racing TRD 86 (2013 TRD Rally Challenges)	2014	No	
24338	Mercedes-Benz 300SL	2015	No	
24339	Toyoda Model AA	2015	No	
24340	Honda S600	2015	Yes	
24341	Nissan Skyline GT-R NiSMO Custom	2015	Yes	Rebox with new parts
24342	MAZDA ROADSTER MAZDA MX-5	2015	Yes	
24343	Ferrari FXX K Ferrari Finali Mondiali	2016	No	
24344	NSX	2016	Yes	
24345	Mercedes-Benz AMG GT3	2017	Yes	
24346	Ford GT	2019	Yes	
24347	LaFerrari - Yellow	2018	Yes	Rebox
24348	370Z, Heritage Edition Fairlady Z	2018	Yes	
24349	Toyota GAZOO Racing TS050 Hybrid	2019	Yes	
24350	Mercedes Benz LEON CVSTOS AMG GT3 Super GT - GT 300 Champion	2019	Yes	Rebox from X with new parts
24351	Toyota GR Supra	2019	Yes	
24352	Mazda 787B	2019	No	Rebox from X with new decals
24353	Mazda Roadster RF	2020	Yes	Rebox from X with new parts
24354	Ford Mustang GT4	2020	Yes	
24355	McLaren Senna	2021	Yes	
24356	Campus Friends Set II	2020	Yes	
24357	Lotus Super 7 Series II	2020	Yes	Rebox from X with new parts
24358	Lotus Europa Special	2020	Yes	Rebox from X with new parts
24359	1989 Sauber-Mercedes C9	2021	Yes	Rebox from X with new decals
24360	Nissan Fairlady 240ZG	2021	Yes	
24361	Toyota GR 86	2021	Yes	-
24362	Subaru BRZ (ZD8)	2021	Yes	Rebox from X with new parts
24363	Nissan Z	2022	Yes	-
24364	GMA T.50	2023	Yes	New tool
24365	Toyota Soarer 2000VR-Turbo	2024	Yes	Rebox from x with new decals
24366	"Full view" Mercedes	2024	Yes	Rebox
24367	Nissan Fairlady 240Z Street-Custom	2024	Yes	Rebox from 24360 with new parts
24368	Renault 5 Turbo	2024	Yes	Rebox from 24024 with new decals
24369	Honda City Turbo with Honda Motocompo	2025	Yes	Rebox from SS2426 with new parts
24370	Porsche 911 GT3 RS (992) (Item 24370)	2025	Yes	New tool
24371	Toyota GR Supra Custom	2025	Yes	Rebox from 24341 with new parts
24372	Porsche 962C Jägermeister	2025	Yes	Rebox from 24089 with new decals
24373	Honda Prelude (BF1)	2025	Yes	New tool
24374	Nissan Skyline 2000 Turbo GT-E.S	2025	Yes	Rebox from XXX with new decals
24375	Mazda Savanna RX-7	2025	Yes	Rebox from XXX with new decals
24376	1978 Ford Zakspeed Capri Turbo	2026	Yes	Rebox from XXX with new decals
24377	Toyota Celica LB Turbo Gr.5	2026	Yes	Rebox from XXX with new decals
24378	Nissan Leopard 2-Door Hardtop 280X-SF-L	2026	Yes	Rebox from XXX with new decals
24379	BMW 320i Racing	2026	Yes	Rebox
24380

*This list is updated from info on www.scalemates.com

=== 1/20 Grand Prix collection ===
List of all Tamiya 1/20 Grand Prix collection
Kit number	Model	Release year	In production	Comment
20001	Tyrrell P34 Six Wheeler 1976	1977	No	-
20002	McLaren M23	1977	No	-
20003	Porsche 928	1977	No	-
20004	Team Lotus J.P.S.Mk.III	1978	No	-
20005	"Martini" Porsche 935 Turbo 1976	1977	No	-
20006	Wolf WR-1 Ford	1978	No	-
20007	Brabham BT46 Alfa Romeo	1979	No	-
20008	Kremer Porsche 935 Turbo	1978	No	-
20009	Toyota Celica LB Turbo Gr.5	1978	No	-
20010	Ferrari F312T3	1980	No	-
20011	Racing Pit Team	1980	No	-
20012	Ligier JS11 Ford	1980	No	-
20013	Fiat 131 Abarth Rally	1979	No	-
20014	Williams FW-07	1980	No	-
20015	Fiat 131 Monte-Carlo Winner	1987	No	Rebox from 20013 with new decals
20016	Porsche 928S	1987	No	Rebox from 20003
20017	Brabham BT50 BMW Turbo 1982	1991	No	-
20018	Renault RE 30B Turbo 1982	1987	No	-
20019	Williams FW-11 Honda	1991	No	
20020	Lotus Honda 99T	1988	No	-
20021	Benetton Ford B188	1988	No	-
20022	McLaren MP4/4	1989	No	-
20023	Ferrari F189 Early Version	1989	No	-
20024	Ferrari F189 Portuguese G.P.	1991	No	Rebox from 20023 with new parts
20025	"Canon" Williams FW13B Renault 1990	1990	No	-
20026	McLaren MP4/5B Honda	1991	No	-
20027	Driver & Tech. Engineer Set	1991	-	-
20028	Leyton House CG901B	-	-	-
20029	Braun Tyrrell Honda 020	-	-	-
20030	Lotus Type 102B	1992	-	-
20031	Tyre Changing Pit Crew	-	-	-
20032	Jordan 191	-	-	-
20033	Lotus Ford 102D (Herbert)	-	-	-
20034	Lotus Ford 102D (Hakkinen)	-	-	-
20035	McLaren MP4/7	-	-	-
20036	Benetton Ford B192	-	-	-
20037	Lotus 107 Ford	-	-	-
20038	Lotus 107B Ford	-	-	-
20039	McLaren MP4/8	-	-	-
20040	Newman Haas K Mart Texaco Lola T93/00 Ford	1994	No	-
20041	Dick Simon Duracell Mobil 1 Sadia Lola T93/00 Ford	-	No	-
20042	Tyrrell Yamaha 023	-	-	-
20043	Honda F1 RA272	-	-	-
20044	Lotus 25 Coventry Climax	-	-	-
20045	Ferrari F310B	-	No	-
20046	McLaren MP4/13	-	No	-
20047	McLaren MP4/13 Japanese GP	-	No	-
20048	Ferrari F1-2000	-	No	-
20049	Ferrari F1-2000 (Clear Cowl)	-	No	-
20050	Brabham BT-46 Alfa Romeo (Clear Cowl)	2003	-	Rebox with new parts
20051	Ferrari 312T3 (Clear Cowl)	-	No	-
20052	Ferrari F2001	-	No	-
20053	Tyrrell P34 1977 Monaco GP	-	-	-
20054	Ferrari F2001 (Clear Cowl)	-	No	-
20055	WilliamsF1 BMW FW24	-	-	-
20056	Full-View WilliamsF1 BMW FW24 Italian GP 2002	-	-	-
20057	Lotus 99T Honda	-	-	-
20058	Tyrrell P34 Six Wheeler 1976 Japan GP (w/Photo-Etched Parts)	2010	Yes	Rebox with new parts
20059	Ferrari F60	2009	No	-
20060	Lotus Type 79 1978	2010	Yes	-
20061	"Martini" Lotus 79 Ford 1979	2010	Yes	Rebox with new parts
20062	McLaren M23 Ford 1976	2011	-	Rebox with new parts
20063	Motorsports Team Set (1970–1985)	2011	-	Rebox with new parts
20064	Wolf WR1 1977	2010	-	Rebox with new parts
20065	Lotus 78	2011	-	Rebox with new parts
20066	Porsche 928	2012	-	Rebox with new parts
20067	Red Bull Racing RB6	2012	No	-
20068	Ferrari SF70H	2018	No	Tamiya lost all Ferrari license in 2020
20069	FIAT 131 ABARTH RALLY OLIO FIAT	2020	Yes	Rebox with new decals
20070	Martini Porsche 935 Turbo	2020	Yes	Rebox with new decals
20071	Porsche 935 Vaillant	2023	Yes	Rebox with new decals
20072	Toyota Celica LB Turbo Gr.5	2023	-	Rebox with new decals

=== 1/12 big scale racing car series ===
List of all Tamiya 1/12 Big Scale Racing Cars
Kit number	Model	Release year	In production	Comment
12001	Honda F-1 (RA 273) 1967	1967	No	-
12002	Lotus 49 Ford F-1 1967	1968	No	-
12003	Porsche 910 Carrera 10 1967	1968	No	-
12004	Lotus 49B Ford F-1 1968	1969	No	-
12005	Matra MS11 1968	1969	No	-
12006	Lola T-70 MkIII 1967	1970	No	-
12007	Ferrari 312 B 1970	1971	No	-
12008	Datsun 240Z Safari Car	1972	No	-
12009	"Elf" Tyrrell Ford F-1 (003) 1971	1973	No	-
12010	Datsun 240ZG	1973	No	Rebox
12011	Honda F-1 (RA 273) 1967	1973	No	Rebox
12012	Lotus 49 Ford F-1 1967	1973	No	Rebox
12013	John Player Special J.P.S. Lotus 72D (Ford) 1972	1973	No	-
12014	Porsche 910 Carrera 10 1967	1974	No	Rebox
12015	Lola T-70 MkIII 1967	1974	No	Rebox
12016	Texaco Marlb*** M23 (McLaren Ford) 1974	1974	No	-
12017	Yardley McLaren M23 (Ford) 1974	1975	No	Rebox
12018	Brabham Martini BT44B 1975	1975	No	-
12019	Ferrari 312T 1975	1976	No	-
12020	Porsche Turbo RSR Type 934 1976	1976	No	-
12021	Tyrrell P34 Six Wheeler "Elf Team Tyrrell" 1976	1977	No	-
12022	Team Lotus J.P.S. Mk.III (Lotus 78 Ford) 1977	1977	No	-
12023	Martini Porsche 935 Turbo 1976	1977	No	-
12024	Wolf WR1 Ford F1 1977	1978	No	-
12025	Ferrari 312 T4 (Big Scale Series No. 25)	1980	No	-
12026	Renault RE 20 Turbo 1980	1981	No	-
12027	Ferrari 641/2 (F190) 1990	1991	No	-
12028	McLaren MP4/6 Honda 1991	1991	No	-
12029	"Canon" Williams FW 14B Renault	1992	No	-
12030	Ferrari 641/2 (F190) (full view version) 1990	1993	No	Rebox
12031	Rover Mini Cooper 1.3i 1991	1995	No	-
12032	Honda RA273 (w/PE Parts) 1967	2006	No	Rebox
12033	Renault RE-20 Turbo (w/PE Parts) 1979	2007	No	Rebox
12034	Ferrari 312T 1975 Champion Car (w/PE Parts)	2008	No	Rebox
12035	Ferrari 312T4 1979 Champion Car (with PE parts)	2008	No	Rebox
12036	Tyrrell P34 Six Wheeler (w/PE Parts). "Elf Team Tyrrell" 1976	2008	No	Rebox
12037	Lotus Type 78 (w/PE Parts) 1977	2008	No	Rebox
12038	Porsche 935 "Martini" 1976	2009	No	Rebox
12039	Tyrrell 003 (w/PE Parts) 1971	2009	No	Rebox
12040	Porsche Turbo RSR Type 934 Jägermeister (w/PE Parts) 1976	2008	No	Rebox
12041	Porsche 910 1967 World Sportscar Championship Winner	2010	No	Rebox
12042	Martini Brabham BT44B 1975 (w/PE Parts)	2010	No	Rebox
12043	Lola T70 Mk III (w/PE Parts) 1967	2011	No	Rebox
12044	Wolf WR1 1977 (w/PE Parts) Ford	2010	No	Rebox
12045	McLaren M23 1974 w/Photo-Etched Parts	2011	No	Rebox
12046	Team Lotus Type 72D 1972	2012	Yes	Rebox, Released in 2023
12047	Enzo Ferrari	2012	No	Rebox
12048	Ferrari 312B w/Photo-Etched Parts	2012	No	Rebox
12049	Yardley McLaren M23 (w/PE Parts) 1974	2012	No	Rebox
12050	Porsche Carrera GT	2013	Yes	-
12051	Nissan Fairlady 240ZG Street-Custom	2014	No	-
12052	TEAM LOTUS Type 49 1967 (w/PHOTO-ETCHED PARTS)	2014	No	-
12053	Team Lotus type 49B with Etched Parts	2015	No	-
12054	TYRRELL 003 1971 MONACO GP (w/PHOTO-ETCHED PARTS)	2015	No	-
12055	Porsche Turbo RSR 934 Jägermeister (w/Photo-Etched Parts)	2019	Yes	Rebox from X with new decals
12056	Porsche 934 Vaillant 1976 DRM Series Entrant	2020	Yes	Rebox from X with new decals
12057	Porsche 935 Martini 1976 World Championship for Makes Champion	2020	Yes	Rebox from X with new decals

== Motorcycles ==
Tamiya has an extensive line of 1/12 scale street and Grand Prix racing motorcycles. A few 1/6 scale kits have also been made.

=== 1/12 motorcycles ===
Considering the number of produced motorcycle kits, Tamiya has been dominating the 1/12 scale since it started to design kits in the early 80s.

Tamiya has designed various kits and versions of the following motorcycles:

- Ducati: 900SS, 916, Desmosedici, Superleggera V4,
- Honda: RC166, CB750F, CB900F2, CB1100R, CX500, VT250F, VF750F, CR450R, CR450R, NSR250, NSR500, CBR400F, VFR750R, CBR 1100XX, RC211V, RC213V
- Suzuki: RGB500, GSX750S
- Yamaha: RZ250, RZ350, Beluga 500, XV1000, XV1600, YZF-R1, FZ250, SRX-6, FZR750R, YZR500,
- Kawasaki: KR1000F, KR500, GPZ400R
- KTM: xxx

List of all Tamiya 1/12 Motorcycles
Kit number	Model	Release year	In production	Comment
14001	Yamaha YZR500 Grand Prix Racer	1981	No	Reboxed in 2017
14002	Yamaha RZ250	-	No	-
14003	Suzuki RGB500 Grand Prix Racer	-	No	-
14004	Yamaha RZ350	-	No	-
14005	Yamaha Scooter Beluga 500	-	Yes	-
14006	Honda CB750F	-	Yes	-
14007	Honda CB900F2 Bol d'Or	-	No	-
14008	Honda CB1100R	-	No	-
14009	Suzuki RGB500 Team Gallina	-	No	-
14010	Suzuki GSX1100S Katana	1983	Yes	-
14011	Honda CR250R Motocrosser	-	No	-
14012	Kawasaki KR1000F Endurance Racer	-	No	-
14013	Suzuki RM250 Motocrosser	-	No	-
14014	Honda RS1000 Endurance Racer	-	No	-
14015	Suzuki GSX750S	-	No	-
14016	Honda CX500 Turbo	-	No	-
14017	Honda VT250F	-	No	-
14018	Honda CR450R Motocrosser	-	No	-
14019	Ducati 900 Mike Hailwood Replica	-	No	-
14020	Suzuki GSX750 Police Bike	1984	No	-
14021	Honda VF750F	-	No	-
14022	Ducati 900 NCR Racer	-	No	-
14023	Honda MVX250F	-	No	-
14024	Suzuki RG250 Gamma	1984	No	-
14025	Ducati 900SS	-	No	-
14026	Kenny Roberts & the Yamaha YZR500	-	No	-
14027	Jumping RIDER	-	No	-
14028	Kawasaki KR500 Grand Prix Racer	-	No	-
14029	Suzuki RG250 Gamma Full Option	-	No	-
14030	Honda VT250F Integra	1984	No	--
14031	Honda VF750F Fully Cowl	-	No	-
14032	Honda NS500 Grand Prix Racer	-	No	-
14033	Racing Rider	-	No	-
14034	Suzuki GSX750S New Katana	1985	Yes	-
14035	Honda CBR400F	-	Yes	-
14036	BMW K100	-	No	-
14037	Yamaha RZV500R	-	Yes	-
14038	Yamaha YZR500 (OW70)	-	-	-
14039	Honda CBR400F Endurance	-	-	-
14040	Straight Run Rider	1986	-	-
14041	Starting Rider	-	-	-
14042	Honda NS500 With Starting Rider	-	-	-
14043	Yamaha YZR500 (OW70)& Straight Run Rider	-	-	-
14044	Yamaha XV1000 Virago	-	-	-
14045	Kawasaki GPZ400R	-	-	-
14046	KTM250 Motocrosser	-	-	-
14047	Yamaha FZ250 Phazer	-	-	-
14048	Yamaha SRX-6	-	-	-
14049	BMW R80 G/S '85 Paris Dakar Rally Winner	-	-	-
14050	Honda NS500 With Racing Figure	1987	-	-
14051	KTM250MX With Motocross Rider	-	-	-
14052	Yamaha XV1000 Virago With Touring Rider	-	-	-
14053	Suzuki RG250 Gamma Walter Wolf Version	-	-	-
14054	Honda NXR750 86 Paris Dakar Rally Winner	-	-	-
14055	Honda NSR500 Grand Prix Racer	-	-	-
14056	BMW R80 G/S With Paris Dakar Rider	-	-	-
14057	Honda VFR750R	1989	-	-
14058	Yamaha FZR750R (0W01)	-	-	-
14059	Honda NSR250 Repsol	-	No	-
14060	Honda NR	1993	No	-
14061	Cup Noodle Honda NSR250	-	No	-
14062	Bimota Tesi 1D 906SR	-	No	-
14063	Ducati 888 Superbike Racer	1994	-	-
14064	Yamaha TZ250M (T Harada's 93 GP-2 Bike)	-	-	-
14065	Suzuki GSX1100S Katana Custom Tuned	-	-	-
14066	Honda CB750F Custom Tuned	-	-	-
14067	'94 Yamaha TZ250M	-	-	-
14068	Ducati 916	-	-	-
14069	Moto Guzzi V10 Centauro	-	-	-
14070	Honda CDR1100XX Super Blackbird	1998	Yes	-
14071	Repsol Honda NSR500 '98	-	No	-
14072	Moviestar Honda Pons NSR500 '98	-	No	-
14073	Yamaha YZF-R1	1999	Yes	-
14074	Yamaha YZF-R1 Taira Racing	-	Yes	-
14075	Yamaha YZR500 (OW70) Taira Version	-	No	-
14076	Red Bull Yamaha WCM YZR500 '99	-	No	-
14077	Repsol Honda '99	-	No	-
14078	Antena 3 Yamaha D'Antin YZR500	-	No	-
14079	Honda CBR1100XX Super Blackbird "With Me"	-	No	-
14080	Yamaha XV1600 Road Star	2000	-	-
14081	Suzuki RGv Gamma (XR89)	-	-	-
14082	Nastro Azzurzo Honda NSR500	-	No	-
14083	Telefónica Movistar Suzuki RGV '00	-	No	-
14084	Kawasaki Ninja ZX-12R	2002	Yes	-
14085	"Full View" Yamaha YZF-R1 Taira Racing	-	-	-
14086	Tech 3 Yamaha YZR500 '01	-	No	-
14087	Honda Pons NSR500 '01	-	No	-
14088	Factory Yamaha YZR500 '01	-	No	-
14089	Telefónica Movistar Suzuki RGv Gamma '01	-	No	-
14090	Suzuki Hayabusa 1300 (GSX 1300R)	2002	Yes	-
14091	Antena 3 Yamaha D'Antin YZR500 '02	-	No	-
14092	Repsol Honda RC211V	-	No	-
14093	Yoshimura Hayabusa X-1	-	-	-
14094	Telefónica Movistar Honda RC211V '03	-	No	-
14095	Team Honda Pons RC211V '03	-	No	-
14096	Repsol Honda RC211V '03	2003	No	Rebox
14097	Repsol Honda RC211V '03 Valencia	-	No	-
14098	Yamaha YZR-M1 '04 (No.46/No.47)	-	No	-
14099	Repsol Honda RC211V '03	-	No	-
14100	Yamaha YZR-M1 No.7/33	2005	Yes	Fork update
14101	Ducati Desmosedici	-	Yes	-
14102	Akai Yamaha YZR 500	-	No	-
14103	Dantin Pramac Ducati GP4	-	No	-
14104	Yamaha YZR-M1 50th Anniversary U.S. Intercoloring Edition	-	No	-
14105	Yamaha YZR-M1 50th Anniversary Valencia Edition	-	No	-
14106	Repsol Honda RC211V 06	2006	No	-
14107	Konica Minolta Honda RC211V	-	No	-
14108	LCR Honda RC211 V´06	-	No	-
14109	Kawasaki Ninja ZX-RR	-	Yes	-
14110	Ajinomoto Honda NSR 250	2009	-	-
14111	Kawasaki ZZR 1400	-	Yes	-
14112	Kawasaki Ninja ZX-14 Special Color Edition	-	No	-
14113	Honda RC166 GP Racer	-	-	-
14114	Yamaha YZR-M1 50th Anniversary U.S. Intercoloring Edition No.46	-	No	-
14115	Yamaha YZR-M1 50th Anniversary Valencia Edition No.46	-	No	Rebox
14116	Yamaha YZR-M1 ´05 No.46/No.5	-	No	-
14117	Yamaha YZR-m1 ´09 Fiat Yamaha Team	2011	No	-
14118	Valentino Rossi Figure	-	No	-
14119	Yamaha YZR-M1 ´09 Monster Yamaha Tech 3	-	No	Rebox
14120	Yamaha YZR-M1 ´09 Fiat Yamaha Team (Estoril Edition)	2012	No	Rebox
14121	Honda NSR500 ´84	-	-	-
14122	Racing Rider	-	-	-
14123	Straight Run Rider	-	-	-
14124	Starting Rider	-	-	-
14125	Honda NS500 ´84	-	-	-
14126	“Full-View” Honda NSR500 ´84	-	-	Rebox from X with new parts
14127	“Full-View” Honda RC166 GP Racer	-	-	-
14128	“Full-View” Yamaha YZR-M1 ´09 Fiat Yamaha Team	2013	No	Rebox from X with new parts
14129	Ducati 1199 Panigale S	2014	Yes	Fork update
14130	Repsol Honda RC213V ´14	2016	Yes	Fork update
14131	Kawasaki Ninja H2R	2016	Yes	-
14132	Ducati 1199 Panigale S Tricolore	2017	Yes	Rebox from 14129 with new decals
14133	Yamaha YZF-R1M	2018	Yes	Fork update
14134	Honda Monkey 125	2019	-	-
14135	Yamaha XV1600 Road Star Custom	2019	Yes	Rebox from 14080 with new parts
14136	Kawasaki Ninja H2 Carbon	2020	Yes	Rebox from 14131 with new parts
14137	Street Rider - 14137	2019	Yes	-
14138	CBR1000RR-R Fireblade SP	2020	Yes	Fork upgrade
14139	Team Suzuki ECSTAR GSX-RR '20	2021	Yes	Fork upgrade
14140	Ducati Superleggera V4	2022	Yes	-
14141	Honda CBR1000RR-R FIREBLADE SP 30th Anniversary	2023	Yes	Rebox from 14138 with new decals
14142	Honda Dax 125 Tamiya Limited Edition	2024	Yes	-
14143	Ducati Superleggera V4 with Racing Kit	2025	Yes	Rebox from 14140 with new parts
14144	Honda CB1000F	2026	Yes	-

=== 1/6 big scale motorcycles series ===
List of all Tamiya 1/6 Motorcycles
Kit number	Model	Release year	In production	Comment
16001	Honda CB750 FOUR	1970	No	Reboxed several times
16002	Dax Honda Export 70	1971	No	-
16003	Honda CB750 Racing Type	1971	No	-
16004	Honda CB750 Police Type 1969	1972	No	-
16005	BMW R75/5 1970	1973	No	-
16006	BMW R75/5 Police Type 1970	1974	No	Rebox from 16005 with new parts
16007	AMF Harley-Davidson FLH	1974	No	-
16008	BMW R90S 1973	1975	No	-
16009	Harley-Davidson FLH1200 Police Bike 1973	1976	No	Rebox with new parts
16010	Harley-Davidson FXE1200 Super Glide 1971	1977	No	-
16011	Yamaha Motocrosser YZ250 1974	1977	No	-
16012	Honda Gorilla Z50J-III 1978	1980	No	-
16013	Honda Monkey Z50J-I	1978	No	Reboxed several times
16014	Honda MB50Z 1979	1981	No	-
16015	Harley-Davidson FLH Classic 1979	1981	No	Rebox with new parts
16016	Harley-Davidson FLH1200 Police Bike 1973	1981	No	Rebox from 1974
16017	Yamaha XS1100LG Midnight Special 1979	1981	No	-
16018	Harley-Davidson FLH Classic with Sidecar 1979	1981	No	Rebox with new parts
16019	Kawasaki Z1300	1981	-	-
16020	Honda CB750F	1982	-	-
16021	Kawasaki KZ1300B Touring	1982	No	Rebox
16022	Honda CB1100R	1982	No	-
16023	Kawasaki Z1300 Motorcycle Engine	1983	No	Rebox with new parts
16024	Honda CB750F Motorcycle Engine	1983	No	-
16025	Suzuki GSX1100S Katana	1983	-	-
16026	Honda CX500 Turbo	1983	No	-
16027	Honda CX500 Turbo Motorcycle Engine	1984	No	Rebox
16028	Honda Magna 50	1997	No	-
16029	Harley-Davidson FLSTF Fat Boy	1997	No	-
16030	Honda Monkey 2000 Anniversary	2001	-	Rebox from 16013
16031	Honda Gorilla Spring Collection 1999	2001	No	Rebox from 16013 with new parts
16032	Honda MONKEY "40th Anniversary"	2009	-	Rebox from 16013
16033	Honda CB1100R(B)	2009	-	Rebox from 16022
16034	Yamaha XS1100LG Midnight Special 1982	2009	-	Rebox from 16017
16035	Honda CX500 Turbo	2011	No	Rebox from 1982
16036	Yamaha Motocrosser YZ250	2012	No	Rebox with new parts
16037	Harley Davidson FLH Classic - Black	2013	-	-
16038	Harley Davidson FLH1200 - Police Bike	2013	-	-
16039	Harley Davidson FXE1200 - Super Glide	2013	-	-
16040	Harley Davidson FLH Classic	2013	No	Rebox
16041	Harley-Davidson FLSTFB Fat Boy Lo	2013	No	-
16042	Honda CRF1000L Africa Twin	2017	Yes	-

== Ship models ==
Tamiya produces many naval ship models in 1/350 and 1/700 scale and in both full and waterline versions. Full versions offer full hulls whereas waterline versions have flat bottoms, representing only the portion seen above the waterline giving the impression that the ship is floating when placed on a surface, which is more convenient in creating dioramas.

=== 1/350 ships ===
The list of 1/350 ships include the Yamato, Musashi, Bismarck, Tirpitz, USS New Jersey, USS Enterprise, HMS Prince of Wales, and more recent additions mainly on WW2 Japanese warships such as the Tone, Mogami, Mikuma, Yukikaze, and I-400 submarine.

List of all Tamiya 1/350 Ships
Kit number	Model	Release year	In production	Comment
78001	German Battleship Bismarck	1978	No	-
78002	Japanese Battleship Yamato	1979	No	-
78003	German Battleship Tirpitz	1980	No	Rebox from 78001 with new parts
78004	Japanese Battleship Musashi	1981	No	Rebox from 78002 with new parts
78005	US Battleship USS New Jersey BB-62	1984	No	-
78006	U.S. Aircraft Set	1985	Yes	-
78007	U.S. Aircraft Carrier CVN-65 Enterprise	1984	Yes	-
78008	U.S. Battleship BB-63 USS Missouri	1984	No	-
78009	U.S. Aircraft Set No.2	1985	Yes	-
78010	British Battleship King George V	1985	No	-
78011	British Battleship Prince of Wales	1986	No	Rebox from 78010 with new parts
78012	US Navy Destroyer USS Fletcher DD-445	1996	No	-
78013	German Battleship Bismarck	2005	No	Rebox from 78001
78014	Japanese Battleship Yamato 大和	2005	No	Rebox from 78002
78015	German Battleship Tirpitz	2005	No	Rebox from 78003
78016	IJN Battleship Musashi	2005	No	Rebox from 78004
78017	USS New Jersey US Battleship BB-62	2005	No	Rebox from 78005
78018	U.S. Battleship BB-63 Missouri	2005	Yes	Rebox from 78008
78019	Japanese Navy Submarine I-400	2007	Yes	Wooden deck upgrade
78020	Japanese Navy Destroyer IJN Yukikaze	2008	Yes	PE upgrade
78021	Japanese Aircraft Carrying Cruiser IJN Mogami	2009	Yes	-
78022	Japanese Light Cruiser 三隈 Mikuma	2009	Yes	Rebox from 78021 with new parts
78023	Japanese Heavy Cruiser 最上 Mogami	2010	Yes	Rebox from 78021 with new parts
78024	Japanese Heavy Cruiser 利根 Tone	2011	Yes	-
78025	Japanese Battleship Yamato Premium Ed. inc. PE Parts	2011	Yes	Wooden deck upgrade
78026	WWII Japanese Navy Utility Boat Set	2011	Yes	-
78027	Japanese Heavy Cruiser Chikuma	2012	Yes	Rebox from 78024 with new parts
78028	US Battleship USS New Jersey BB-62	2012	Yes	Rebox from 78005 with new parts
78029	USS BB-63 Missouri 1991(Includes PE & Booklet)	2012	Yes	Rebox from 78008 with new parts
78030	Japanese Battleship Yamato	2013	Yes	Rebox from 78002 with new parts
78031	Japanese Battleship Musashi 武蔵	2013	Yes	Rebox from 78004 with new parts
78032	Japanese Navy Destroyer Kagero	2015	Yes	Rebox from 78020 with new parts

=== 1/700 waterline ===
The majority of the kits in the 1/700 waterline series are WWII Imperial Japanese Navy ships but there are also kits of WWII ships from other countries such as Germany, Britain, and the United States.

The 1/700 waterline series battleship U.S.S. Missouri is 386.5 mm (15.2 inches) long with 1/350 battleships twice as long.

In addition the series has a few modern vessels such as the vehicle transport ship Shimokita with a transparent deck to allow viewing of the loaded hovercraft, tanks and trucks inside.

List of all Tamiya 1/700 Waterline series
Kit number	Model	Release year	In production	Comment
31003	JMSDF Defense Ship LST-4001 Ohsumi	1999	Yes	-
31006	JMSDF Defense Ship LST-4002 Shimokita	2001	Yes	Rebox with new parts
31113	Japanese Battleship Yamato	1998	No	-
31114	Battleship Musashi 武蔵	1998	No	Rebox from 31113 with new parts
31210	Japanese Aircraft Carrier Shinano	1992	Yes	Rebox with new parts
31211	Japanese Aircraft Carrier Taiho 大鳳	1992	Yes	Rebox with new parts
31212	Japanese Aircraft Carrier Junyo	1992	Yes	Rebox with new parts
31213	Japanese Aircraft Carrier Shokaku 翔鶴	1993	Yes	-
31214	Japanese Aircraft Carrier Zuikaku 瑞鶴	1993	Yes	Rebox with new parts
31215	Japanese Aircraft Carrier Shinano	1999	Yes	-
31314	Japanese Light Cruiser Agano	1992	Yes	Rebox with new parts
31315	Japanese Light Cruiser Yahagi	-	Yes	-
31316	Japanese Light Cruiser Kuma	-	Yes	-
31317	Japanese Light Cruiser Tama	-	Yes	-
31318	Japanese Light Cruiser Kiso	-	Yes	-
31319	Japanese Light Cruiser Yubari	-	Yes	-
31320	Japanese Light Cruiser Natori	-	Yes	-
31321	Japanese Light Cruiser Kinu	-	Yes	-
31322	Japanese Light Cruiser Nagara	-	Yes	-
31323	Japanese Light Cruiser Isuzu	-	Yes	-
31341	Japanese Aircraft Carrying Cruiser Mogami	2002	Yes	-
31342	Japanese Heavy Cruiser Mikuma	-	Yes	-
31343	Japanese Heavy Cruiser Suzuya	-	Yes	-
31344	Japanese Light Cruiser Kumano	-	Yes	-
31349	Japanese Light Cruiser Abukuma	-	Yes	-
31359	Japanese Light Cruiser Mogami	-	Yes	-
31401	Japanese Destroyer Fubuki	-	Yes	-
31402	Japanese Destroyer Shiratsuyu	-	Yes	-
31403	Japanese Destroyer Harusame	-	Yes	-
31404	Japanese Destroyer Hatsuyuki	-	Yes	-
31405	Japanese Destroyer Ayanami	-	Yes	-
31406	Japanese Destroyer Akatsuki	-	Yes	-
31407	Japanese Destroyer Hibiki	-	Yes	-
31408	Japanese Navy Destroyer Shikinami	-	Yes	-
31409	Japanese Navy Destroyer Shimakaze	-	Yes	-
31428	Japanese Destroyer Matsu	-	Yes	-
31429	Japanese Destroyer Sakura	-	Yes	-
31435	Japanese Submarine I-58 Late Version	-	Yes	-
31453	Japanese Navy Submarine I-16 & I-58	-	Yes	-
31460	Japanese Navy Destroyer Shimakaze	-	Yes	-
31544	Battleship Yamato 大和	2011	Yes	Rebox from 31113
31613	U.S. Battleship BB-63 Missouri	2003	Yes	-
31614	U.S. Battleship New Jersey	-	Yes	-
31615	British Battleship Prince of Wales: Battle of Malaya	-	Yes	-
31616	U.S. Battleship Iowa	-	Yes	-
31617	British Battlecruiser Repulse	-	Yes	-
31711	U.S. Escort Carrier CVE-9 Bogue	-	Yes	-
31713	U.S. Aircraft Carrier CV-3 Saratoga	-	Yes	-
31804	U.S. Heavy Cruiser Indianapolis	-	Yes	-
31805	German Heavy Cruiser Prinz Eugen	-	Yes	-
31806	British Battlecruiser Hood & E Class Destroyer - Battle of Denmark Strait	-	Yes	-
31902	U.S. Destroyer DD-445 Fletcher	1996	Yes	-
31903	U.S. Submarine Gato Class & Japanese Submarine Chaser No.13	-	Yes	-
31904	British Destroyer O Classa	-	Yes	-
31906	Russian SSGN Kursk (Oscar II Class)	-	Yes	-
31907	U.S. Fletcher-Class Destroyer DD-797 Cushing	-	Yes	-
31908	German Destroyer Z Class (Z37-39) "Project Barbara"	-	Yes	-
31909	British Destroyer E Class	-	Yes	-
31910	Royal Australian Navy Destroyer Vampire	-	Yes	-
31911	U.S. Destroyer DD412 Hammann	-	Yes	-
77502	British Battleship Rodney	1974	Yes	-
77504	British Battleship Nelson	-	Yes	-
77510	U.S. Aircraft Carrier Hornet	-	Yes	-
77514	U.S. Aircraft Carrier Enterprise	-	Yes	-
77518	German Battlecruiser Scharnhorst	-	Yes	-
77520	German Battlecruiser Gneisenau	-	Yes	-
77525	British Battleship King George V	-	Yes	-

*This list is incomplete, please help out and add more products

== Dinosaur models ==
In 2023, Tamiya reissued their old dinosaur kits from the 1980s and 90s.

List of all Tamiya Dinosaurs
Kit number	Model	Release year	In production	Comment
60101	Chasmosaurus Diorama Set (Series No.1)	1993	No	-
60102	Tyrannosaurus Diorama Set (Series No.2)	1993	No	-
60103	Parasaurolophus Diorama Set (Series No.3)	1993	No	-
60104	Triceratops Diorama Set (Series No.4)	1994	No	-
60105	Velociraptors Pack of Six (Series No.5)	1994	No	-
60106	Brachiosaurus Diorama Set (Series No.6)	1994	No	-
60107	Mesozoic Creatures Diorama Set (Series No.7)	1994	No	-
60201	Triceratops Eurycephalus (Prehistoric World Series No.1)	1981	Yes	-
60202	Stegosaurus Stenops (Prehistoric World Series No.2)	1981	Yes	-
60203	Tyrannosaurus Rex (Prehistoric World Series No.3)	1981	Yes	-
60204	Pteranodon (Prehistoric World Series No.4)	1981	Yes	-
28501	Fukuiraptor	2026	Yes	New tool, Static snap-fit kits
28502	Fukuisaurus	2026	Yes	New tool, Static snap-fit kits
28503	-	2026	Yes	-

== Limited special editions ==
List of all Tamiya limited editions
Kit number	Model	Release year	In production	Comment
25100	-	201	No	-
25189	-	201	No	-
25190	Japanese Navy Destroyer Yukikaze Detail Up set	2019	No	-
25191	German Heavy Self-Propelled Howitzer Sd.Kfz.165 Hummel (Late Production) "White Box Pre-Production"	2019	No	-
25192	Lamborghini Countach LP500S Red Body w/Clear Coat	2019	No	Rebox
25193	-	201	No	-
25194	Japan Ground Self Defense Force Light Armored Vehicle "White Box Pre-Production"	2019	No	-
25195	U.S. Army Self-Propelled AA Gun M42 Duster "White Box Pre-Production"	2019	No	-
25196	U.S. M8 Light Armored Car "Greyhound"	2020	No	Rebox
25197	German Armored Railway Vehicle P204(f) Limited edition white box	201	No	Rebox
25198	German Panzerkampfwagen 38(t) Ausf. E/F "White Box Pre-Production"	2019	No	Rebox
25199	Lockheed P-38H Lightning	2020	No	Rebox
25200	Swiss Messerschmitt Bf109 E-3	2020	No	Rebox with new decals
25201	Mitsubishi Ki-46 III Type 100 Command Recon Plane (Dinah) w/Background Pamphlet	2020	No	Rebox
25202	Lockheed P-38J Lightning Metallic Edition Shizuoka Hobby Show Limited	2022	No	Rebox
25203	Kawasaki Ki-61-Id Hien (Tony) & 4x4 Light Vehicle Kurogane Set	2023	Yes	Rebox
25204	Messerschmitt Bf109 G-6 & Kubelwagen Type 82 Set	2023	Yes	Rebox
25205	North American P-51D Mustang & 1/4 ton 4x4 Light Vehicle Set	2023	Yes	Rebox
25206	Dornier Do335A Pfeil & Kubelwagen Type 82 Set	2023	Yes	Rebox
25207	Leopard 2A6 Tank "Ukraine"	2023	Yes	Rebox with new decals
25208	Panzerkampfwagen IV Ausf F. & Motorcycle North Africa	2023	Yes	Rebox with new parts
25209	Panzerkampfwagen IV Ausf G. Early Production & Motorcycle Eastern Front	2023	Yes	Rebox with new parts
25210	Lancia Stratos Turbo	2023	Yes	Rebox with new parts
25211	Supermarine Spitfire Mk.I & Light Utility Car 10HP Set	2023	Yes	Rebox
25212	Ilyushin IL-2 Shturmovik & GAZ-67B Set	2023	Yes	Rebox
25213	Focke-Wulf Fw190 D-9 JV44 & Citroen Traction 11CV Staff Car Set	2023	Yes	Rebox
25214	P-47D Thunderbolt "Bubbletop" & 1/4-ton 4x4 Light Vehicle Set	2023	Yes	Rebox
25215	Messerschmitt Me262 A-2a w/Kettenkraftrad	2023	Yes	Rebox-
25216	M1A1 Abrams Tank "Ukraine"	2023	Yes	Rebox with new decals
25217	Mitsubishi Ki-46 III Type 100 & 4X4 Light Vehicle Kurogane Set	2024	Yes	Rebox
25218	Japanese Navy Destroyer Yukikaze "Yukikaze Movie Version"	2025	Yes	Rebox
25219	-	2025	Yes	Rebox

== R/C models ==
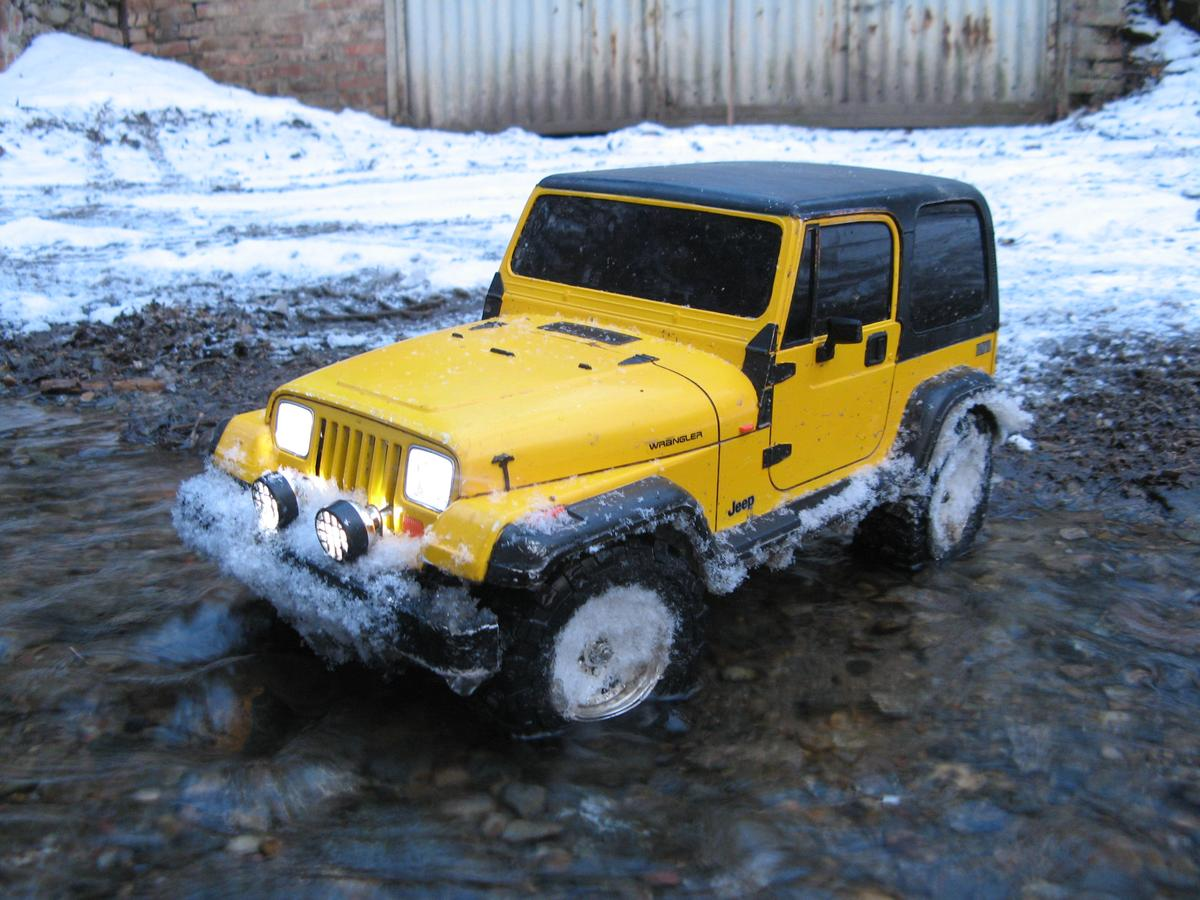
RC model Tamiya Jeep Wrangler YJ in 1/10 scale

=== 1/10 cars ===
- Williams FW07 (CS), although not the first F1 car to be released, as well as being the second to use the CS (Competition Special) banner, further changes would be made with its release. As well as having the standard equipment found on all CS models the main chassis is single deck FRP rather than the single deck aluminium of early versions, the motor mount is a lighter pressed alloy instead of heavy cast alloy as well as front uprights of nylon instead of alloy and a rear motor pod of stamped metal plate instead of cast metal. Examples can fetch almost US$1000.The SRB line of off-road buggies began in 1979 starting with the Rough Rider, than the Sand Scorcher, followed by the Ford Ranger. These vehicles featured a scaled down version of the Volkswagen Beetle chassis used on many desert racing buggies. The final SRB to come along in 1983 was the Super Champ. The Super Champ was unique from the other SRBs due to its use of a rear "mono -shock" design. Aside from the SRB line were the Hilux and Blazing Blazer 3 speed 4 wheel drives both released in 1982. The original Wild Willy kit was revised in 1985 to give it a slightly longer wheelbase leaving the earlier, shorter wheelbase version quite hard to find. Wild Willy 2 was released in 2000 utilizing a pre-assembled Wild Dagger gearbox and tires from Lunch Box, but otherwise a wholly new mechanical design. Wild Willy 2 retained the Jeep body with only a few minor differences, such as horizontal front grill slits instead of the vertical slits of the original. There has also been a metallic edition of Wild Willy 2.
- The Subaru Brat was released in 1982. It was a two-wheel-drive off-road radio-controlled buggy that was both fast and much lighter than its predecessors. This model also marked a new balance between the use of metal and plastic components. The chassis of the Brat was used for the basis of the Frog, Black Foot, and Monster Beetle.
- The Frog, released in 1983, was an improvement on the previous year's Brat release. It featured an updated differential, ball bearings, oil shocks, and a lighter polycarbonate body. The Frog was very popular and marked the beginning of Tamiya's use of animal themes to draw inspiration for its vehicle designs and colours – an idea that proved extremely popular and which was continued through several kits. The Frog kit was also re-released in 2005, though with a few alterations such as more reliable dog bone type universal shafts and an Electronic Speed Controller. The Frog's lower price and weight (compared to the earlier Rough Rider), began the 1/10 scale offroad racing phenomenon. However, its role in racing was limited with the release the following year of the Team Associated RC10.
- The Grasshopper, released in 1984, was a two-wheel-drive off-road radio-controlled buggy. It was very rugged and featured a simple construction and was Tamiya's most affordable buggy. It featured a bathtub chassis holding a simple rigid axle in the rear and single wishbone front suspensions in the front. Its 380-sized motor meant it was among Tamiya's slower models at the time, though its lighter ABS plastic bathtub chassis helped put its speed only a little behind that of the earlier, heavier Special Racing Buggies. It was also much more economical on batteries and overall it was the ideal off-roader for the first-time hobbyist which also made it very popular. The Grasshopper kit was re-released in 2005 with a few alterations.
- The Hornet, released in 1984, was a two-wheel-drive off-road radio-controlled buggy which was quite fast and rugged. It shared most components with the Grasshopper, though it was faster and lighter due to a polycarbonate (Lexan) body. It would go on to become one of the most popular R/C kits of all time and was re-released in December 2004 with a few alterations. There was also a sequel, the Super Hornet, which was released in 1994 and was still being manufactured exclusively for the Australian market until 2006, making it one of the longest-running Tamiya kits in history.
- The Thunder Shot, Released in 1987, was a four-wheel-drive buggy. The Thunder Shot was the first Tamiya Buggy to be released as a 'Complete Kit'. Only two of the First 100 were released as a complete kit. It included an ADSPEC Controller and Servo inside the box which had the 58067 model. This was bundled as model 57001. The Sonic Fighter was 57002. Both were introduced in the Tamiya yearly catalogue for the first time in the 1988 issue shown as complete kits. For the 1989 issue and every issue until they were no longer available in 1991 the Thunder Shot was always pictured and shown only in the 58067 form. The complete kit was only available for the first production run and was discontinued mid-1988. Generally, most collectors do not know of the Thunder Shot 'complete kit'. With only a couple left in the world that have not been built, it makes the unbuilt Thunder Shot 'complete kit' one of the most prized models to find for a collector. Especially seeing only two of the first 100 were ever released in this form with a much bigger box to house the 58067 and the ADSPEC controller and Servo.
- The Hotshot, released in 1985, Tamiya's first four-wheel-drive off-road buggy. It broke new ground for Tamiya and also enthusiasts, and was the car to beat in 1/10-scale buggy racing when it was released. It featured four-wheel independent double-wishbone suspension, a unique mono-spring suspension that used only two springs for the entire four wheels. For its time, the car was light, rugged and upgradeable. In the years that followed parts of the Hotshot were evolved and reused in several other 4WD buggy models including the Hotshot 2 (which was identical aside from simpler direct rear suspension), the Boomerang, the Super Sabre and Tamiya's 10th Anniversary car, the Bigwig. In 2007 the Hotshot was re-released. An ESC is included instead of a mechanical speed controller and the body has a metal patch functioning as a heatsink to dissipate heat from the ESC, dog-bone shafts are simplified, Hexa bolt and Hexa cup universal for connecting front and rear gearboxes are discarded and a simpler dog-bone shaft is adapted. Because of ESC the original heatsinks on resistors for the mechanical speed controller are no longer necessary but are included as dummies as they are unique to the Hotshot. Other parts and designs are identical. Unfortunately, there remain some minor problems with Hotshot: bump steer, the front wishbones rubbing on the inside of the front wheels and the front spring's attachment point to the lower wishbones being weak.
- The Bruiser 1/10-scale radio-controlled pickup truck, released in 1985, had a working three-speed transmission which could be shifted via radio control, a high-torque RS-750SH motor and an ultra-realistic Toyota Hilux body with a sleeper cab and interior detail. The steel frame, leaf suspension, front, and rear axle and steering were patterned after their full-sized counterparts. This complex model has since become one of the most collectibles of all Tamiya R/C cars. It featured a mechanically shiftable 3-speed transmission, using a 3rd radio channel. It would run in 4x4 mode in the lowest gear only. No other RC car or truck of the time offered shiftable mechanical transmission making it highly realistic.
- The original Blackfoot monster truck kit and its variations, first released in 1986, was credited with much of the hobby's growth. The Blackfoot line included the original Blackfoot, Super Blackfoot, and King Blackfoot, all sharing the same ORV spaceframe chassis first used in Frog but featuring some improvements. The Blackfoot Extreme used the chassis from the Wild Dagger. The Blackfoot was a Ford F-150 despite its inspiration being drawn from the real Bigfoot monster truck which was a Ford F-250. The Monster Beetle, now a very collectible model, was nearly identical to the Blackfoot with the addition of gold wheels, oil-filled shocks and of course the Volkswagen Beetle bodyshell.
- Vanessa's Lunchbox, actually a 1/12-scale kit due to its monster truck design and short wheelbase, was released in 1987. It made use of the strong Grasshopper/Hornet gearbox and had an exceptionally detailed hard body shell of a Dodge van, heavily inspired by the real monster truck Rollin' Thunder. It was a "fun" vehicle, having poor stability and performing long wheelies, and in many respects was therefore similar to real monster trucks of the (then) future. This also made it one of the more popular models and it was re-released in 2005 with only minor modifications. A metallic gold edition followed in 2007.
- Midnight Pumpkin is a sister truck to the Lunchbox that used the same chassis, gearbox, suspension, and tyres. It was also based on a real monster truck, Frankenstein, although the model was mostly black instead of the yellow worn by the real truck. In early 2006, a metallic chrome edition was released.
- The Clod Buster 1/10-scale radio-controlled monster truck was released in 1987 as the first Tamiya R/C monster truck with two drive motors, four-wheel drive, and four-wheel steering. Each of the front and rear axles were identical, and the motor is attached to the axle itself, making it a very simple design. This simple design allowed the axles to be used in modified vehicles. The Clod Buster spawned an aftermarket industry of its own that catered to those who wished to modify their models to "crawlers", specialized vehicles designed to climb steep and rugged surfaces. The Clod Buster has remained popular since its introduction and produced the Super Clod Buster. The Clod Buster was also released with a detailed semi-truck body, as the Bullhead. The Clod Buster still has a large aftermarket following with many companies designing parts for rock crawling as well as trailer pulling and racing. The main reason for its continued use is its ultra-strong gearboxes.
- The Avante, released in 1988. This was a car specifically designed to return Tamiya to the forefront of R/C racing. Its unique design featured an FRP chassis, aluminium components everywhere and almost limitless adjustments. Unfortunately, it was somewhat over-engineered – The car was too heavy, too fragile, dynamically inept, and uncompetitive. However, it is still a highly desirable model to a Tamiya collector because of the unique and uncompromising engineering that went into it.
- The Egress is the follow-up to the Avante, with material that was advanced for the time. Unlike the Avante, it has simplified suspension and a longer wheelbase arrangement that was seen in Vanquish/Avante2001.The avante drivetrain is carried forward except with ball diffs F/R and one-way bearing in the middle. Like the Avante it was a no expense is spared car, it even came with Platinum hi-cap dampers, a full set of blue-rubber-sealed bearings, graphite chassis plates and towers, alloy hardware and titanium screws.
- The Astute was Tamiya's first attempt to build a serious 2WD competition car. The car came equipped with everything that was needed to make the car competitive including ball diff, ball-raced gearbox, oil-filled dampers at each corner, front anti-roll bar and all adjustable suspension geometry. The unusual step of installing metal bushes in all suspension pivot points was taken, which reduces the amount of slop in the suspension due to flexing and slows down the rate of wear in these joints. Although fully adjustable this did add extra weight and complexity and it may be for these reasons that it was never very widely used on the racing scene. Jamie Booth did win the European championship in 1991 with a modified and simplified Astute with parts from Tamiya Madcap. Some of his modifications were later found on the Super Astute which addressed many of the faults of its predecessor.
- The Nissan Skyline GT-R Nismo was a TA-01 chassis kit (packaged with an R32 GT-R body) released in 1991. The TA-01 chassis was derived from the Manta Ray buggy with shorter arms, narrower wheels and radial tires. This kit wasn't the first TA-01 kit (which was the Toyota Celica GT-Four Rally), nor was the TA-01 the first chassis to be designed to be fitted with a touring car body (as there had been body kits that were designed to fit into buggies). Due to its popularity, this Skyline GT-R kit was credited for creating the touring car craze during the early 1990s as well as the chassis introducing the one-make low-cost racing known as the Tamiya Racing Championship.
- The TR-15T was one of the first gas-powered stadium trucks to be released on the market. Unfortunately, the TR-15T was not a commercial success and was discontinued quickly. Nowadays the car is one of the more collectible RC models commanding over $450 in a mint boxed unopened condition.
- The Juggernaut was an attempt to create a true monster truck, bigger than any previously attempted in the R/C world. It featured 4×4 and four-wheel steering with a tire diameter of 6.5 inches (16.5 cm) and weighing one pound (0.45 kg) each. It remains as one of the biggest and failures in Tamiya's history. It featured two rigid axles but, unlike Clod Buster, two motors were located in the central gearbox in tandem. From the central gearbox two universal shafts connected to the front and rear axles. Its massive weight of 4.5 kg, combined with low gear ratios necessary to provide enough torque to move the monster, would simply destroy the bevel gears in the axle in one run. Tamiya quickly revised many parts: The bevel gears in the axle received reinforcements of more bearings and lower gear ratios. Released in 1999 Juggernaut would have received a prominent feature in the 2000 Tamiya Catalog signaling that Tamiya was back in monster trucks after the 13 years since Clod Buster. Due to its catastrophic failure Juggernaut is not featured in any of the yearly catalogs at all. Instead, the revised and re-colored Juggernaut 2 appears in the 2001 catalog along with the Mammoth, a Juggernaut 2 based Mammoth Dump truck. Juggernaut 2 and Mammoth both retained the complex link suspension and leaf springs that did not allow adequate articulation, giving them a very bouncy ride.
- The TXT-1 (Tamiya Extreme Truck) 1/10 scale radio control monster truck was released in 2002. The axles and gears are almost entirely identical to Juggernaut 2, with slightly bigger diameter universal shafts. With TXT-1 Tamiya engineers shifted attention from simply building a massive monster truck to a very capable rock crawler. This truck, which is still in production, was designed as a factory response to aftermarket Clodbuster upgrades. Four-wheel drive and cantilever multi-link suspension allow for the axle articulation featured in third party kits such as the Clodzilla series. The new truck dispensed with the unreliable four-wheel steering of Juggernaut 1 and 2's single under-powered servo sat in the center of the vehicle. Instead, the TXT would mount one servo to steer the front wheels only. As an option, the rear axle can also mount a servo allowing all 4 wheels to steer. Tamiya engineers attended USHRA monster truck events in order to improve the scale appearance of the TXT and duplicate full-size suspension designs. Having fixed all the Juggernaut's suspension problems and with improved chassis and steering it remains one of the most capable crawlers.
- The TRF414 series radio-controlled cars was holder of the 2002–04 IFMAR ISTC 1/10-scale electric touring car world champion title. The TRF414 was created in response to Tamiya's customer demands for a more adjustable and efficient touring car than the TA03. It was the first Tamiya touring car to depart from the previous gear-driven layouts used in the TA01/02 and TA03, instead employing two unequal-length belts to transmit the power to all four wheels with only one geared step. The TRF414M2 was a popular touring car due to its low cost relative to other cars in its class.
- The TRF415 holder of the 2004–06 IFMAR ISTC 1/10-scale radio-controlled electric touring car world champion title.
- The TA01/TA02 chassis series from the early-mid-1990s were sold with various body shells. The TA01 was based on Tamiya's Manta Ray buggy and was one of the first kits on the market to be sold with a realistic body coupled with a capable, easy-handling 4WD chassis. Some of these body shells are among the most realistic and detailed lexan bodies ever made by any manufacturer. Models worthy of note are the E30 BMW M3, W201 Mercedes 190E 2.5–16 Evolution-II, Ford Escort RS Cosworth and the Lancia Delta Integrale. Tamiya re-released the bodies recently, either sold separately or bundled with a TT-01 kit.
- The TL-01/TL-01LA/TL-01B/TL-01RA chassis, released from the mid-'90s to the late '90s, was an innovative shaft-driven 4WD touring chassis with a narrow three-piece vertically sandwiched chassis design. Its characteristics include high durability and low cost, making it an excellent starting car for beginners. Like the TA01/TA02 it was released with many different rally, touring and sports car bodies and incorporated various minor modifications throughout its production run. Tamiya released the TL-01 with modified with long arms and buggy size wheels to as the TL-01B marketed as the Baja Champ and later Baja King buggies. The TL-01 remains one of the more popular Tamiya chassis today.
- The TLT-1 is a small truck of about 1/15 scale. It is a scaled-down version of TXT-1. Light weight and TXT-1 style suspension system makes it a very capable little climber. It has quickly become widely known as one of the most versatile RC cars for projects for scale rock crawling, a hobby that is starting to make itself noticed by the general RC market. Like the Clod Buster, its axles are highly desirable.
- Nitro Thunder is a 4×4 buggy powered by a .15 glow engine. It utilizes an off-road racing buggy chassis called NDF-01. Just as TNX has shown promise in racing circuits the NDF-01 is a smaller 1/10 sized off-road racer. Use of a resin tub chassis, instead of aluminum, and a frontal impact control system that absorbs shocks from a collision indicate that Nitro Thunder is built with young racers in mind. Adjustability of the suspension, rear exhaust and full ball bearings are features often found in models for experienced racers. Just as Kyosho offers scaled-down 1/10 buggy of their 1/8 buggies for inexperienced racers Nitro Thunder is Tamiya's entry into the 1/10 buggy market. Nitro Blaster is an identical buggy with different exterior.
- The Ford F-350 High Lift, released in 2006, is a modernized version of the vintage three-speed trucks, such as the Bruiser and Mountaineer. A three-speed gearbox from the tractor trailer truck series mounts on steel chassis rails, with leaf springs and grease friction dampers supporting it on modified TLT axles. The truck is finished with a detailed hard body version of the Ford F-350, very similar to the earlier Juggernaut's body. It is a very capable crawler in its own right and a sister truck, with a Bruiser (Toyota Hilux) body was released in Dec 200, with a scale surf board as an accessory.
- The TA05, released in spring 2005, is the replacement for the TRF414-derived TA04 line of touring cars. The chassis is a clean-sheet design featuring a twin-belt drivetrain utilizing two equal-length belts, a center-mounted motor and a low layshaft, resulting in a nearly 50/50 front–back weight distribution. The car is very popular with touring car racers due to its ease of set-up and its relatively low-maintenance drivetrain. Tamiya marketed the TA05 with various sports and racing car bodies and Tamiya also released the TA05-IFS (Inboard Front Suspension) along with the limited-edition TA05MS (Maezumi Satoshi), and the hopped-up TA05R (containing the most popular TA05 upgrades) in spring 2007. The IFS features an inboard front suspension with pushrod-activated laydown shocks (as opposed to standup shocks attached directly to the suspension arm), which is a first for a 1/10 scale electric mainstream touring car. The chassis can be bought with various low-slung bodies such as the Vemac RD350 body in Ebbro Team Nova's livery (who participated in the GT300 class in the 2007 JGTC), the GT500 Lexus SC430 (in various liveries), and the 2007 Raybrig NSX.

=== 1/12 cars ===
- The first radio-controlled car to be released by Tamiya was a Porsche 934 in 1976. Its body was based upon an existing 1/12 scale static kit that Tamiya had already been manufacturing, so the effect was that of a traditional static model kit with the added ability to be radio-controlled – something Tamiya acknowledged, as all of their early kit boxes carried the wording "suitable for radio control". The Porsche 934 was a massive hit – selling over 100,000 units in its first year. The potential market for easy to assemble electric radio-controlled model cars was clear and the 934 was soon followed by a kit of the Porsche 935.
- Lamborghini Countach LP500S (CS), the eighth car to be released by Tamiya (58008). Although released previously (58005) this model is the first to use the Competition Special tag, meaning that it is a hopped-up (Hop-up meaning more powerful or souped-up) version. The early models came equipped with the more powerful RS540 unit, as opposed to the standard RS380S, and sponge/diplo tyres, which were later adopted by competition cars of that size as opposed to rubber. It also featured a thicker chassis with different cast metal steering.
- Can-Am Lola RM1, based on the T333 that Jacky Ickx used to win the reformatted Can-Am series in 1979. This was Tamiya's further foray into building competition cars, hence the RM (Racing Master) tag that appeared on the box, the first of seven cars. The car did feature a few groundbreaking innovations that became common in other RC cars, these were the introduction of the first hop-up RC motor the Mabuchi Black RS-540SD, fully adjustable flex/tweak chassis (including adjustable castor & ackerman, bulletproof ball raced sealed rear diff.), over-engineered sophisticated step-less MSC with microswitch and braking, to use the BEC radio gear and to come fully ball raced. It was the first Tamiya car to use a polycarbonate body shell rather than the heavier and fragile moulded ABS of the previous cars. This was soon followed by the release of the Datsun 280ZX RM Mk2, a model of the car driven by Paul Newman to win the SCCA CP title. A narrower redesigned version of the RM chassis with the same axle/drivetrain/steering components as the RM1, but minus the MSC, diff, bearings and RS-540SD Motor; all which can be fitted in as an option.
- Tornado RM. Mk3, released two years after the first RM model, leading to an upsurge in the market for the 1/12 scale pan racers, which by then many companies including Associated, Schumacher, Delta, Kyosho, and ABC had become involved in the market. As a result, Tamiya redesigned the RM's pan chassis reducing its weight by leaving out some of the less-used items that were offered in the RM1. Other adjustments were that the RM3 could accept the 7.2V stick packs and an uprated adjustable mechanical speed controller, known as the SuperChamp MSC. The RM3's steering arrangement had returned to the simpler setup with an adjustable caster. The body shape would become common with RC cars throughout the decade. Tamiya's further evolution with the RM5/6 (Porsche 956 and Toyota 84C) would be another all-new design featuring a stiffening top plate and a floating rear pod with a single spring.
- The Porsche 959, released in 1986 was a 1/12 scale radio-controlled replica of the car that won the 1986 Paris Dakar Rally and was one of the most complex and highly detailed R/C model kits ever made. It was soon followed by the Toyota Celica Gr.B, a replica of the Safari Rally winner, which shared the same chassis as the Porsche 959 but included several upgrades such as a third differential in the centre of the car and a much needed front anti-roll bar, making it an even more complex kit.

=== 1/14 trucks ===
Tamiya produces 1/14 scale radio controlled trucks using ABS body shells. The trucks 540-size electric motor/3-speed transmission-combination is powerful enough to tow an adult behind the truck on a skateboard.

Available in the current truck range are the following rigs:

- King Hauler (also available in a pre-painted black edition)
- Globeliner
- Mercedes-Benz 1838LS
- Mercedes-Benz 1850L (distribution truck)
- Volvo FH12 Globetrotter 420
- Ford AeroMax (also available in a limited chrome edition)
- Knight Hauler (also available in a limited chrome edition)
- Scania R-series R 470 Highline (also available in a chrome edition and a pre-painted orange edition)
- Scania R-series R 620 Highline
- MAN TGX 18.540 XLX (also available in a pre-painted red edition)
- MAN TGX 26.540 XLX
- Mercedes-Benz Actros 1851 GigaSpace
- Freightliner Cascadia Evolution
- Grand Hauler

The truck range also includes some 2 axle trailers "North American style":

- Flatbed trailer (the basic flat trailer)
- Box trailer (closed cargo trailer)
- Tank trailer (liquid transport)
- Pole trailer (wood/tree transport)

Tamiya also offers 3 axle "Euro type" semi-trailers in their regular line-up.

- European Type 3 Axle Reefer Semi Trailer
- European Type 3 Axle 40 ft Intermodal container Semi-Trailer (with authentic "Maersk" container graphics)

In addition, sound and lighting options are available for the trucks and semi-trailers both from Tamiya and aftermarket manufacturers. Tamiya's original light- and soundkit is the "MFU", a plug-and-play module specifically designed for their line of trucks but unfortunately this unit is very old, inaccurate and clumsy compared to those available from aftermarket manufacturers such as the Servonaut brand from German Tematik.

Aftermarket manufacturers offer various conversion kits and accessories, including hydraulics, modified cabs, lighting, and sound modules. These allow hobbyists to customize their models to replicate real-world vehicles or create original designs.

Worldwide, various clubs build 1/14-scale dioramas for social gatherings and driving competitions. These clubs operate across Asia, Europe, and the Americas.

=== 1/16 tanks ===
Tamiya's radio controlled tanks have options such as sound, light and optional parts to depict different variants.

- German Panther tank G
- German Tiger I Early Production
- German Tiger II Production Turret
- German Tiger II Porsche Turret
- German Jagdpanther
- German Leopard 1 A4
- German Leopard 2 A6
- German Flugabwehrkanonenpanzer Gepard
- U.S. M4 Sherman 105 mm
- U.S. M26 Pershing T26E3
- U.S. M551 Sheridan
- British Centurion MK.III

The Leopard A4 and Flakpanzer Gepard are no longer produced; updated versions of the others have some technical and cosmetic innovations over the original models. The non-multi function models of the Tigers and Sherman are not made any more.

The latest models (Full Option Kits) have full sound function, fire simulation (barrel moves when fired), the latest Full Option Tank (Leopard 2A6) has an upgrade part available, a barrel stabilizer which keeps the cannon level even with the tank moving.

As of 2023, only the Centurion, Leopard 2A6, Tiger I, King Tiger, and M1A2 Abrams Full Option 1/16 kits remain in the Tamiya catalog: Tanks. However, they have been unavailable for an extended period of time.

Also there is a battle function unit for sale, so you can actually fight a tank battle with another Tamiya battle function equipped 1/16 tank.

These tanks utilize standard RC modules such as receivers, transmitters and servos that are same as those used in RC cars, trucks, boats, airplanes and helicopters.

=== 1/20 yachts ===
Tamiya produced a series of 1/20 scale which are highly realistic. These include:

- Yamaha Round the World
- Yamaha 40EX
- 36 Class R/C Racing Yacht Innovator

=== 1/32 track racing cars ===
- The Mini 4WD and Dangun-Racer series are small (1/32 scale) single-motor (130-size) free-operating electric models designed to operate using two AA-sized batteries and run on a special deeply channeled track.

=== Tamtech ===
- Tamtech, released in 1986, is a series of smaller radio controlled cars which can be quickly assembled and driven, powered by a 7.2v battery. The first two cars released were the Porsche 962 followed shortly by the Lancia LC2. Seven 1/24 cars have been released with the other five being: BMW GTP, Ford Mustang Probe, Ferrari Testarossa, Porsche 961 and Lamborghini Countach 5000QV. Tamiya turned next to 1/14 F1 cars releasing only three: Ferrari 643, Lotus 102B and McLaren MP4/6. Finally one 1/18 monster truck, Max Climber, was made before the Tamtech line was dropped in favor of the QD ready to run cars. In 1988 Tamiya released a scale model of the Porsche 962 using the Tamtech body, however accurate, many model builders and enthusiasts of the Group C/IMSA GTP racer cited the rear bulk of the engine hatch is bigger than that of the full-sized counterpart. Much of the car's lack of real success was because the popularity of the large sized counterpart meant that there were very little demand for small-scale RC cars. The Tamtech cars would later influence other RC car manufacturers including Kyosho to build miniature RC cars, such as their own highly successful Mini-Z series and RadioShack's popular XMODS.

=== RC gliders ===
- Tamiya offers a couple of Radio Controlled gliders with wingspans around 6 ft. (2 metres). Peak Spirit has a foldable propeller that can be deployed when necessary. Alt Stream is an unpowered RC glider.

=== Quick drive ===
The QD (quick drive) series are 1:14 scale pre-built and simplified versions of Tamiya's 1/10 scale RC cars and trucks. This series was introduced in 1988 with the Thunder Shot QD aimed at bringing the joys of RC racing to children. The models were pre-assembled and supplied ready-to-run with radio gear, batteries and charger all included and featuring a two-speed gearbox. The range included versions of the Midnight Pumpkin, Super Sabre, Manta Ray and Monster Beetle.

=== Solar powered cars ===
Tamiya, as well as building solar powered educational models, also built the first solar powered radio controlled car called the Solar Eagle SRC-6000.

=== Solar powered models ===
Tamiya has a history of making educational kits, made especially a few solar powered models, but they have made a rare foray into licensed anime merchandising with the Solaemon-Go. The solar powered car was based on the real World Solar Car competitor which is based on the popular Doraemon manga, published by Tamiya's publishing partner, Shogakukan.

== Tamiya Racing Factory ==
Tamiya and their racing team, Tamiya Racing Factory (TRF), have evolved into one of the most successful racing teams on the electric scene of worldwide R/C racing over the last few years. They are most famous for their work in the field of 1/10 scale electric touring car racing.

In 1999, at the request of many Tamiya enthusiasts, Tamiya started work on a car made purely for racing to replace their aging, gear-driven TA03R-TRF and TA03F David Jun Edition cars. The car that resulted was the TRF414X (built in very small numbers), which evolved into the TRF414M, and then to the more popular TRF414M2 (and the budget-oriented TA04 series), all employing the then-novel twin-belt drivetrain layout, with the center layshaft mounted above the motor. The TRF team's reputation shot up after the 3rd IFMAR ISTC world championships in Mogale City, South Africa, in 2002. The Thai driver Surikarn Chaidajsuriya shocked the world by winning the world championships driving a modified Tamiya TRF414M. The car he used was eventually released to the public as the TRF414M-World Championship Replica, of which only 1500 were built making it one of the more desirable Tamiya kits from the last 5 years.

Since 2002 the TRF division has continuously been growing with an expanded team in Japan and worldwide. In late 2002 Tamiya released their third shaft driven car called TB Evolution III (or TB Evo3) which won the YamaYama Cup in Japan two months later, with Satoshi Maezumi at the wheel. On the European scene the Dane Steen Graversen, along with Surikarn Chaidajsuriya and team manager Kiyokazu Suzuki, managed to join the A-main of the big LRP Masters race in Germany during April 2003. Surikarn then won both the 23T stock and the Modified classes in the Thailand International Touring Car championships (TITC) using an updated TB Evo3. Surikarn's Evo3 was eventually released to the public as the limited-edition TB Evo3 Surikarn Edition (SE) to commemorate the victory. It features red anodized aluminum components, new upper arm mounts, titanium turnbuckles and screws, delrin differential halves, a thicker 3 mm carbon chassis, and a new one-way carbon gear brace. The TB Evo3 SE was eventually replaced with the TB Evo4 in the first half of 2004. The Evo4 addressed the Evo3 owner's complaints about their car's bevel gear durability by incorporating a three-piece center shaft design, doing away with the Evo3's single-piece center shaft. The Evo4 was also equipped with Tamiya's lightweight reversible suspension set, incorporating smaller wheel bearings, stiffer material and reversible longer suspension arms which allows more cornering speed and more precise adjustment of the car's suspension characteristics.

The same year Tamiya discovered a new young star, a boy named Marc Rheinard from Germany. Rheinard debuted at the indoor race DHI Cup of 2004 with Tamiya's new belt driven car (designed in conjunction with Tech Racing) the TRF415. He and Steen Graversen finished 2nd and 3rd, proving the capability of this newly designed chassis. Two months later Rheinard won the LRP Masters world's best drivers. Things looked good for the upcoming 4th World Championships in Florida, USA. Few believed that Rheinard would actually win the world championships at the age of 17, but he did. Tamiya took their new and improved version of TRF415, the TRF415MS which stands for Maezumi Satoshi, one of the car's designers and a Tamiya factory driver. The new car had improved handling characteristics on asphalt through the adoption of a thinner chassis and the Evo4's lightweight reversible suspension. Rheinard took pole position and won two of the three A-mains. The other Tamiya driver in the top ten was former world champion Surikarn, driving the TB Evo4, who finished 9th.

After the 2004 World Championship Tamiya released the upgrade kit for the 415 containing the direct center pulley (as opposed to the center one-way included in the standard 415 and 415MS kits) and narrowed suspension mounts, further improving the 415 handling and acceleration. In early 2005 Tamiya released an updated version of the TB Evo4, called the TB Evo4MS. The Evo4MS was equipped with one-piece aluminium bulkheads (as opposed to the Evo4's 4-piece bulkhead), aluminium center brace and one-piece center shaft input cups (as opposed to plastic ones in the Evo4).

In July 2005 Tamiya further updated the TRF415MS by releasing the TRF415MSX. They released both as a conversion kit (for older 415s) and as a complete kit. The design featured a three-piece bulkhead for easy maintenance, a lowered and shortened upper deck that runs under the belt, and the removal of the middle decks — all of which contributed to a lower center of gravity and an increased "tweak" resistance. Marc won the World's Warm-Up in April 2006 with a revised version of the MSX sporting a new set of lowered rear bulkheads, shock towers, and steering mechanism. Unfortunately he only placed 4th overall in the 5th IFMAR ISTC World Championships held in August 2006 in Collegno, Italy, but his car was eventually released to the public as the limited-edition, asphalt-racing TRF415MSX Marc Rheinard Edition (MRE) in August 2006. It incorporated new alternated (having more widely spaced teeth) pulleys, a new lightweight delrin solid front axle, new internal drive ratios (through the adoption of the new pulleys), and the new steering mechanism. In July 2006 Tamiya released the TB Evolution 5, their next-generation gear-driven touring car, replacing the Evo4 MS. The Evo5 did away with the Evo4's front main shaft input cup, using a CV joint instead (but retaining a rear input cup), and also incorporates the new short arms for the lightweight suspension, which further increased the cornering speed and helped sharpen the car's turn-in. It was also equipped with a new, more precise steering mechanism (seen also in the TRF415MSX MRE), and a lowered top deck. In November 2006 Tamiya ceased the production of the MRE and released the updated TRF415MSXX. This car returned to the standard front one-way differential (unlike the solid axle included in the MRE) and came with new thinner upper and lower decks (altering the chassis flex characteristics), and a new aluminum air scoop to help cool the motor.

== Supplies and Tools ==
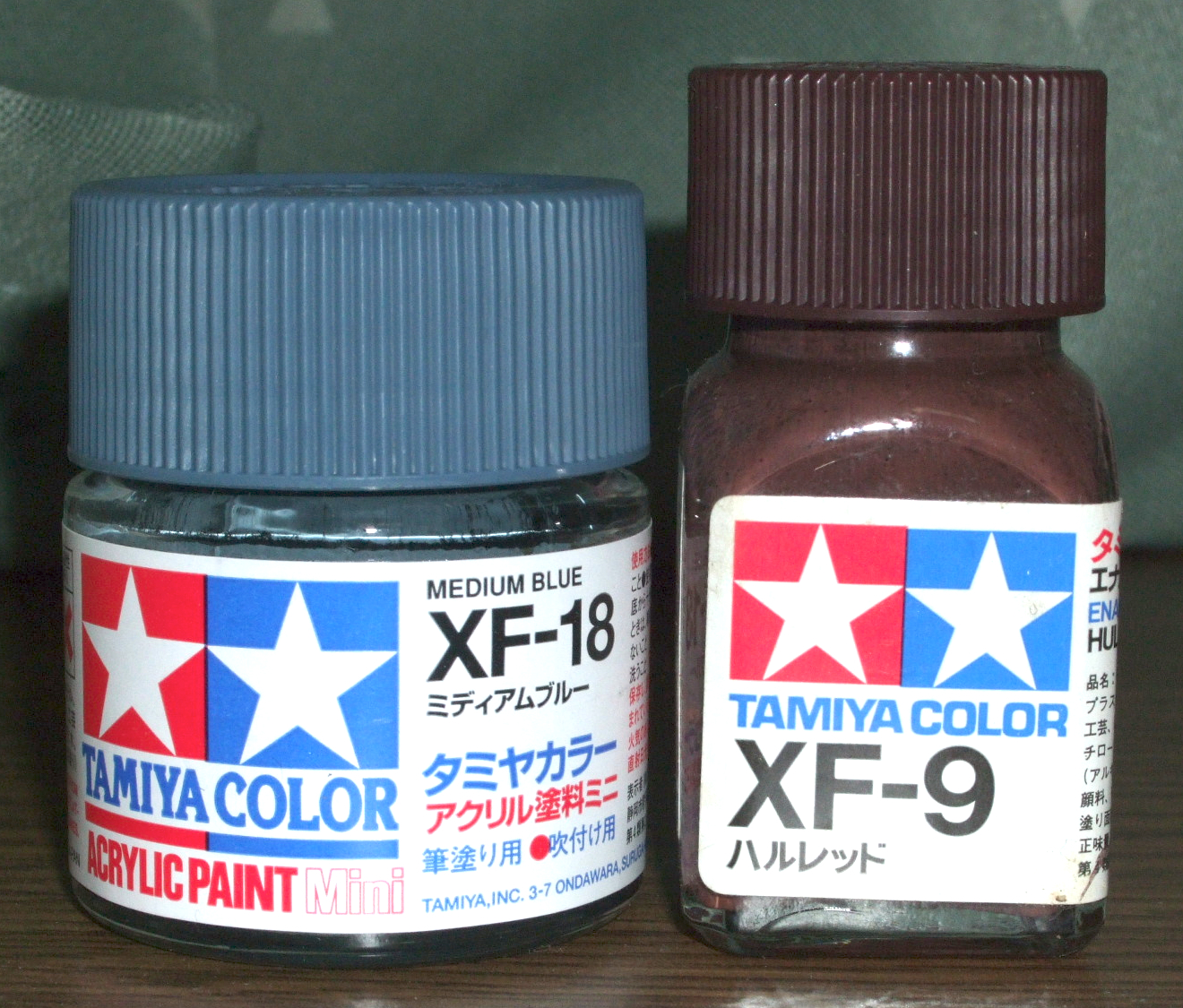
Tamiya color paints

Tamiya manufactures acrylic and enamel-based modelling paints, sprays and painting pens. Tamiya manufactures supplies such as putty, solvent, and modelling tools. They also provide upkeep equipment for their RC models, such as grease for the working gear boxes, work tables, airbrush stands and turn tables.

Tamiya's paints, like all their products, are recognised as superior quality. Tamiya released a line of "weathering" kits which allow the user to easily and quickly give their models the impression they have been damaged, have rusted or have been through a long service life.

== General-purpose simple-model construction sets ==
Tamiya also offers an extensive line of "sturdy plastic" basic construction sets (as one division of the GeniuSeries) for building very simple battery-powered "working" models, such as a mobile claw-lifter, bulldozer, fork lift, crawler-type vehicles with multiple tank-treads, and toy "robots"—all usually operated by an equally simple wired remote-control. (There is at least one high-end model with radio-control however.) While some of these model "kits" can be used alone or in combination to create other things as desired, the product line also features many small general-purpose sets of parts like various plates and beams, wheels and axles, pulleys, chain drives, various remote-controls, and link-style tank treads with sprockets, as well as several types of motors (some waterproof) and gearboxes (some with multiple speed/torque configurations) In addition, some models also feature special parts like cams and flywheels.

Though the appearance of most of the parts themselves is somewhat similar to Lego Technic, the build process and result is much more like Erector Set since parts are actually fastened together with bolts through an array of available mounting holes (or in some cases with preassigned screws or glue) rather than merely snap-fit; and finished models remain very skeletal, having no outer shell or hull. Although kit-instructions even show steps at the level of gearbox and controller assembly, on at least some models some structural and/or non-structural parts are actually made of pre-drilled wood, and may need to be glued together; for example the wooden main base-plate of the #70108 Tracked Vehicle Chassis Kit

The wired remote-control is generally at most 2+1 "channels" and controls 2 independent motors for driving (thus permitting standard 8-direction movement: F, FL, FR, B, BL, BR, CW, CCW) plus 1 motor for operating a feature such as the claw-arm of the mobile claw-lifter (though claw-grip is alas mechanically rigged to arm position.)

Overall, Tamiya models should be somewhat sturdier than equivalent Erector Set models due to their thicker parts, and both should be sturdier than Lego Technic due to their physical fastenings rather than simple snap-fit, but both Erector Set and Lego Technic are much more flexible thanks to their complete lack of single-purpose part-joining points, self-tapping screws, and the need to glue parts.

== Other ==
In the 1980s Tamiya introduced a Programmable logic controller for their moving models. It used the TMS1100 4-bit Microcontroller. developed by TI.

== Notes ==
- 田宮俊作著『田宮模型をつくった人々』文藝春秋刊 2004年9月発行 ISBN 4-16-366250-2
