= 1:35 scale =

Scale for model military vehicles

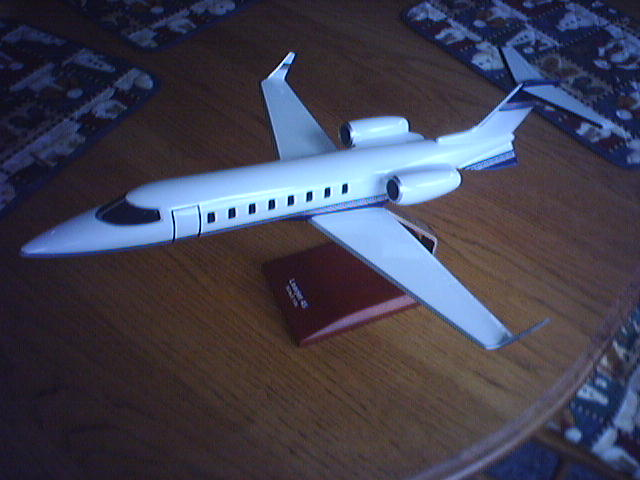
A 1:35 scale Learjet 45

1:35 scale is the most popular scale for model military vehicles, with an extensive lineup of models and aftermarket parts available from a wide variety of manufacturers. It corresponds to 50 mm on figurine scales.

The roots of 1:35 as a military modelling scale lie in early motorized plastic tank kits. To accommodate electric motors and gearboxes, these models needed to be made in a larger scale. There were many companies making such tanks, but it was Tamiya's example that made 1:35 a de facto standard.

Company chairman Shunsaku Tamiya explains the origins of the scale in his book Master Modeler:

After the success of the Panther, I thought it would be a good idea for us to produce other tanks from different countries in the same scale. I measured the Panther and it turned out to be about 1/35 of the size of the original. This size had been chosen simply because it would accommodate a couple of B-type batteries. Tamiya's 1/35 series tanks eventually got to be known around the world, but this is the slightly haphazard origin of their rather awkward scale.

Early kits in the scale, built around bulky motorization components, often sacrificed scale appearance and detail, but their large size and potential for intricate superdetailing appealed to hobbyists.

Over the years, kits have become more and more detailed and accurate, and nowadays there is a whole industry in 1:35 dedicated to offering aftermarket detail parts for kits. After a new kit is released, companies like Aber and Eduard usually make detail sets available for it, allowing modellers to replace kit parts with more accurate photoetched alternatives.

In terms of model range, 1:35 is typically limited to military land vehicles and figures. Some helicopter kits also exist in the scale, whereas large airplane kits are more commonly done in 1:32 scale. In recent years, there have been some aeroplane releases in 1:35 as well, typically of vehicles operating in close contact with ground forces, such as the Fieseler Storch liaison aircraft or the Horsa glider. The figures are usually designed to go with the AFV's though, and are largely based around World War II. World War I figures are unusual and pre-1914 figures are very rare indeed.
