= Tamiya Clod Buster =

Radio-controlled monster truck toy

The Tamiya Clod Buster is a 1/10-scale radio controlled monster truck released September 21, 1987 by the Tamiya Corporation. With its four-wheel drive, four-wheel steering, twin Mabuchi RS-540 motors and 165 mm tires it quickly became one of Tamiya's most popular radio controlled model kits.

The Clod Buster and its related models virtually spawned an aftermarket industry of modifications that could be done to it to improve performance and durability. Many small businesses have popped up over the years to cater to just the Clod Buster owner and a few have since gone on to have great success manufacturing parts for other R/C models. The model's body is a detailed replica of a Chevrolet pickup truck, but the current "Super Clod Buster" has a different grille and tailgate after Tamiya had a falling out with Chevrolet in 1990, thus showing no Chevrolet logos on the model.

So large is the aftermarket for the Clod Buster that it is possible to build one entirely of aftermarket parts with no Tamiya parts whatsoever.

The main competitor to the Clod Buster was the Kyosho Double Dare. The Double Dare was released two years later by Kyosho and had many of the same features with some improvements. It did not sell nearly as well, but the introduction of a challenger to the Clod started the move to improve the technology of radio controlled monster trucks. Today, both trucks are regarded as pioneers of the genre.

The Clod Buster also had a Mini 4WD version, using Tamiya's Mini 4WD WILD chassis, which could accommodate big pneumatic tractor wheels. It has long been discontinued.

== Tamiya Bullhead ==
The Tamiya "Bullhead" which was released November 13, 1990 utilises the same basic chassis design as the Clod Buster, albeit moulded in different coloured plastics. The most significant difference is that it carries a taller semi-tractor type body, likely inspired by fullsize semi-bodied monster trucks such as "Super Pete". The other differences between the Bullhead and Clod Buster (other than the body) lie mainly in the color of the plastic used for various parts. The Bullhead has a red chassis, while the Clod has a black chassis. The shocks, gearcase bumpers, end links and a few other small parts are yellow on the Bullhead; these same parts are red on the Clod Buster. Other minor differences on the Bullhead are its chrome-plated wheels, chrome suspension bars and a chassis brace. Since Tamiya discontinued the Bullhead, mint condition examples sealed in-box have become very rare.

Like the Clod Buster, the Bullhead also had a WILD Mini 4WD version. It came in a kit with grey chassis and attachments. It still can be purchased in kit form sealed in-box, but it has been discontinued as of 2021.

== Tamiya Super Clod Buster ==
In February, 2004 the original Clod Buster and Bullhead were discontinued, but owing to the model's continued popularity, Tamiya released a new version called the Super Clod Buster. The only differences between the two are the colors of various parts which were changed from red to blue, the removal of Chevrolet badging and emblems and the addition of the chromed wheels and chassis brace that were previously available only on the Bullhead.

== Specifications ==
- Scale: 1/10
- Length: 18.90 in (480 mm)
- Width: 14.96 in (380 mm)
- Height: 13.50 in (340 mm)
- Wheelbase: 10.63 in (270 mm)
- Front tread: 10.63 in (270 mm)
- Rear tread: 10.63 in (270 mm)
- Weight: 8.60 lb (3900 g) and approx 4350 g RTR
- Chassis: ABS plastic tub
- Suspension: Solid axle/trailing link
- Damper type: Eight plastic coilover friction shocks; oil-filled are available
- Drive train: Dual gearboxes, dual motors
- Gear ratio: 30.1:1
- Differential Type: Bevel gear
- Motors: Dual 540 type (Mabuchi or Johnson)
- Bearings: 16 plastic bushings and 4 ball bearings (1260) and 4 metal bearings (850)
- Speed control: Three-step, forward/reverse mechanical
- Wheels: White ABS plastic. Chrome plated on the Bullhead and Super Clod Buster.
- Tires: 6 1/4 x 4 1/4 in "V-lug" heavy equipment chevron pattern
- Body/material: Chevrolet Fleetside, styrene
- Radio: Two-channel surface frequency (not included)
- Battery: 7.2 V (not included)
