= Bakusō Kyōdai Let's & Go!! =

Television anime

- The Racing Brothers Let's & Go!!
- Cover of the first manga volume with Retsu Seiba with Sonic Saber (left) and Go Seiba with Magnum Saber (right)

爆走兄弟レッツ&ゴー!! (Bakusō Kyōdai Rettsu Endo Gō!!)
- Genre: Sports (racing)
- Created by: Tetsuhiro Koshita; Tamiya
- Manga
- Written by: Tetsuhiro Koshita
- Published by: Shogakukan
- Magazine: CoroCoro Comic (1994–99); CoroCoro Aniki (Note: Return Racers!! chapters.) (2014–21); CoroCoro Ichiban (Note: Tsubasa: The Next Racers chapters.) (2017–21); CoroCoro Online (2021)
- Original run: July 1994 – November 2021
- Volumes: 31
- Manga series
- 1. Let's & Go!! (13 volumes, 1994–97); 2. Let's & Go!! MAX (7 volumes, 1997–99); 3. Let's & Go!! Return Racers!! (6 volumes, 2014–21); 4. Let's & Go!! Tsubasa: The Next Racers (5 volumes, 2017–21)
- Anime television series
- Directed by: Tetsurō Amino
- Written by: Hiroyuki Hoshiyama
- Music by: Gōji Tsuno; Masakazu Uehata
- Studio: Xebec
- Original network: TXN (TV Tokyo)
- English network: Okto
- Original run: January 8, 1996 – December 22, 1997
- Episodes: 102
- Anime film

Let's & Go!! WGP: The Chase of the Uncontrollable Mini 4WD!
- Directed by: Tetsurō Amino
- Written by: Tetsurō Amino
- Studio: Xebec
- Released: July 5, 1997
- Runtime: 80 minutes
- Anime television series

Let's & Go!! MAX
- Directed by: Takao Kato
- Written by: Hiroyuki Hoshiyama
- Music by: Gōji Tsuno
- Studio: Xebec
- Original network: TXN (TV Tokyo)
- English network: Okto
- Original run: January 5, 1998 – December 21, 1998
- Episodes: 51

The Racing Brothers Let's & Go!! (Japanese: 爆走兄弟レッツ&ゴー!!, Hepburn: Bakusō Kyōdai Rettsu Endo Gō!!; lit. "The Racing Brothers Let's & Go!!") is a manga series created by Tetsuhiro Koshita, first serialized in Shogakukan's CoroCoro Comic magazine from July 1994 to October 1999. The manga centers on Rettsu and Go Seiba, brothers who focus on the world of miniature car racing known as Mini 4WD. It is created as a tie-in to Tamiya's Mini 4WD franchise (mainly Fully Cowled, Mechanical and Aero), and is the second series to center on the franchise since Dash! Yonkuro.

Three anime adaptations of the manga were produced by Xebec from 1996 to 1998, each of which consisting of three 51-episode series, and was also made into several games. The series also released various merchandise, including CDs, trading cards, stickers, and even die-cast cars. In 2014, a sequel series, Return Racers, began serialization in Shogakukan's CoroCoro Aniki magazine, 20 years after the original series' serialization. A spin-off manga, which focuses on Tsubasa, was serialized on CoroCoro Ichiban in 2017.

== Plot ==
Mini 4WD racing is a hobby where kids and adults compete using customized motorized miniature cars. Every year, competitions revolving around the hobby circulated around the world, where kids and adults test out their spirit and passion for racing, with companies developing new technologies and innovations for Mini 4WD cars. The story revolves around the competitive Seiba Brothers: Go and Rettsu, who were once constantly arguing with each other to see who between them is the best racer. One day, however, after a community-sponsored race they both met Dr. Tsuchiya, the head of the Tsuchiya Racing Factory who gave them two Mini 4WD Cars from the prototype Saber Series: Sonic Saber and Magnum Saber. With his advice to customize them for the upcoming race, they are now determined to win, race to victory and set off on the wildest race of their lives while meeting both friends and enemies in the Mini 4WD Racing world.

== Characters ==
=== TRF Victorys ===
Go Seiba (星馬 豪(ゴー), Seiba Gō)
Voiced by: Haruna Ikezawa, Showtaro Morikubo (Return Racers web radio)
Go is one of the two title characters. He is Rettsu's younger brother by one year, and is in the fourth grade. Go is initially depicted as rash, impulsive, careless, and impatient, but on some occasions, he can be calm, kind and gentle. He is usually seen wearing goggles, but they are more of a fashion accessory as they are on his forehead most of the time as opposed to covering his eyes. His primary color is blue, which is the color of his hair, eyes, gloves, and boots. His cars, the Magnum series, are all known for their speed. In Return Racers, Go has retired from Mini 4WD racing and is now a professional racing driver. In his private life, he drives a BMW Mini convertible. He met a boy named Tsubasa, who became his protege at his will as Tsubasa intends to follow Go's legacy as a Mini 4WD racer.
Rettsu "Let's" Seiba (星馬 烈(レッツ), Seiba Rettsu)
Voiced by: Yuriko Fuchizaki
The other title character, Rettsu, (Note: Although kanji 烈 is normally spelled Retsu (レツ, れつ), in this case it is spelled Rettsu (レッツ, れっつ) with the addition of a sokuon between kana re and tsu. This change was made so that the character's name would sound the same as the word "Let's" (レッツ) transcribed in katana.) is an eleven-year old fifth-grade student, and Go's older brother. Although he is able to control his patience better than his brother, he still lets out his annoyance with someone once in a while, especially those who anger him. Rettsu sports a green hat as his trademark. His primary color is red, which is the color of his hair, eyes, gloves and shirt. Rettsu is charming, kind-hearted, and sweet. Although he and Go are siblings and team up together, they often argue a lot. All of his Mini 4WD cars, the Sonic series, are well-rounded and have great off-road capabilities. The Seiba brothers are known as the "Let's Go Brothers" (レッツゴー兄弟, Rettsu Gō Kyōdai). In WGP, Rettsu is the captain of the TRF Victorys. In Return Racers, he is working in the Space Development project on recommendation of Dr. Tsuchiya.
Ryo Takaba (鷹羽 リョウ, Takaba Ryō)
Voiced by: Urara Takano
Ryo is a nomadic wanderer who, with his brother Jiromaru, lives off the land. When he first meets the Seiba brothers, he quickly becomes their rival, particularly that of Go. Eventually though, he becomes a friend of the Seiba brothers, as well as a member of the TRF Victorys. It is later revealed that Jo from Astro Rangers had crush on him because Ryo saved her once. It was once shown when the Astro Rangers coach asked Dr. Tsuchiya where Ryo lives because one of them seems to have some feeling toward him.

Tokichi Mikuni (三国 藤吉, Mikuni Tōkichi)
Voiced by: Chie Kōjiro
Tokichi is a spoiled rich boy, whose father is a well-known entrepreneur. He is in fact the heir to the Mikuni Corporation. When he first meets the Seiba Brothers, Go takes an instant liking to him, most likely because of his wealth. His family owns an arcade, which is always the hot spot for kids and instantly attracts Go. When speaking, he pronounces "desu" (です, meaning "is" or "to be") as "degesu" (でげす). His cars emphasize on technical cornering ability. Tokichi also likes to make his entrances in the manners of stereotypical rich kids, such as jumping out of a helicopter, arriving in a limousine, and surrounded with an entourage with great fanfare.
J (ジェイ, Jei)
Voiced by: Kumiko Watanabe
Initially a battle racer in the Ōgami Corps, trained under Dr. Ōgami, J later finds enjoyment in regular racing with the Seiba brothers. Because of this, he decides to leave Ōgami Labs, renouncing the anything-to-win attitude instilled by Dr. Ōgami, and goes to live with Dr. Tsuchiya in his laboratory as an assistant. As a result, he also gradually changes in his personality, turning from an introvert into a high-spirited boy. Of all the other team members, J is the most skilled technician and mechanic, having prior experience with computers and machines while under Dr. Ōgami's training. These skills are shown on many occasions, namely when he repaired the damaged Tridagger X to repay Ryo for damaging it in a previous race, when he helped Go design and build the Cyclone Magnum and when he designed the Proto Saber EVO. He appears to be best friends with Go.
Jirōmaru Takaba (鷹羽 二郎丸, Takaba Jirōmaru)
Voiced by: Ikue Ōtani
Jirōmaru is Ryo Takaba's younger brother. He likes Ryo a lot, and follows him around everywhere. His cars, the customized Saber 600, are constantly damaged in races. In episode 10 of the WGP season, Jirōmaru substitutes Ryo after his leg is injured.

Dr. Tsuchiya (土屋博士, Tsuchiya-hakase)
Voiced by: Masashi Ebara
The head of the Tsuchiya Racing Factory, Dr. Tsuchiya is the owner and pioneer in the Mini 4WD development, with half of his inspirations coming from his experience with jet planes, both as a pilot and an engineer, as shown in his lesser-seen parts of his labs. It is also where he found the inspiration to create the Super Avante, the prototype used for all the Saber series of Mini 4WD cars, but he has ongoing conflict in ideals against Dr. Ōgami as the story progresses. He is named after Hirotsugu Tsuchiya, a Tamiya employee.

=== Ichimonji Brothers ===
Gohki "Go" Ichimonji (一文字 豪樹, Ichimonji Gōki)
Voiced by: Kumiko Watanabe
One of the two main characters of MAX, Gohki is Retsuya's older brother. He is a former Battle Racer at Borzoi School until he and his brother quit due to their conflicting ideals between him and the academy itself. He aims to become a true Mini 4WD racer with his brother to clear his reputation. He is currently living in a workshop owned by their uncle, who is working for GEN Manufacturing. Despite his rustic behavior, he has a good heart and values the spirit of Mini 4WD racing. He is also shown to be good on mechanics.
Retsuya "Let's" Ichimonji (一文字 烈矢, Ichimonji Retsuya)
Voiced by: Noriko Hidaka
The other main character of MAX, Retsuya is Gohki's younger brother. Like Gohki, he is also a Battle Racer at Borzoi School and is a good in racing, but like his brother, he also left the battle racing scene and decided to change for the better. He is currently living in a workshop owned by their uncle, who is working for GEN Manufacturing.

=== Ogami Corps ===
Dr. Ogami (大神博士, Ōgami-hakase)
Voiced by: Ryūzaburō Ōtomo
The head of Ogami Corps, Ogami is introduced as the rival scientist to Dr. Tsuchiya. He advocated battle racing, where racers are encouraged to install weapons to their Mini 4WDs and destroy their opposition during races. He worked with Dr. Tsuchiya in the past, but split due to disagreements in their beliefs about what Mini 4WD racing should be. He owns a large laboratory hidden in a volcano, where his cars are developed. He has a daughter named Marina. In MAX, he worked with Dr. Ichimonji as a scientist at Borzoi School to create a new machine. He is also shown to not wear his headgear anymore and uses a cane to help him walk. At the end of MAX, he throws away his beliefs of battle racing after seeing that his daughter Marina refused to use the weapons installed into her machine, Phoenix Stinger, in the final parts of the M1 race.
Marina Ogami (大神 マリナ, Ōgami Marina)
Voiced by: Haruna Ikezawa
The daughter of Dr. Ogami, Marina appears in MAX. A skilled Battle Racer and Mini 4WD racer, she owns the Fire Stinger, a successor to the Ray Stinger developed by her father. Though she usually lives in a private condominium with high expenses every month, her private life remains a mystery even to the Ichimonji brothers. She is also a regular in the onsen house "Matsunoyu". She later joins to the Borzoi School after being reunited with her father and her machine being upgraded to the Phoenix Stinger.
Kai Okita (沖田 カイ, Okita Kai)
Voiced by: Yuka Imai
Kai is the first of the Ogami Corps' three battle racers to appear. His car, the Beak Spider, caused a massacre of Mini 4WDs around city parks, where they were secretly damaged, much to ire of their owners. Following the Summer Great Japan Cup, he is shown to develop rivalry with Ryo. In the WGP anime, he appears as the coach of the Savanna Soldiers team, where the team members (led by Juliana) use a modified version of his car dubbed Beak Zebra.
Gen Kondo (近藤 ゲン, Kondo Gen)
Voiced by: Ayumi Kida
One of Ogami's battle racers, Gen is the owner of Brocken Gigant, a front-motor Mini 4WD that possesses the ability to perform a wheelie to stomp and destroy a rival car. He was the one who destroyed Go's Victory Magnum in the manga version.
Rei Hijikata (土方 レイ, Hijikata Rei)
Voiced by: Satoko Kito
One of Ogami's battle racers and the only female member of the trio, Rei is the owner of the Ray Stinger, a Mini 4WD with laser control and a needle to attack her opponents' cars. In the anime, she was the one who destroyed Go's Victory Magnum in a mid-air surprise attack. In the Power WGP2 game, she joins to the Les Vainqueur team, under the disguise of Ame (アーム).

=== NA Astro Rangers ===
Brett Astaire (ブレット・アスティア, Buretto Asutia)
Voiced by: Kentarō Itō
Born in Washington, D.C., Brett is the captain of the NA Astro Rangers. His hair color is blond and he wears a black T-shirt, a red jacket, visor goggles and black pants with a belt. While he seems to be cool, strict and snobbish, Brett is at heart caring and kind.
Edge Blaze (エッジ・ブレイズ, Ejji Bureizu)
Voiced by: Hisayoshi Izaki
Born in Los Angeles, Edge is an outgoing and cheerful guy, as well as a member of a Los Angeles soccer club. He is shown to be very emotional, but he can control his anger.
Josephine "Jo" Goodwin (ジョセフィーヌ・グッドウィン, Josefīnu Goddowin)
Voiced by: Akiko Yajima
A young, ponytail-haired girl born in New York City, Josephine is kind and friendly to everyone, except for Rosso Strada. She does not like to be underestimated, and is quick to anger. Jo has feelings for Ryo, as he saved her from a jet-ski accident.
Michael Miller (マイケル・ミラー, Maikeru Mirā)
Voiced by: Hidehiro Kikuchi
Born in Salt Lake City, Michael is the youngest member of the team, as seen with his physical appearance of an elementary student similar to the Seiba brothers. He may be small, but he is smart and skilled.

David "Hammer D" Grant (デーヴィッド・グラント, Dēviddo Guranto)
Voiced by: Takuma Suzuki
Born in San Francisco, Hammer D is the tallest and oldest member. Like Jun, he likes to play baseball, and when bad things happen, he begins to worry a lot and cannot concentrate. Because of this, he is learning to focus himself.

=== Other racers ===
Jun Sagami (佐上 ジュン, Sagami Jun)
Voiced by: Chinami Nishimura
Jun has been a friend of the Seiba brothers since they were very young. She is an ace pitcher in baseball, and plays for a team named "Jun Chanzu" (ジュンちゃんず). At first, she is a novice at Mini 4WD racing, but improves in her skill through the influence of the Seiba brothers and others. In Return Racers, she develops some romantic feelings for Go, but decides not to confess because she knows that Go has a crush on her friend, Chiko. Jun's name, combined with those of Rettsu and Go, is a reference to Jun Rettsugō (レツゴー じゅん, Rettsugō Jun), the stage name of Japanese comedian Yoshiji Watanabe.
Makoto Kohiro (こひろ まこと, Kohiru Makoto)
Voiced by: Motoko Kumai
Makoto is a regular racer whose determination can nearly overcome the Seiba brothers in the Winter GJC qualifying cup. He is the first named rival to the Seiba brothers and his friendly attitude allows him to be friends with the protagonists. His performances are not as shining as other racers, but his determination and luck allows him to win the Winter GJC. He does not appear much in races after the introduction of Kai Okita and Ōgami's battle racing rule. He is a part of the Super Great Japan Cup's 12 racers.
Futoshi Kurosawa (黒沢 太, Kurosawa Futoshi)
Voiced by: Akio Suyama
A big and rowdy racer, Kurosawa is the owner of "Black Saber", another prototype Mini 4WD created by Dr. Tsuchiya, and specializes in modification of the machine and upgrade parts to be used in various situations. Kurosawa starts out as a cheater who puts weapons into his car, but he never wins a race that way. He flies to America and comes back even more vicious, but with the appearance of Kai Okita and his Beak Spider, which possesses weapons more powerful than Kurosawa's, he decides to race normally and becomes a permanent ally of the protagonists. He is shown to have allies; three of them (as named in Summer GJC entry list in episode 26) are named Timota, Rokukawa, and Masa.
Chiiko Mikuni (三国 チイコ, Mikuni Chiiko)
Voiced by: Akiko Yajima
Chiiko is Tokichi's younger sister, who has a crush on Rettsu. She owns a Mini 4WD called the "Flower Axe", which is actually a customized variant of Tokichi's Spin Axe. In episode 18 of the WGP season, when Chiiko becomes jealous of the female WGP competitors, she imagines a scene where a group of female admirers crowds around Rettsu. Oddly enough, the group includes Riichi, a male character.
R (アール, Āru)
Voiced by: Arisa Andō
R is J's older sister, who was originally thought to have died in a plane accident on her way to America while she and J were still kids. She was disappointed at J upon learning that he had defected from Ogami, but later understood why after the first race of the SGJC. She is last seen returning to America, saying that if J sees her there, she would show J what real racing is.

=== Supporting characters ===
Takeshi Sugiyama (杉山 闘士, Sugiyama Takeshi)
Voiced by: Showtaro Morikubo
Also known as "Mini 4 Fighter" (ミニ四ファイター, Mini Yon Faitā), Takeshi is the emcee, announcer, and commentator for most Mini 4WD races. He has a crush on Ms. Manami, Go's teacher. In the anime, he owns a legendary Mini 4WD called "Shining Scorpion", given to him by Dr. Tetshin before his retirement in racing. In the manga, he owns a star-and-striped machine that resembles Victory Magnum, the "Fighter Magnum VFX". In MAX, he goes to America along with the members of TRF Victory's, Dr. Tsuchiya, Dr. Tesshin and Jiromaru, but due to his inability to speak English, he comes back to Japan, donning a mask and disguising himself as the "Masked Fighter" while doing commentary for Mini 4WD races. He later reveals his identity as Mini 4 Fighter by removing his mask in the 48th episode of MAX.
Tamotsu Sagami (佐上 保, Sagami Tamotsu)
Voiced by: Hidenari Ugaki
Tamotsu is Jun's father and the manager of the Sagami Model Shop that the Seiba brothers frequent. Despite running a business, he refuses to supply any Battle Racing Parts as he believes that racing is not about destroying other vehicles.
Kaizō Seiba (星馬 改造, Seiba Kaizō)
Voiced by: Hidenari Ugaki
Kaizō is the father of the Seiba brothers. He quickly developed an interest for Mini 4WD and likes to race together with his sons. His personal vehicle is a customized variant of the Saber 600, which he personally calls it the "Godfather Special". If not for the rule saying that adults cannot participate on Mini 4WD competitions, he would enter them.
Yoshie Seiba (星馬 良江, Seiba Yoshie)
Voiced by: Shinobu Adachi
The mother of the Seiba brothers, Yoshie has a bighearted and courageous personality. At first, she dislikes Mini 4WD racing, mostly due to her annoyance with Rettsu and Go constantly fighting about them, but she eventually grows used to it.
Masamune Ichimonji (一文字正宗, Ichimonji Masamune)
Voiced by: Hidetoshi Nakamura
The father of the Ichimonji brothers, Masamune develops the Mini 4WD machines called the "Z Series" and is acquainted with Dr. Tsuchiya and Dr. Ogami. He was formerly employed with the Borzoi School, but he was later dismissed after Nero, the grandson of Professor Borzoi, came to Japan. He would then be helped by his brother that lent him a property owned by the acquaintance of their family at Kawashita-cho, and set his new research laboratory there.
Sayuri Dōmoto (堂本サユリ, Dōmoto Sayuri)
Voiced by: Yuka Imai
Also known as "Fighter Lady" (ファイターレディ, Faitāredi), Yuka works as a commentator for Mini 4WD races from episode 25 of MAX. She admires Mini 4 Fighter and calls Masked Fighter as "Fake Fighter" until she realizes his true identity as Mini 4 Fighter in episode 48. She works part-time at GEN Manufacturing. She has been playing Mini 4WD when she was young. She owns the machine "Fighter Lady Magnum", which is a customized version of Fighter Magnum VFX.

== Media ==
=== Manga ===
The manga series originally ran serially in CoroCoro Comic starting in the June 1994 issue through the October 1997 issue, compiling into 13 tankōbon volumes. A sequel/spin-off called The Racing Brothers Let's & Go!! MAX (爆走兄弟レッツ&ゴー!! MAX, Bakusō Kyōdai Rettsu Endo Gō!! Makkusu), with new protagonists Retsuya and Gohki, was published from November 1997 to October 1999 and was compiled into seven tankōbon volumes. A second sequel, titled The Racing Brothers Let's & Go!! Return Racers!! (爆走兄弟レッツ&ゴー!! RETURN RACERS!!, Bakusō Kyōdai Rettsu Endo Gō!! Ritān Rēsāzu!!), began serialization on Coro Coro Aniki in October 2014 before it temporarily stopped publication and continued its serialization in Coro Coro Online until November 2021. The new series depicted Go's and Rettsu's life 20 years following the end of the original series, as well as new flashback stories. A third sequel, (Note: Although it was published around the same time as Return Racers!! and ended before it, Tsubasa: The Next Racers is considered a sequel to this series.) titled Let's & Go!! Tsubasa: The Next Racers (レッツ&ゴー!!翼 ネクストレーサーズ伝, Rettsu Endo Gō!! Tsubasa Nekusuto Rēsāzu-den), began serialization on CoroCoro Ichiban in August 2017.

=== TV anime ===
An anime adaptation of the series was produced by Xebec, directed by Tetsurō Amino (Macross 7) and written by Hiroyuki Hoshiyama. It first aired on TV Tokyo from January 8 to December 30, 1996, covering the first half of the manga. A second season titled The Racing Brothers Let's & Go!! WGP (爆走兄弟レッツ&ゴー!! WGP, Bakusō Kyōdai Rettsu Endo Gō!! Wārudo Guranpuri) aired from January 6 to December 22, 1997, covering the second half of the manga. Both seasons have 51 episodes each. An eponymous anime adaptation of The Racing Brothers Let's & Go!! MAX manga was directed by Takao Kato aired on from January 5 to December 21, 1998, totaling 51 episodes. Both series were also aired by GMA Network from 1999 to 2001, first dubbed in English and later in Tagalog.

=== Anime film ===
A film based on the second season titled The Racing Brothers Let's & Go!! WGP: The Chase of the Uncontrollable Mini 4WD! (爆走兄弟レッツ&ゴー!!WGP 暴走ミニ四駆大追跡!, Bakusō Kyōdai Rettsu Endo Gō!! Wārudo Guranpuri Bōsō Miniyonku Dai Tsuiseki!) was released in theaters in Japan on July 5, 1997. In the Philippines, the film was released as Let's & Go!! The Movie: Tamiya on January 12, 2001.

=== Games ===
- Mini 4WD Shining Scorpion Let's & Go!! (1996, Super Famicom, ASCII Corporation)
- Mini 4WD GB Let's & Go! (1997, Game Boy, ASCII Corporation)
- Mini 4WD Super Factory (1997, Sega Saturn, Mediaquest)
- Mini 4WD Bakusō Kyōdai Let's & Go!! WGP Hyper Heat (1997, PlayStation, Jaleco)
- Mini 4WD GB Let's & Go! All-Star Battle MAX (1998, Game Boy, ASCII Corporation)
- Bakusō Kyōdai Let's & Go!! Eternal Wings (1998, PlayStation, Jaleco)
- Bakusō Kyōdai Let's & Go!! POWER WGP2 (1998, Super Famicom, Nintendo)

== See also ==
- Racer Mini Yonku: Japan Cup
- Mini 4WD
- Dash! Yonkuro
- Tamiya Corporation
- CoroCoro Comic
