= Tamiya TXT-1 =

The Tamiya TXT-1, which stands for Tamiya eXtreme Truck, was one of Tamiya's 1/10 scale radio controlled (RC) Monster Trucks.

== History ==
The TXT-1 was released originally between 2000 and 2002, proving very popular. Tamiya discontinued the truck in July 2012. It was created to compete with the Traxxas T-Maxx/E-Maxx that was dominating the hobby.

It has also been used as the basis for robot systems.

== Features ==
The most significant and most obvious feature of the TXT-1 over most other available RC monster trucks is the twin vertical plate chassis and, more important, the straight axle suspension system. The former is specified as 6mm machined aluminum plate with extensive milling to reduce weight without critically reducing rigidity. Several tubular aluminum braces improve the structure, while the closed plastic transmission housing is a stressed member. Two formed plastic plates serve to further improve rigidity while providing ample space for mounting electronic components.

The TXT-1 exhibits a straight-axle suspension system damped via silicone-filled shocks, the latter a departure from friction shocks used on the Clod Buster. Of note is the fixed-ratio cantilever arrangement actuating the shocks which lengthens the effective range through which the shocks travel, increasing suspension articulation. By design the vehicle is somewhat prone to stability-degrading torque steer and body roll. The truck features zip-ties retaining metal anti-sway bars which significantly improve stability.

== Motor ==
The truck, available only as a kit, comes equipped with twin 540-J size sealed endbell stock motors wired in parallel when using the standard mechanical speed control. The motors feed power through a closed gear-reduction transmission terminating in a single dual-end output shaft which subsequently turn metal telescoping driveshafts running to each axle. The two axles feature the additional bracing and updated gear arrangement and specifications of the Juggernaut 2 truck which improve durability and lifespan while reducing the chance of gear misalignment under large torque loads. The 12mm hex at the end of each axle shaft keys into a widened 5-hole hub akin to the Clod Buster hub to increase track width. Main stress-bearing internal gear shafts in the transmission and axles are supported by metal shielded bearings, while the rest of the gears in the truck spin on metal bushings.

The truck may also see use with advancing brushless motor and lithium polymer battery technology for high-power -speed combinations. While the truck may travel at a maximum speed of 7 mph when paired with a 7.2V battery or less than 4 mph in a high-torque crawling setup, a power and speed oriented arrangement may endow the TXT-1 with consistent 40 mph top speeds. However, the torque-roll and -steer prone chassis requires suspension and steering modifications to ensure these runs are truly consistent and manageable.

The lower bumper brackets feature mounting stand-offs for a steering servo on both the front and rear axle, allowing for either a typical front-steering arrangement or a full four-wheel steering setup.

== Tyres ==
The truck's chevron-style tires are similar to those included with the Clod Buster, yet are minutely changed in molding; the wheels are carryovers from the Juggernaut, except for enlarged circular pegs for keying into the widened hubs for improved durability.

== Control ==
The servo-actuated three step mechanical speed control features a resistor with a metal mounting bracket for heat dissipation, and is wired for a single 7.2V battery pack. A transmitter, receiver, and a minimum of one servo for steering and one servo for throttle are required to complete the truck. An enticing feature is Tamiya includes two bodies: one is pre-painted as represented on the box art, while the second is left clear with an overspray film for custom painting schemes. Unfortunately, only one set of decals is included.

== Axle and chassis arrangement ==
As the truck features a straight-axle arrangement, the TXT-1 is particularly adept at RC-scale rock crawling. In short, the straight-axle system allows the entire axle and chassis to better articulate itself over obstructions while efficiently conforming tire contact patches to the ground. As an aside, the wide gear contact patches and durable axle construction make the TXT-1 a very durable platform for either high-torque crawling applications or overall high-power brushed or brushless applications. The truck performs very well with no modifications required on a variety of surfaces, however some choose to lock differentials, change tire and wheel packages, reduce motor shaft-mounted pinion gear tooth count, mount the shock absorbers directly to the chassis and axle (thereby deleting the cantilever assembly), and reducing parts count and relocating electronic components to reduce weight and make the vehicle's weight distribution more advantageous for rock crawling. Advanced setups include cutting the lower portion of the chassis, changing the motor arrangement significantly (single motor setup with an external gear reduction unit), or changing the length of suspension links to modify caster angles and distances between axles and the chassis.
