= Eduard (manufacturer) =

Czech manufacturer

- Headquarters: Obrnice, Czech Republic
- Key people: Stanislav Motl, Karel Pádár, Vladimír Šulc
- Number of employees: 131 (2022)
- Website: www.eduard.com

Eduard Model Accessories is a Czech manufacturer of plastic models and finescale model accessories.

== History ==
Formed in 1989 in the city of Most, Eduard began in a rented cellar as a manufacturer of photoetched brass model components. Following the success of their early products, the company branched off into plastic models in 1993. As of 2006, Eduard's product line contained some 30 plastic kits and more than 800 individual photoetch detail sets. To the plastic modeller community at large, Eduard has become a household word in the field of photoetched parts, and their products are available worldwide.

== Product lines ==
Eduard aircraft kits range from World War I to the present day. Some notable ones include: most of the famous World War I fighters are: Fokker D.VII, Pfalz D.III, Albatros D.III and the Sopwith Pup, while World War II had the: Yakovlev Yak-3, Hawker Hurricane, Spitfire and the Messerschmitt Bf 109, all in various sizes in 1:32, 1:48, 1:72 and 1:144. Their older kits are of good quality, but the newer releases such as the Spitfire IXs and MiG-21s in their "Profipack" releases (including a brassin set, photoetched detail set and painting masks, along with other goodies) are acquiring a reputation as good as or better than the newer Tamiya and Hasegawa kits.
