= Tamiya Radio Controlled Nitro Vehicles =

The Tamiya Radio Controlled Nitro Off-road Vehicles entered the radio controlled (RC) nitro engine (glow engine) powered 1/8 scale truck market in July 2002. Produced by the Tamiya Corporation of Japan, these 1/8 scale trucks are designed for stadium competition. Tamiya's first nitro truck, TR-15t, was introduced in 1994. Second truck was the TGM-01 Mad Bison, released in 2000. Third attempt, Terra Crusher, departed greatly from the previous two. Terra Crusher (TGM-02), released in July 2002, capitalized on the off-road monster RC boom of the time; subsequent trucks include the Wild Commando, TNX (TGM-03), TNX 5.2R, and TRG-01 Nitrage. The trucks perform in competitions for Remotely Operated Auto Racers (ROAR) abbreviated as ROAR. ROAR is the sanctioning body of competitive radio-controlled car racing in the United States and Canada, overseen by IFMAR (International Federation of Model Auto Racing).

== Significance ==
Terra Crusher (TGM-02) was an attempt from Tamiya to break into the American nitro radio-controlled truck market, which has been dominated by such American trucks as T-Maxx from Traxxas. The popularity of T-Maxx was overwhelming and it started an off-road monster RC boom. Responding to the popularity of this new market segment, such other manufacturers as Tamiya, Hobby Products International (HPI) and Associated Electrics developed a line of nitro trucks to compete with T-Maxx.

Terra Crusher had all the major features of T-Maxx, including big tires, 4 by 4 with two shocks per tire, in two-speed transmission, as well as reverse gear and on-board starting system. In addition, Terra Crusher was bigger. T-Maxx weighed 4 kilograms (8.8 lb) 4 kg, Terra Crusher weighed 5.7 kilograms (13 lb). Terra Crusher was offered at about the same street price of $400. To lower the production cost, Terra Crusher had two channel radio system included, instead of the three channel set offered with T-Maxx. Lacking this extra gear meant that reverse was done with a differential gear. T-Maxx reversed by using a gear shift, controlled by third channel. In Terra Crusher, however, one of the central gears had a set of differential gears inside. When the brake is applied, this gear is also stopped, and differential engaged to rotate the connected gears in opposite direction. It was an ingenious solution, however setting proved delicate and complicated, not to mention adding extra weight to the gears. Later models did away with this mechanism.

== History ==
Tamiya's first nitro truck, and the company's first nitro vehicle, was TR-15t, released in 1994. TR-15t, a 2-wheel drive stadium truck, had 0.15 in³ (2½ cm³) engine. RC electric vehicles offered the more popular 4 by 4 system. TR-15t was not popular. Tamiya released its second nitro vehicle, Mad Bison, in 2000. Mad Bison was simply a four-wheel drive on-road car with off-road tires, utilizing already released F-150 body. Its poorly located reduction gear bulged under the chassis to compensate for larger tires caused the vehicle to bottomed out easily, also suspension was ill-suited. It was a halfhearted attempt to offer a nitro vehicle to the market; again it was not a hit.

Unlike its two predecessors, Terra Crusher was designed from scratch to take on T-Maxx, world's most successful nitro truck at the time. New to Terra Crusher were a double wishbone suspension with two shocks per tire, a differential for reverse gear, on-board starting system, and telescoping universals.

== Mechanical design ==
Terra Crusher's was built to compete with T-Maxx. Two extra long shock absorbers were installed on each double wishbone suspension to ensure long soft travel. The two speed transmission and reverse worked differently from T-Maxx's. Differential gears in the center worked as a reverse gear and the two speed had a centrifugal gear change. The two channel radio meant that one throttle servo worked to increase or decrease engine RPM, brake, and reverse gear. This complex throttle design proved delicate to set up. The mechanical design itself was sound. Wild Commando and TNX both have same design, and TNX is a race-winning vehicle.

== Design flaws ==
The Crusher's 175 millimeters (6.9 in) tires proved to be too heavy for the 3 cubic centimeters (0.18 cu in) engine. Each wheel and tire weighed between 500 and 600 grams (18 and 21 oz). A set of four wheels and tires weighed over 2 kilograms (4.4 lb), the weight of an entire on-road car, and bringing the total weight of the truck to 5.7 kilograms (13 lb). Team Associated's Monster GT, has tires with the same dimension, but they weigh much less. Simply by installing Monster GT's tires, Terra Crusher's weight problem could be readily remedied, as TNX in recent years have proved. Its 3 cm³ engine was slightly bigger than the 2.5 cm³ engine of T-Maxx; however, that increase was not sufficient to overcome the doubling of the total mass. Immediately after the release of Terra Crusher, it became evident that the truck's performance suffered because of the weight of massive 175 mm tires and lack of power from its 0.18 in³ (3 cm³) engine.

In addition, L-shaped exhaust manifold decreased the efficiency of the RC truck's two-stroke engines. Explosive exhaust should go to the end of the tuned pipe and bounce back into the combustion chamber, stuffing exhaust back into the chamber to increase power. However, Terra Crusher's L-shaped manifold shape hampered the effectiveness of tuned pipe, further weakening the engine's performance.

== Legacy ==
Tamiya recognized the flaws of Terra Crusher. Only a few months after the release of Terra Crusher, Tamiya released Wild Commando with smaller and lighter tires in the last quarter of 2002. This truck was identical to Terra Crusher, except for the lighter and smaller tires, an improved engine in the FS-18SR from the TNX and a new body. This alone reduced weight from 5.7 to 4.8 grams (0.20 to 0.17 oz) and improved performance. The same small size tires were sold separately for Terra Crusher. However, the smaller 144 millimeters (5.7 in) tires that were better suited for on-road races were not popular for fans of Terra Crusher, who wanted a rugged off-road monster truck.

The next model, TNX (TGM-03), was released in 2004. Its success proved that Terra Crusher's basic mechanical design was a very sound one. TNX is almost identical to Terra Crusher, aside from a few upgrades; notably stronger O.S designed 1.8 in³ (3 cm³, up from 2.5 cm³) glow engine, removal of electronics box and employing much lighter tires. TNX 148 millimeters (5.8 in) tires were smaller than Terra Crusher's 175 millimeters (6.9 in) but bigger than Wild Commado's tires, placing the truck back in the off-road category. The Terra Crusher's reverse gear had required delicate-tuning and was abandoned for the TNX. Terra Crusher's 5.7 kilograms (13 lb) weight was reduced to 4.4 kilograms (9.7 lb) for the TNX. With these modifications, the TNX quickly proved itself a very capable racing truck by winning numerous races.

TNX 5.2R (TGM-04) is basically the same as the TNX, but mounts a larger and more powerful 5.2 cm³ engine, instead of the 3 cm³ engine. Aside from the engine upgrade, Tamiya made a few minor modifications to improve the truck's performance. Weight was further reduced to 4.4 kilograms (9.7 lb). The dual shocks were simplified to a single shock, and universal shafts were also simplified to the dog-bone type universals. The on-board starting system was abandoned for hand-held starting motor, which further saved weight.

Released in 2007, Nitrage 5.2 is Tamiya's the most race worthy truck that was released in the summer of 2007. It uses the same 5.2 cm³ engine, but the truck is redesigned around 5.2 cm³ engine, geared toward adjustability of many parts for off-road racing. The chassis uses shallow tub construction, doing away with bulky support beams from TNX. This lowers the center of gravity, and makes Nitrage more "race ready." Double wishbone suspension allows adjustment of camber angles. The two-speed transmission is also abandoned. Due to the 5.2 cm³ engine's ample power, speed change is not necessary. Aluminum shock towers replaced the TNX's plastic shock towers. Weight has increased slightly to 4.6 kilograms (10 lb) but over all, Nitrage has adopted many lessons learned from TNX's various races .

== The future ==
Nitrage 5.2 is a completely newly designed next generation nitro truck from Tamiya. While its design looks similar to Terra Crusher and TNX, upon close inspection, the adjustability added to the new design is reminiscent of 1/8 buggies.

== See also ==
- List of Tamiya product lines
