= Record Breakers: World of Speed =

Toy car line

Record Breakers logo

Record Breakers: World of Speed were a line of battery operated Mini 4WD manufactured by Hasbro in the late 1980s to 1990s, originally in Japan and then brought to the US. To promote the toys Hasbro created the "National Association of Record Breakers" and hosted races in shopping malls across the country. A syndicated live-action television series entitled simply Record Breakers plugging the toyline aired some of these events.

== The toys ==
Record Breakers were known for their speed, and on smooth surfaces were capable of 20 miles per hour (32 km/h), translating to 500–640 scale miles per hour. The cars lacked the pins or blades which characterized most Mini 4WD cars, and instead were fitted with guide wheels allowing them to run on a track. They could be run independently, but a car outside of a track would inevitably crash into an obstacle if not otherwise stopped.

Depending on the version, the cars contained one or two electric motors running off two or three AA batteries. The single motor cars could be manually switched between 2WD and 4WD, and some allowed the addition of a third battery for more power. Customization and upgrade kits with accessories such as different kinds of wheels and guide wheels were sold, as well as different kinds of tracks.

== See also ==
- Mini 4WD
