= Dash! Yonkuro =

Japanese manga and anime franchise

- Cover of the first manga volume

ダッシュ!四駆郎 (Dasshu! Yonkarō)
- Manga
- Written by: Zaurus Tokuda
- Published by: Shogakukan
- Magazine: CoroCoro Comic
- Original run: December 1987 – March 1992
- Volumes: 14
- Anime television series
- Directed by: Hitoshi Nanba
- Produced by: Hiroshi Sasagawa
- Written by: Takashi Yamada
- Music by: Keita Miyahara
- Studio: Staff 21, Aubekku & Tokyu Agency
- Original network: TXN (TV Tokyo)
- Original run: October 3, 1989 – March 27, 1990
- Episodes: 25
- Manga

Hyper Dash! Yonkuro
- Written by: Hiroyuki Takei
- Published by: Shogakukan
- Magazine: CoroCoro Aniki
- Original run: March 14, 2015 – March 15, 2021
- Volumes: 4

Dash! Yonkuro (ダッシュ!四駆郎, Dasshu! Yonkurō) is a Japanese manga series created by Zaurus Tokuda, originally serialized in Shogakukan's CoroCoro Comic magazine from December 1987 to March 1992. The story focuses on Yonkuro Hinomaru, a delinquent Mini 4WD enthusiast and member of a Mini 4WD racing team who tackles the world of miniature car racing. It is created as a tie-in to Tamiya's Mini 4WD franchise, and it is the first series to center on the franchise. An anime series based on the original manga was produced by Staff 21, Aubekku & Tokyu Agency and aired on TV Tokyo from October 3, 1989, to March 27, 1990. A sequel manga series, titled Hyper Dash! Yonkuro was created and illustrated by Hiroyuki Takei and began serialization on CoroCoro Aniki on March 14, 2015.

== Media ==
=== Manga ===
The manga was written and illustrated by Zaurus Tokuda, serialized in the monthly CoroCoro Comic from December 1987 until March 1992, compiling it into 14 Tankobon volumes. Several spinoff stories revolving the series were released before its successor series was serialized. This, alongside Bakusō Kyōdai Let's & Go!! contributed on the popularity of Tamiya's Mini 4WD franchise in Japan and overseas. Despite the author's death, a sequel manga series, titled Hyper Dash! Yonkuro (ハイパーダッシュ! 四駆郎, Haipā Dasshu! Yonkurō) was created by Hiroyuki Takei (under Tokuda's family approval) and began serialization in CoroCoro Aniki magazine on March 14, 2015, and ending on March 15, 2021. 4 Tankobon Volumes were released in Japan.

=== Anime ===
An anime adaptation of the original manga was produced by Staff 21, Aubekku & Tokyu Agency and aired on TV Tokyo from October 3, 1989, to March 27, 1990, replacing Mister Ajikko in its original timeslot. The series was directed by Hitoshi Nanba and written by Takashi Yamada (Ojamajo Doremi, Jewelpet, HeartCatch PreCure). The opening song is titled "Be Top" by Taku Kitahara while the ending theme is titled "An Endless Challenge" (果てしなき挑戦(チャレンジ), Hateshinaki Charenji) by Taku Kitahara.

=== Merchandise ===
Merchandise of the series were released by Tamiya under the Mini 4WD line of race car models.

== Reception ==
Hiroyuki Takei, author of Shaman King and later Hyper Dash! Yonkuro cited he once submitted a design on a contest held by Shogakukan during his middle school years. Despite not be used for Yonkuro's machine, it became the basis for the Dash-3 Shooting Star. The one-shot autobiography manga Dear Zaurus Tokuda was based on Takei's story.
