= Shunsaku Tamiya =

Japanese businessman (1934–2025)

- 田宮俊作
- Tamiya at a hobby show in 2003
- Born: December 19, 1934; Shizuoka
- Died: July 18, 2025 (aged 90)
- Education: Waseda University
- Occupation: Business executive
- Organization: Tamiya Corporation

Shunsaku Tamiya (Japanese: 田宮俊作; December 19, 1934 – July 18, 2025) was a Japanese business executive. He was the former president, chairman of the board, and representative director of the Tamiya Corporation, a major Japanese plastic model producer.

== Biography ==
Shunsaku Tamiya was born on December 19, 1934, in Shizuoka. He graduated from the Shizuoka Prefectural High School and Waseda University.

Tamiya took over what had originally been his father's sawmill business and made it into one of the largest radio-controlled car and scale model kit manufacturers in the world. Tamiya was known for his pursuit of accuracy in his scale models. He personally photographed and collected full-sized subjects to recreate as models. Tamiya purchased a Porsche 911 and disassembled it by hand in order to understand the inner mechanical design of the car so that he could produce a highly accurate model of it. Additionally, he and his team often traveled to take reference photographs of potential model subjects. In 1966, he and his team took over 3,000 photographs of military vehicles at the Aberdeen Tank Museum in the United States. He also traveled to Israel to photograph captured Soviet tanks.

Tamiya's models debuted at the 1968 Nuremberg International Toy Fair, which helped turn his company into a global leader in the scale model industry. In the 1970s, Tamiya released its first radio-controlled car, a model of the Porsche 934. In the 1980s, Shunsaku Tamiya led the company through a surge in the popularity of radio-controlled car racing as a competitive motorsport. In 1982, the company developed its first Mini 4WD models, which became very popular in Japan. During the Cold War, he was placed under surveillance by the Tokyo Metropolitan Police Department Public Security Bureau for seeking information about Warsaw Pact tanks at the embassy of the Soviet Union in Tokyo.

In 1994, Tamiya was appointed as head of the Shizuoka Model & Educational Cooperative Association. In this position his work on this Shizuoka Hobby Show turned the event into a major commercial and cultural event. This helped turn the city of Shizuoka into a major city in the global model industry. Shizuoka is now known as the "World Capital of Models" and is the leading city in plastic model shipments in Japan. Throughout the city are many monuments designed to resemble plastic model kits.

In 2008, Tamiya passed the presidency of the company to his son-in-law and became chairman. The death of his son-in-law caused him to become president again from 2017 to 2024, at which point he passed the presidency to Nobuo Tamiya, the husband of his granddaughter. He died on July 18, 2025, at the age of 90. A ceremony honoring his life and legacy took place in November 2025.
