= 1:32 scale =

Scale for models and miniatures

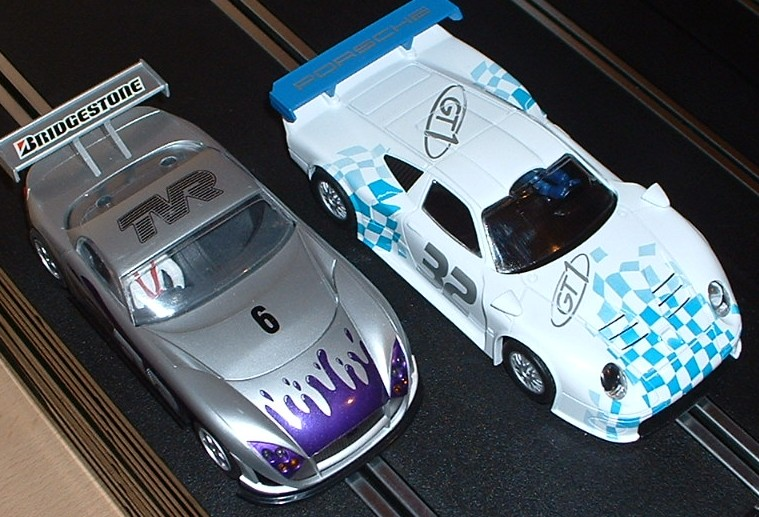
Scalextric 1:32 scale TVR and Porsche slot cars on track

1:32 scale is a traditional scale for models and miniatures, in which one unit (such as an inch or a centimeter) on the model represents 32 units on the actual object. It is also known as "three-eighths scale", since 3/8 inch represents a foot. A 6 ft (183 cm) tall person is modeled as 2 1/4 in (57 mm) tall in 1:32 scale.

1:32 was once so common a scale for toy trains, autos, and soldiers that it was known as "standard size" in the industry (not to be confused with Lionel's "Standard Gauge"). 1:32 is the scale for Gauge 1 toy and model trains. It was the scale of some of the earliest plastic model car kits. It is a common scale for aircraft models and for figure modeling, where it is called 54 mm scale, from the height of the human figure. 1:32 was used for equipment to match 54 mm toy soldiers for miniature wargaming and was common in scale military modeling such as tanks and armored cars until it was largely replaced by 1:35 scale.

1:32 is now considered to be the 'Normal' scale for agricultural models such as Britains or Siku

1:32 scale is also the preferred scale for modeling aircraft as this "large scale" provides the builder with the opportunity to better detail the kit or scratch built aircraft project.

1:32 aircraft models also have their own contest category in modeling competitions as per IPMS rules, and 1:32 scale category is considered the top tier in aircraft modeling contest categories.

1:32 is a useful scale for scratch modelling or railways. As well as standard gauge gauge 1 using 45 mm / 1.772 in track, narrow gauge modellers use 0 gauge (32 mm / 1.26 in) track for 42", 1m and 36" prototype gauges. Also H0/00 track at 16.5 mm is used to represent models of 20 in / 508 mm gauge railways.

Today, 1:32 is associated with slot car scale. A standard for tabletop rail-racing in the mid-1950s, it was adopted by the original slot car manufacturers, Victory Industries and Scalextric. Fewer 1:32 car model kits are manufactured today, making scratch building slot cars quite a bit more difficult than it used to be.

== See also ==
- List of scale model sizes
- Rail transport modelling scales
- Model car
- Slot car
- Gauge 1
