= Tamiya Corporation =

Japanese manufacturer

Tamiya Incorporated

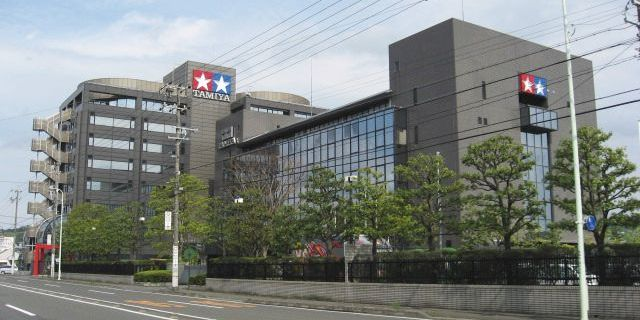
- Tamiya headquarters in Shizuoka
- Type: Private
- Founded: 1946
- Founder: Yoshio Tamiya
- Headquarters: Shizuoka, Japan
- Key people: Nobuo Tamiya (president); Shunsaku Tamiya (former chairman)
- Products: Scale plastic model cars, aircraft, military vehicles, motorcycles, figurines, radio-controlled models, radio-controlled cars, trucks, and tanks; enamel paints, acrylic paints, airbrushes, aerosol paint, marker pens
- Subsidiaries: Tamiya America, Inc. Tamiya Philippines, Inc. Tamiya Hong Kong, LTD Tamiya Europe GmbH
- Website: tamiya.com

Tamiya Incorporated (株式会社タミヤ, Kabushiki gaisha Tamiya) is a Japanese manufacturer of plastic model kits, radio-controlled cars, battery and solar powered educational models, sailboat models, military vehicle models, acrylic and enamel model paints, and various modeling tools and supplies. The company was founded by Yoshio Tamiya in Shizuoka, Japan, in 1946.

The company has gained a reputation among hobbyists of producing models of outstanding quality and accurate scale detail. The company's philosophy is reflected directly in its motto: "First in quality around the world". Tamiya's metal molds are produced from plans with the concept of being "easy to understand and build, even for beginners". The box art is also consistent with this principles. Tamiya has been awarded the Modell des Jahres (Model of the Year) award, hosted by the German magazine ModellFan.

Products currently commercialized by Tamiya include (toy and collectibles): scale plastic model cars, aircraft, military vehicles, motorcycles, figurines, radio-controlled cars, trucks, and 1/16 scale tanks. Tamiya also produces materials and tools, including enamel paints, acrylic paints, airbrushes, aerosol paint, and marker pens.

== History ==
=== Entrance of plastic models ===
The company was founded in 1946 as Tamiya Shoji & Co. (Tamiya Commerce Company in translation) by Yoshio Tamiya (ja) (15 May 1905 – 2 November 1988) in Oshika, Shizuoka City. Initially the company was a sawmill and lumber supply. With the high availability of wood, the timber company's wood products division (founded in 1947) also started to produce wooden models of ships and airplanes, which later became the company's main line of production. In 1953, the company stopped selling architectural lumber and focused solely on model making.

In the mid-1950s, wooden model sales were decreasing due to foreign-made plastic models starting to be imported. This led the company to also manufacture plastic models, starting in 1959. Their first model was the Japanese battleship Yamato. Tamiya's competitors already sold similar models for 350 yen, forcing the company to match the price. However, at this cheap price, Tamiya was unable to recover the cost of producing metal molds, so once again, they refocused on wooden models.

In the 1960s, advance in technology made the use of metal molds no longer necessary to produce plastic toys, so Tamiya was able to release a racecar mini-kit, which financed the production of their next plastic model. To their good fortune, it became a hit. They decided that their second plastic model would be the Panther tank—it had a linear form, which would make the molds simple to produce. They commissioned illustrator Shigeru Komatsuzaki (ja) to create the box art. The Panther gained a good reputation for several of its features: it was motorized, had a good moving performance and was accompanied with a clear instruction manual, which made it easy to assemble. The model was made in a 1:35 scale— which later became the standard scale for military modelling. This particular scale was chosen because it was decided that the tank would hold two Type 2 batteries, despite using just one of them for its function.

=== Metal molds ===
Initially, Tamiya ordered metal molds from outside contractors, but often had delays and unclear pricing, which led to business problems. They decided then to scout metal-mold craftsmen to hire and created their own Metal Molds division in 1964. Starting in 1966, they transferred a number of craftsmen to the Mold Manufacturing Factory. These craftsmen slowly gained the know-how and came to make molds for Tamiya. Today, computer-aided design (CAD) is also used in the development process.

Tamiya's models became renowned for the extremely high accuracy of their molds, which reflected in the final product after assembly. For example, in the early days when the company manufactured plastic models using craftsmen's skills, Tamiya represented bolts very accurately as hexagonal posts, while other companies' products represented bolts as simple hemispheric protuberances. This level of detail and thoroughness with which they produced their models earned them a high reputation, including overseas.

=== Packaging ===
On early products, from 1961 to 1967, the box art was done by outsourced illustrators, including Shigeru Komatsuzaki. These box arts, which expanded the product image and had a feeling of "compositions of achievement" or "a story contained in a picture", further enhanced Tamiya's brand.

However, in an attempt to make the box art more accurate and visually precise, the 1968 racing car model appeared on a white background without scenery. This experiment turned out to be popular, and after that, Tamiya completely switched to white background art on their packaging (except for some aircraft and ship models).

Shigeru Komatsuzaki's box art, which had contributed to Tamiya's early image, has now almost disappeared from Tamiya's products due to the change in box art strategies and the discontinuation of former products.

In the 1970s, some box art of model tanks contained images of items not included in the box. This became a problem when Tamiya began exporting these models internationally, due to false advertising laws. Tamiya dealt with this by erasing the items and retouching the backgrounds.

=== Timeline ===
- 1960 – 1:800 battleship Yamato, Tamiya's first plastic model. Due to the poor sales, Tamiya diverted the product to battleship Musashi.
- 1961 – 1:35 Panther tank, Tamiya's first tank model. Tamiya's famous 1:35 scale originates in the size of this motorized model (using two C batteries), which was 1:35 of the actual Panther tank by chance.
- 1964 – Tamiya established an in-house mold and die department.
- 1966 – Shunsaku Tamiya visited the United States Army Ordnance Museum for the first time for covering the tanks. The coverage result at this time became Tamiya's early underlying data for tank models. After this visit, Tamiya came to cover actual vehicles eagerly in the tank museums around the world, including the Bovington Tank Museum. While visiting the Aberdeen Tank Museum, Maryland, since no pictures or sketches of the classified tanks were permitted, Tamiya employees sketched all they could remember as soon as they left the grounds.
- 1967 – 1:12 Honda F-1; completed with the cooperation of Honda. The next year, this model was shown at the Nuremberg Toy Fair in Germany where Tamiya became the first Japanese model kit manufacturer to exhibit.
- 1968 – 1:35 German Tank Soldier Set; the first product in the Military Miniature Series.
- 1976 – 1:12 Porsche 934 Turbo RSR. Tamiya actually purchased a real Porsche 911 Turbo, dismantled it, and rebuilt it in order to better understand the car. Tamiya diverted the die to make a radio-controlled car (RC car) version of the Porsche 934. Although sale of the plastic model of the 1:12 Porsche 934 was poor, the RC car version was a great success. In 2006, Tamiya choose the 934 Turbo RSR as the product to commemorate the 30th anniversary of Tamiya's RC car series.
- 1980s – Tamiya introduced programmable logic controllers for moving models. These used a 4-bit microcontroller.
- 1986 – Hotshot Jr.; the first in the popular Racer Mini 4WD series.

== Trademark ==
On the release of Tamiya's first plastic model, Shunsaku Tamiya (son of founder Yoshiro Tamiya) commissioned his younger brother, Masao, then a first-year student at Tokyo National University of Fine Arts and Music Design Department, to create a new trademark. He created the logo called the "Star Mark". At first, it was decorated with English. In 1960, with the release of the slot car, the design was changed to its current form. The left red star stands for creativity and passion, and the right blue star stands for youth and sincerity.

== Mascot ==
Between 1984 and 1989, Tamiya had its own mascot called Plastic Model Moko-chan, who has a rabbit sidekick called Rabbi-kun (プラモ, Puramo). Together, they were sometimes titled Moko-chan (and) Rabbi-kun (ja:プラモのモ子ちゃん, Puramo no Moko-chan). Drawn by manga artist Fujita Yukihisa, they usually appeared in various Japanese language pamphlets and in comics with Japan-released Tamiya models. They would teach kids about the various models they were building. There was even a series on how to build them, all in a comic format, as well as its only bilingual series of leaflets titled RC Lecture by Moko-chan (モ子ちゃんRC講座), teaching children RC car care and maintenance.

Although Tamiya no longer uses these characters, they still have a large following with devotees. Nowadays, in the instructions of some plastic 1:35 scale tanks, a tank crewman usually gives tips.

== Publications ==
Tamiya News has been published by Tamiya Model and is an informational, monthly publication about the company's own models. Started in 1967, it was published bimonthly with an occasional special supplement. For a long time, it cost 50 yen, but was later raised to 100 yen. The unique, thin publications were placed in envelopes and sent out via standard mail. Introductory articles on new products, model shops, model clubs, and conversions were included, as well as articles on famous and obscure modelers. A sister publication with articles focused on miniature vehicles and bullet racers, Tamiya Junior News, exists as a free publication (formerly costing 20 yen, but now is available for download as a PDF from Tamiya's website).

Other model-related publications held doll-conversion contests or scenic photo contests, and then they published the results in booklets. In the UK in 1985, Tamiya Model Magazine was launched. It was published initially as a quarterly title, then bimonthly, and finally monthly, as it remains now. The magazine is produced by British publisher Doolittle Media. It promotes new and existing Tamiya products, but also includes the model products from other manufacturers.

== Representative models ==
The early Military Miniature Series differed from the western standard scales of the time and used 1:35 scale. The models had the option for the inclusion of batteries and a gear box for motorization. These models were easy to assemble, looked good after assembly, and had accurate parts. These qualities gave the series a good reputation since its release. However, the option for motorization meant that the models needed to be inaccurate in some respects in order to work as motorized kits. More scale-accurate products which did not allow for motorization were renewed after the Tiger I's later model.

After that, Tamiya's family of products was seen world-wide. Noticing other companies were imitating their ease of assembly and accuracy of parts, Tamiya went a step further and added deformities in order to make the finished models look more realistic. However, some modelers felt these deformities were out of place.

In 2004, the new 1:48 scale series began, and World War items were released at a remarkable pace.

A small-scale 1:700 Water Line Series proudly displayed Tamiya's skill. There are many kits in this series. Kihachiro Ueda handled most of the box art for the Water Line Series. It includes:

- Sports Car Series
- Grand Prix Series
- Motorcycle Series
- Mini-jet Series (after 2004, this was re-released as the Combat Plane Series)
- Warbird Collection

== Main remote-control products ==
=== Cars ===
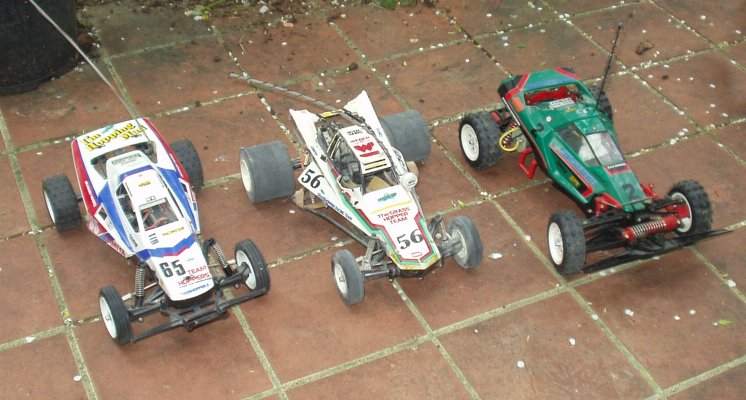
Tamiya RC Cars: Grasshopper II, Grasshopper, and Super Sabre

In 1976, Tamiya entered the RC market with their first RC model, the Porsche 934 Turbo RSR. Today, these models are sold both in Japan and worldwide. To commemorate the 30th Anniversary of this first Tamiya RC model, Tamiya re-released a limited number of models in December 2006, including their flagship model, the Porsche Turbo RSR 934 Racing Edition, which was part of the early phase of Tamiya's RC career.

Radio-controlled model types have included:

- Countach Competition Special
- Super Champ
- Ford F-150 Ranger
- Toyota Hilux 4x4
- Chevrolet S-10
- Hilux 4x4 High-lift
- Mountaineer
- Ford F-350 High-lift
- Can-Am Lola Racing Master Mk.1
- Subaru BRAT
- Lancia Rally
- Grasshopper
- Mighty Frog
- Wild One
- Hornet
- Falcon
- Hotshot
- Boomerang
- Fast Attack Vehicle
- Desert Gator
- Sand Viper
- Avante
- Avante 2001
- Top Force
- Dyna Storm
- Dark Impac
- Keen Hawk
- Avante Mk. II
- Twin Detonator
- Wild Dagger
- Double Blaze
- Blackfoot Xtreme
- Clod Buster
- TXT1
- Tamtech Series
- Terra Crusher
- TNX (Tamiya)
- TNX 5.2R
- Nitrage 5.2
- Bigwig
- Fox
- Monster Beetle
- Celica
- Porsche 959 Paris-Dakar Rally
- Blackfoot
- Midnight Pumpkin
- Super Shot
- Super Sabre
- Striker
- Sonic Fighter
- Lunch Box
- Nissan King Cab
- Wild Willy
- Wild Willy 2
- Farm King
- Tumbling Bull
- Big Wig
- TRF 416X
- TRF 417
- TRF 417X
- Nissan R91CP
- Mazda 787B
- Mercedes C-11
- Jaguar XJR-12
- Sand Scorcher
- TRF 201
- Rising Fighter
- TT-01 series

The TRF 416X, TRF 417, and TRF 417X models can be fitted with a Hydrogen Fuel Cell with the H-Cell 2.0 product, making this one of the only (if not the only) professional quality, hydrogen powered model car. The manufacturer claims enhanced run times of over 4 hours on a single hydrogen charge.

=== Mini four-wheel drives ===
- Ford Ranger 4x4 (July 13, 1982: Mini 4WD) – An early Mini 4WD, released at the same time as the Chevrolet Pickup 4x4.
- Hotshot Jr. (June 16, 1986: Racing Mini 4WD) – An early Racing Mini 4WD.
- Avante Jr (December 15, 1988: Racing Mini 4WD) – Said to be the first appearance of a mini 4WD for serious racing use.
- Sonic Saber (September 7, 1994: Fully Cowled Mini 4WD) – An early Fully Cowled machine, released at the same time as the Magnum Saber.
- Nitro Thunder (November 18, 2005: Mini 4WD PRO) – An early Mini 4WD PRO, released at the same time as Nitro Force.
- Aero Avante (July 14, 2012: Mini 4WD REV) – An early Mini 4WD REV, featuring a new, aerodynamic, and monocoque chassis design.
- Blast Arrow (June 29, 2013: Mini 4WD PRO) – A model inspired by the Le Mans Prototype (LMP) race cars and is fully cowled. The first Mini 4WD PRO to have the MA Chassis.
- Toyota Gazoo Racing WRT/Yaris WRC (July 6, 2019: Mini 4WD PRO) – An iconic rally car from Toyota, It was based on Toyota Gazoo Racing WRT's own Toyota Yaris WRC, debuted in 2017 season of the World Rally Championship.
- Lord Spirit (August 28, 2021: Laser Mini 4WD) – An early Laser Mini 4WD, featuring a chassis with removable front and rear bumpers, and special clear-colored parts to help with the car's stability.

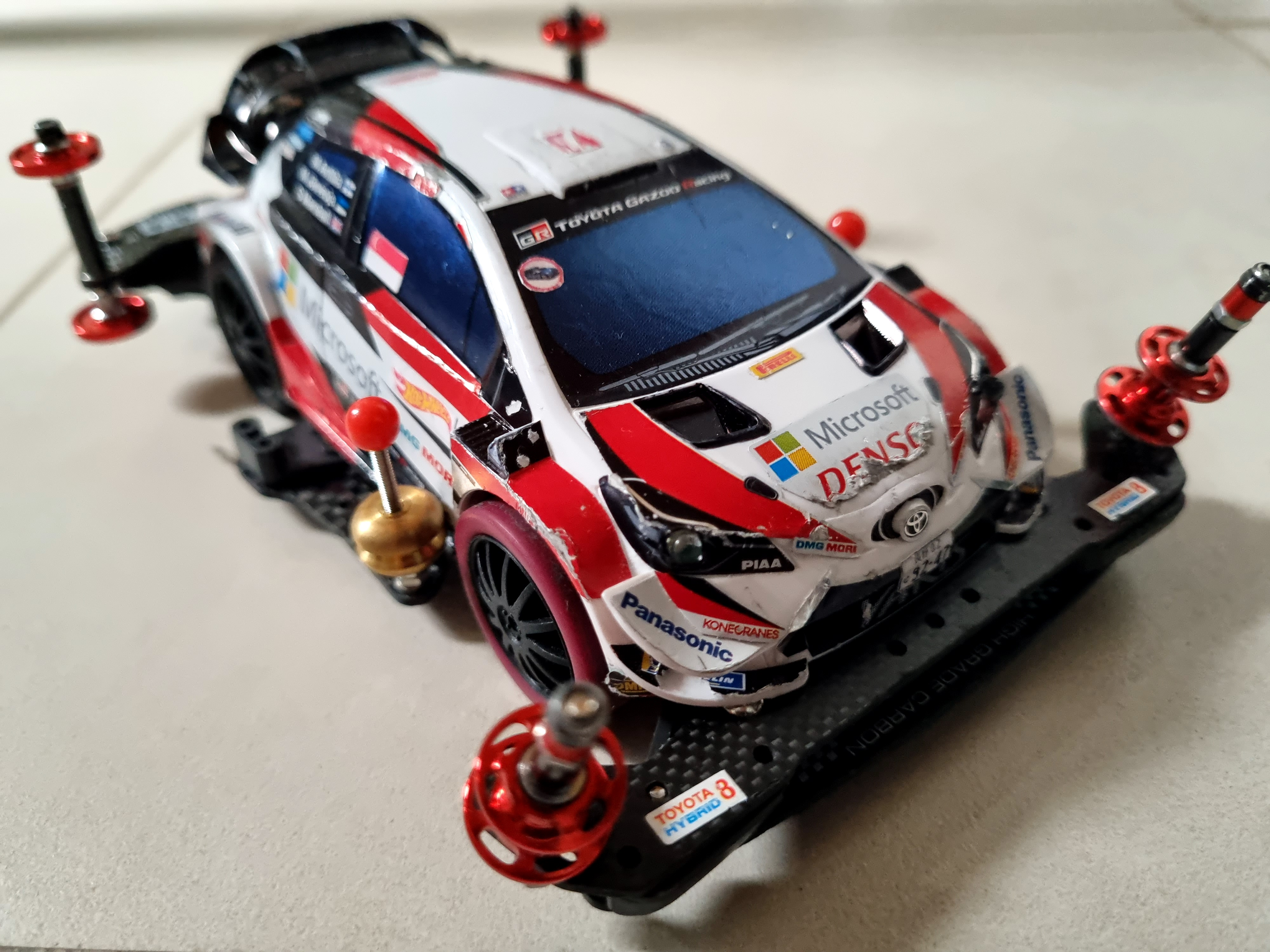
Toyota Yaris WRT with modifications and upgrade kit

They also produce very high end mini four-wheel drive models in the EVO chassis. These are chassis that have carbon fiber and aluminum components.

== Other ==
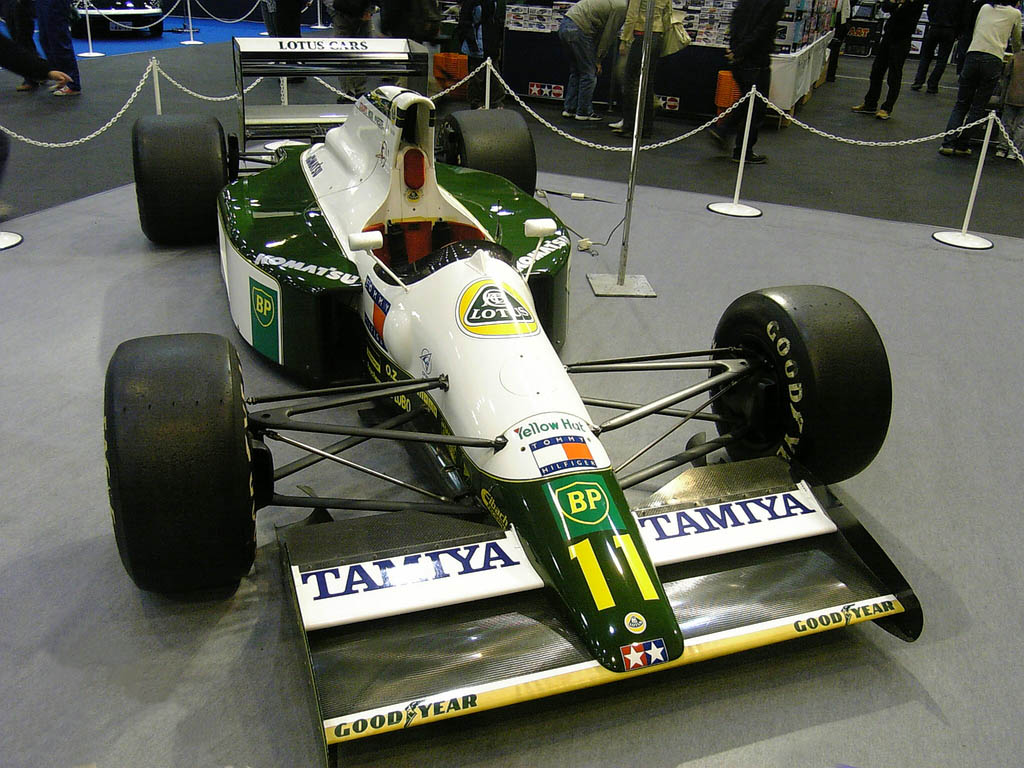
The Lotus Type 102B

Tamiya produces components for moving toys and models (such as their Fun Craft Series), and also produces kits to make simple robots. Another popular product is the older Mabuchi Motor, which runs in water.

In 1960, beginning with the Honda F1 (RA273), Tamiya dealt with many plastic models of Formula One (F1) racecars. This led the company to sponsor Team Lotus in 1991.

Since 1976's Tyrrell P34, Tamiya pays royalties to the teams whose cars their models were based on. Because of Tamiya's reputation for quality, they built strong relations with the teams, even to the point where the teams' well-guarded engineering designs (CAD data) were shown exclusively to Tamiya and no other model makers. However, recently this sort of arrangement has lessened, models are based on alternative references (like news photographs), and royalties demanded by F1 teams have risen. Thus, sales of new models have become more difficult in recent years. Other model companies have taken over the F1 market (such as Model Factory Hiro) and now have the connections that Tamiya used to have with current and past F1 teams.

Tamiya's 1:48 Mini Military AFV, complete even to the point where it was given weathering, aimed to expand the market for completed, painted models. In order to accommodate that, Tamiya employs about 1,200 workers to make finished die cast models which are then shipped to hobby markets around the world. In September 2000, policemen in Cebu City, Philippines began operations to arrest people betting on Tamiya toy car races, which they consider a form of illegal gambling.

== Association with CAVE ==
In March 2005, Tamiya partnered with the game developer CAVE. In June of the same year, they started developing content for mobile phones. Coinciding with releasing the Mini 4WD PRO model car that November, the online game "Mini 4WD Online Racer" and corresponding website were announced. At first, the service schedule was for spring 2006, but because of delays, official service was postponed to summer 2007.

On February 1, 2006, Tamiya and CAVE established Mini 4WD Networks Co., Ltd., a spin-off business dealing with miniature vehicles. In July of the same year, the company began the "MINIon Club" service, a social networking site which also gave special deals on miniature vehicles.

== Overseas subsidiaries ==
Internationally, Tamiya has several subsidiaries:

- Tamiya America, Inc.
- Tamiya Philippines, Inc.
- Tamiya Hong Kong, LTD
- Tamiya Europe, GmbH

Tamiya is a major shareholder of Creative Master Bermuda Limited, a Hong Kong-based contract manufacturer which includes Tamiya among its clients.

== Facilities ==
Tamiya has several large regional divisions, notably in Irvine, California, home of Tamiya America, the North, Central, and South American branch responsible for many of the company's racing developments. Tamiya America also established a world-class racing facility in Aliso Viejo, California—which was the site of several world championship events—as well as an annual scale model contest called Tamiya/Con, the last of which was held in 2006.

Presently, over half of Tamiya's products are manufactured in Antipolo, Philippines. An assembly plant is located in Mactan Export Processing Zone, Cebu, Philippines.

Tamiya Europe is located in Germany.

== Guinness World Records ==
Tamiya radio-controlled models previously held two Guinness World Records, both for distances travelled:

- Greatest distance by a radio-controlled model car on one set of batteries
  - 38.28 km (23.79 mi) by David Stevens of Australia, Templestowe Flat Track Racing Club, Templestowe, Victoria, Australia on 20 April 2013. Car used: Tamiya F104 v2 with LRP 2S Lipo motor.
- Greatest distance by a radio-controlled model car in 24 hours
  - 269.7 km (167.6 mi) by students of Anna-Schmidt-Schule at a route between Hesse and Thuringia, Germany, on 24 July 2011, taking 14 hours and 50 minutes. Car used: Tamiya Desert Gator with LRP Quantum Bullet motor.
  - The school previously held the record for the single battery pack 34.1958 km (21.2483 mi) at Tamiya Raceway Sonneberg in Sonneberg.

== Gallery ==
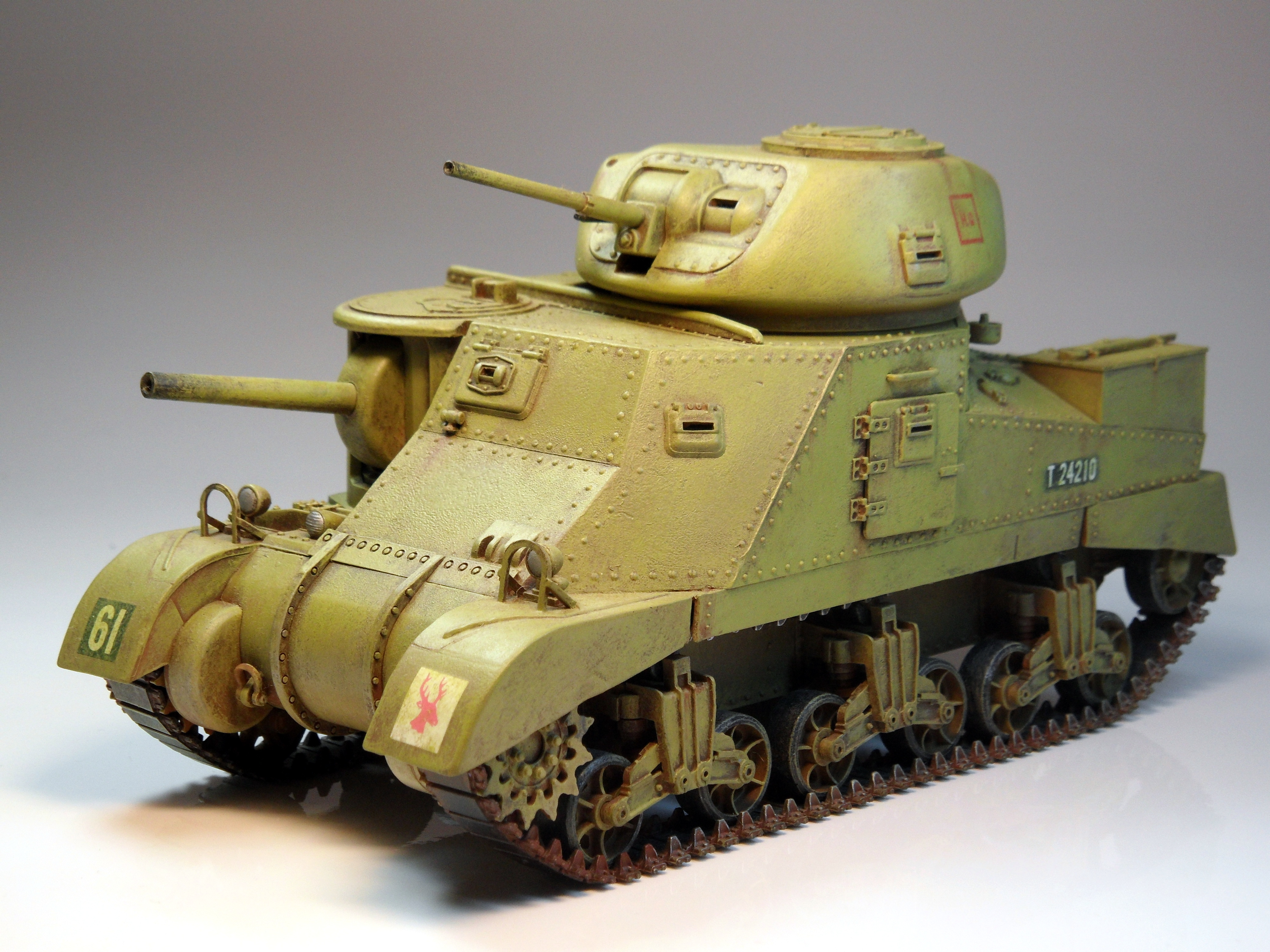
British M3

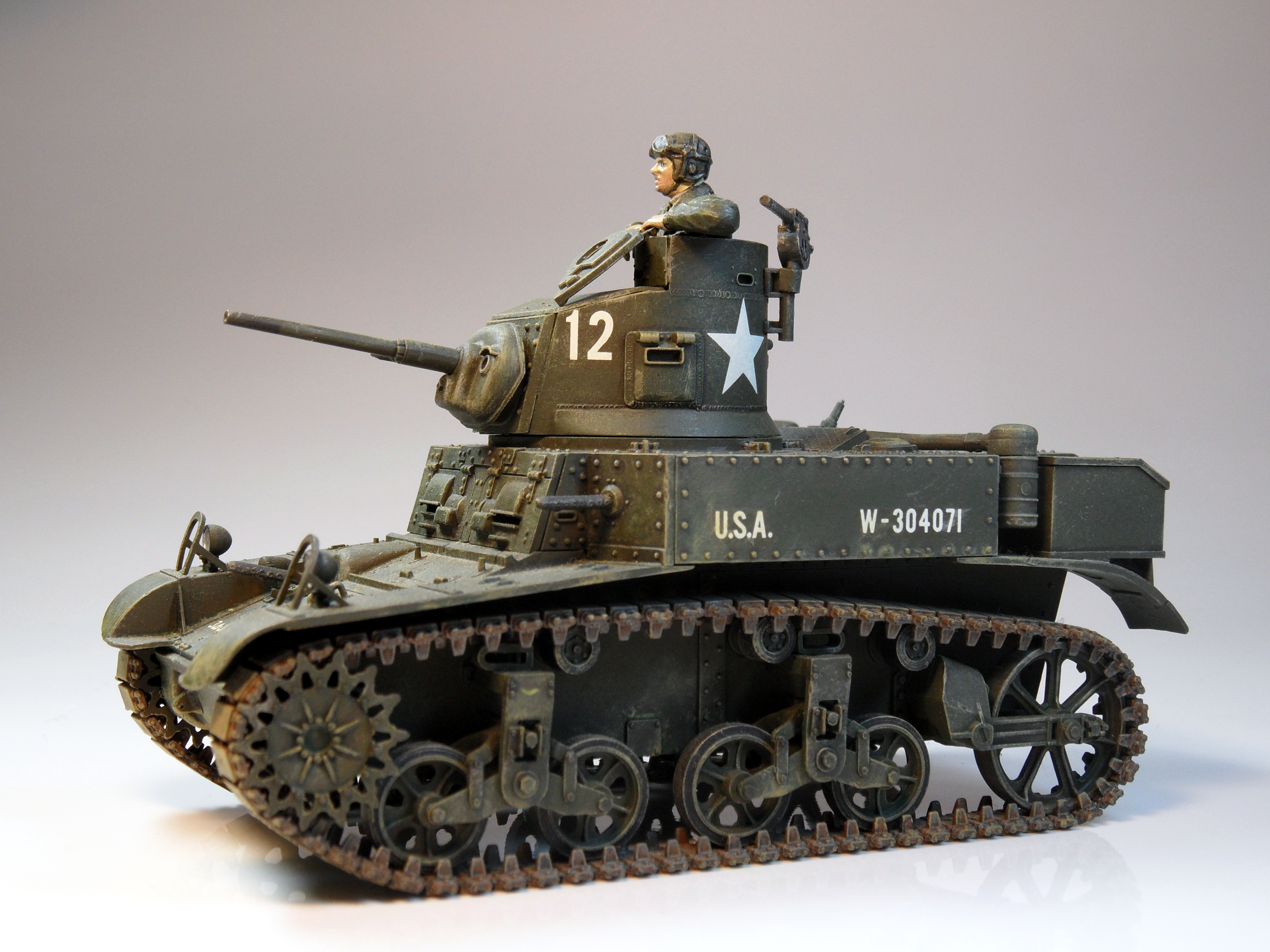
Stuart tank

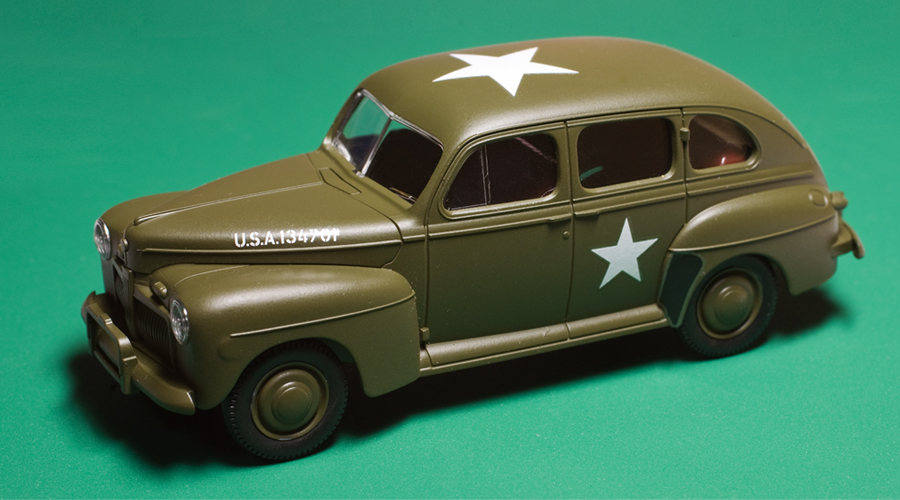
1942

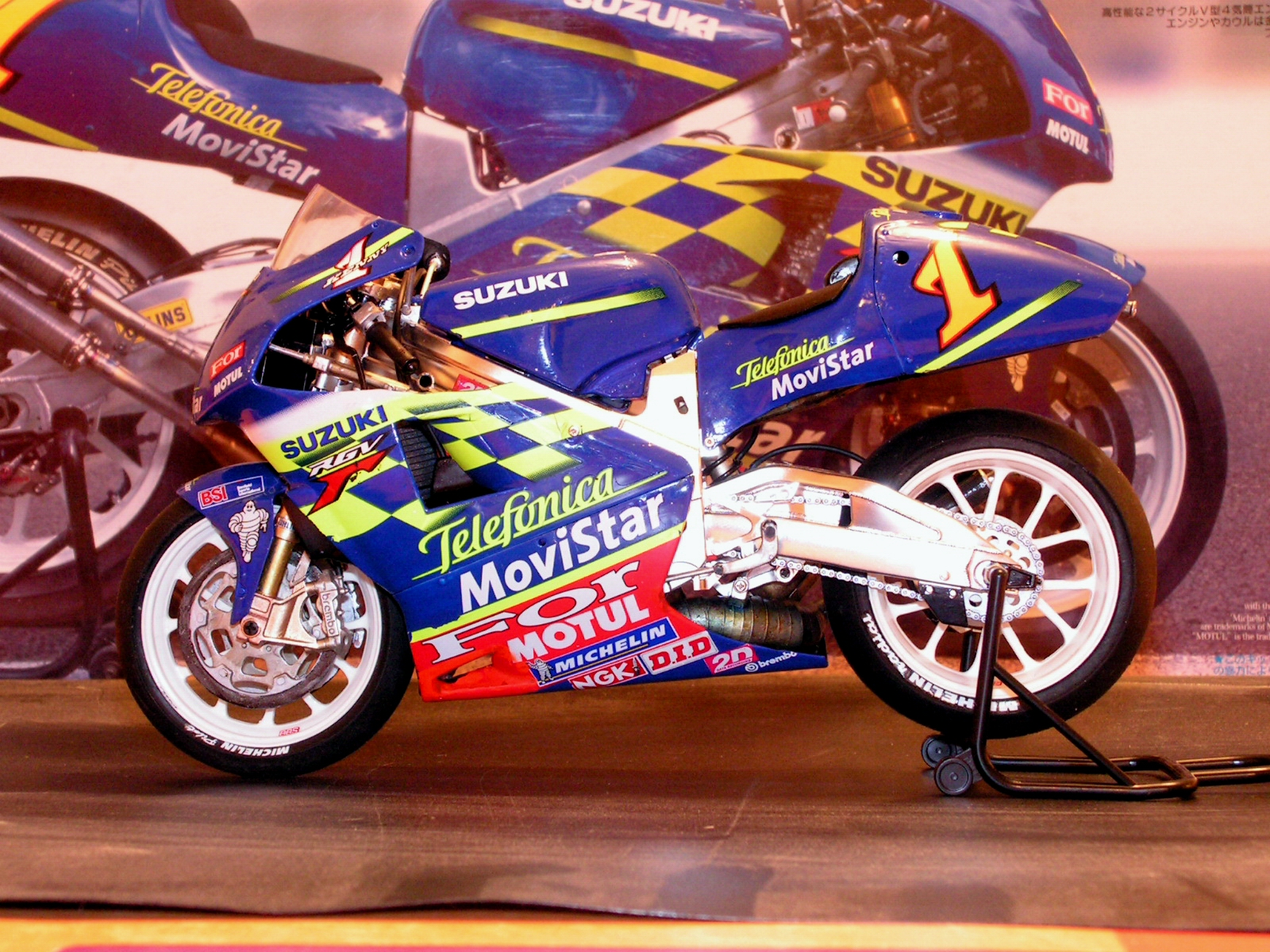
Suzuki motorcycle

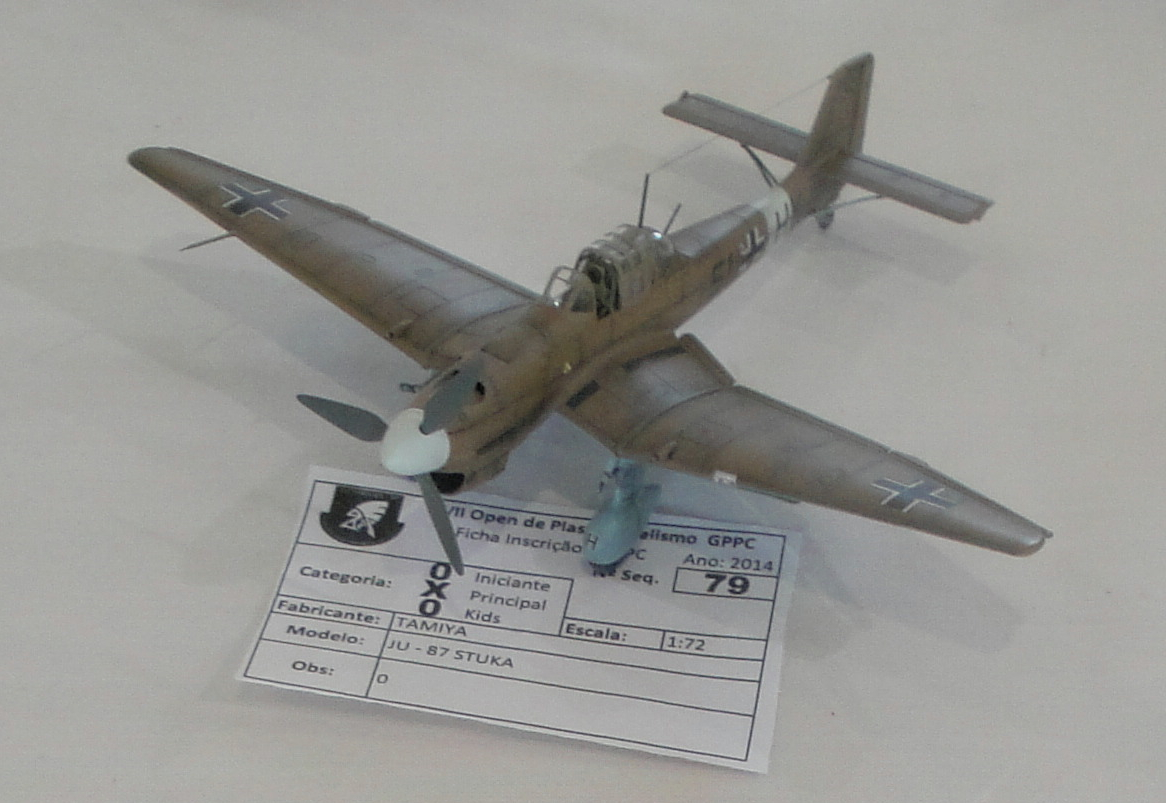
German Junkers Ju-87 Stuka

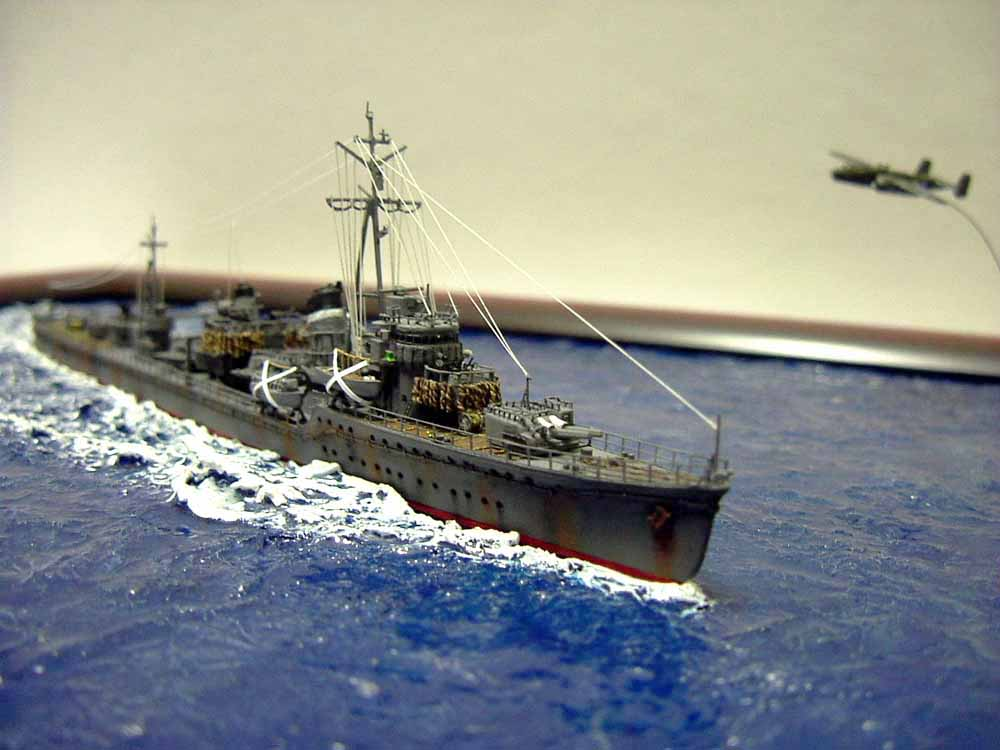
Japanese destroyer Harusame

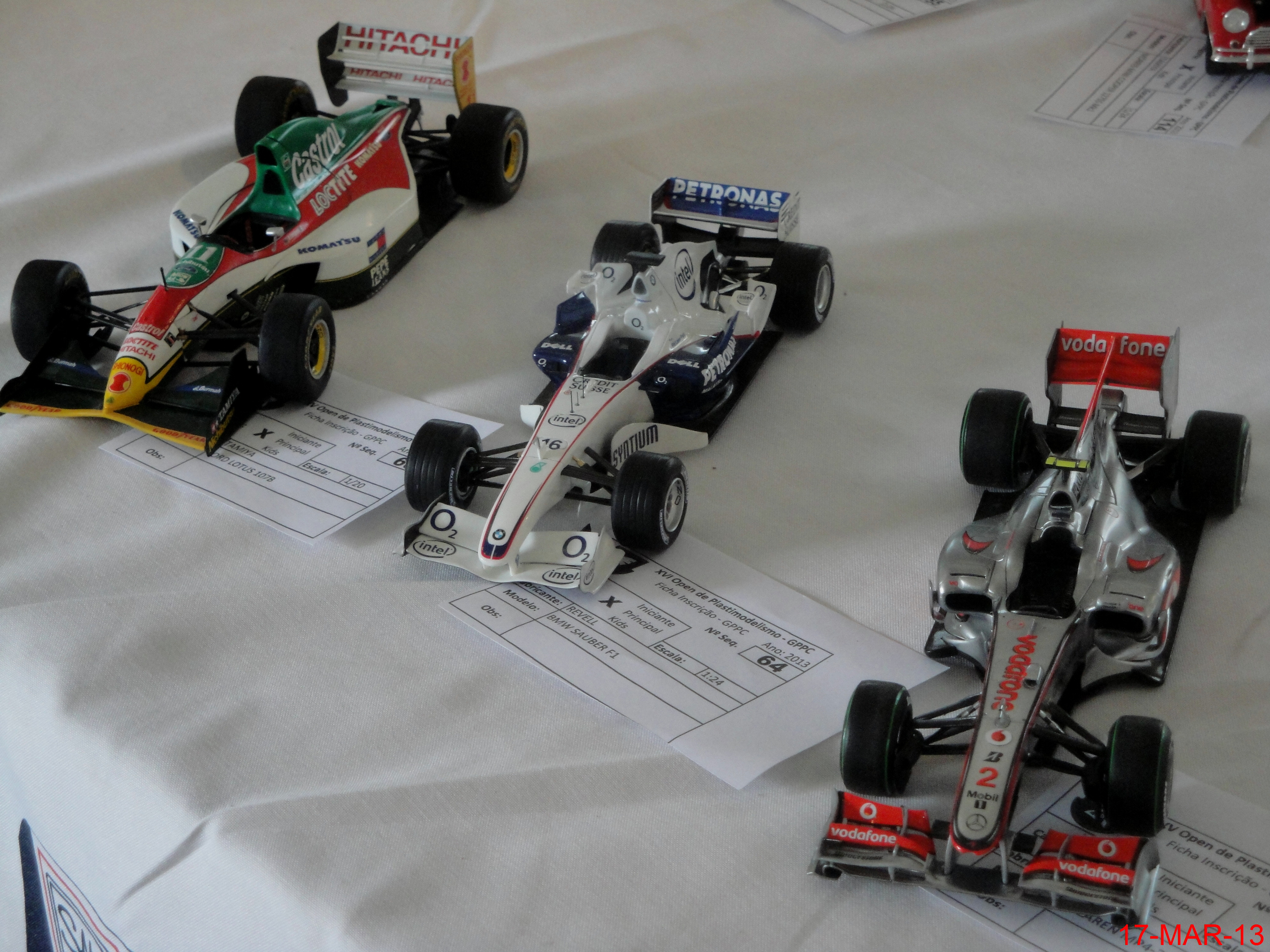
Formula 1 cars

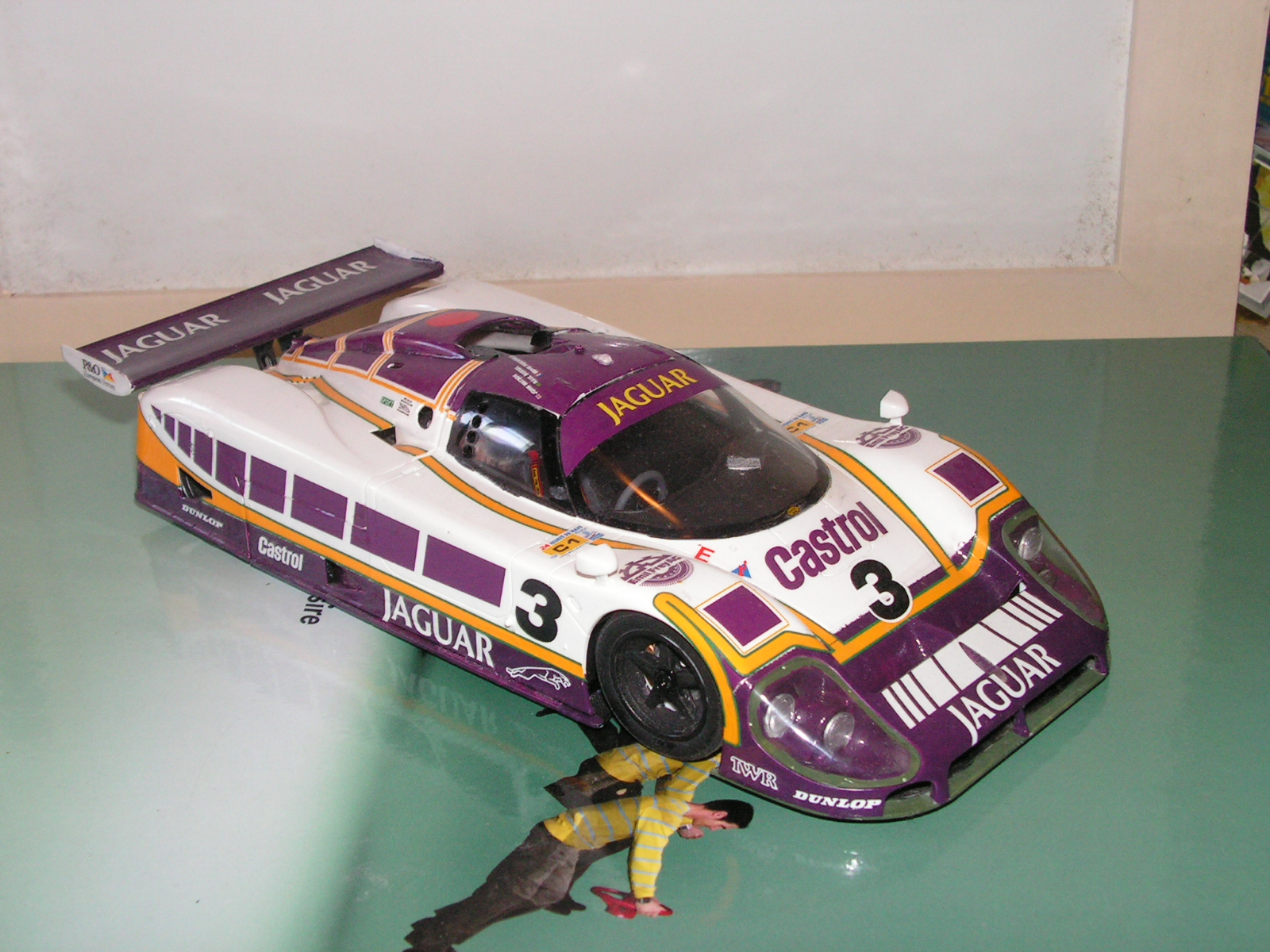
Jaguar XJR9

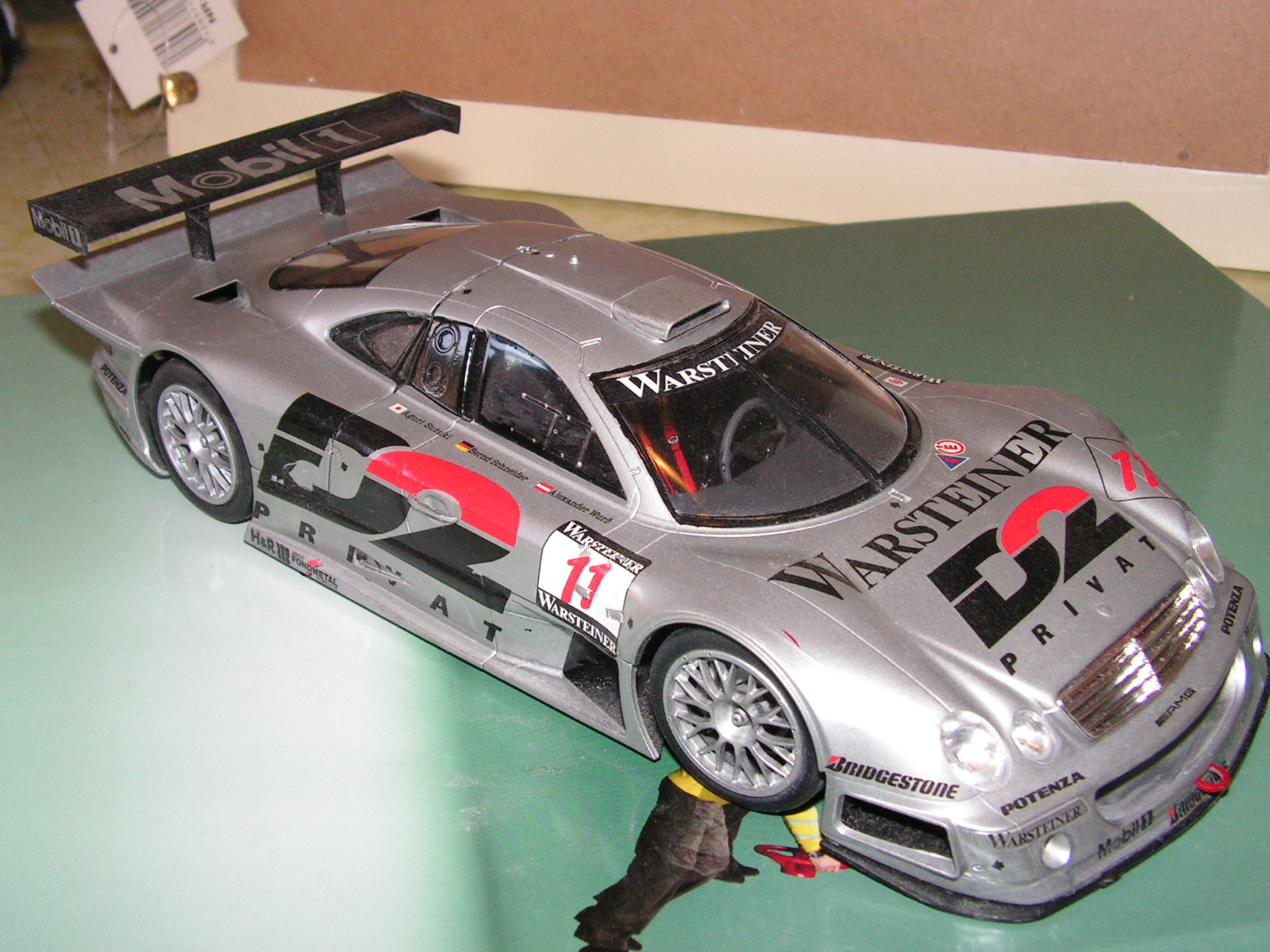
Mercedes Benz CLK

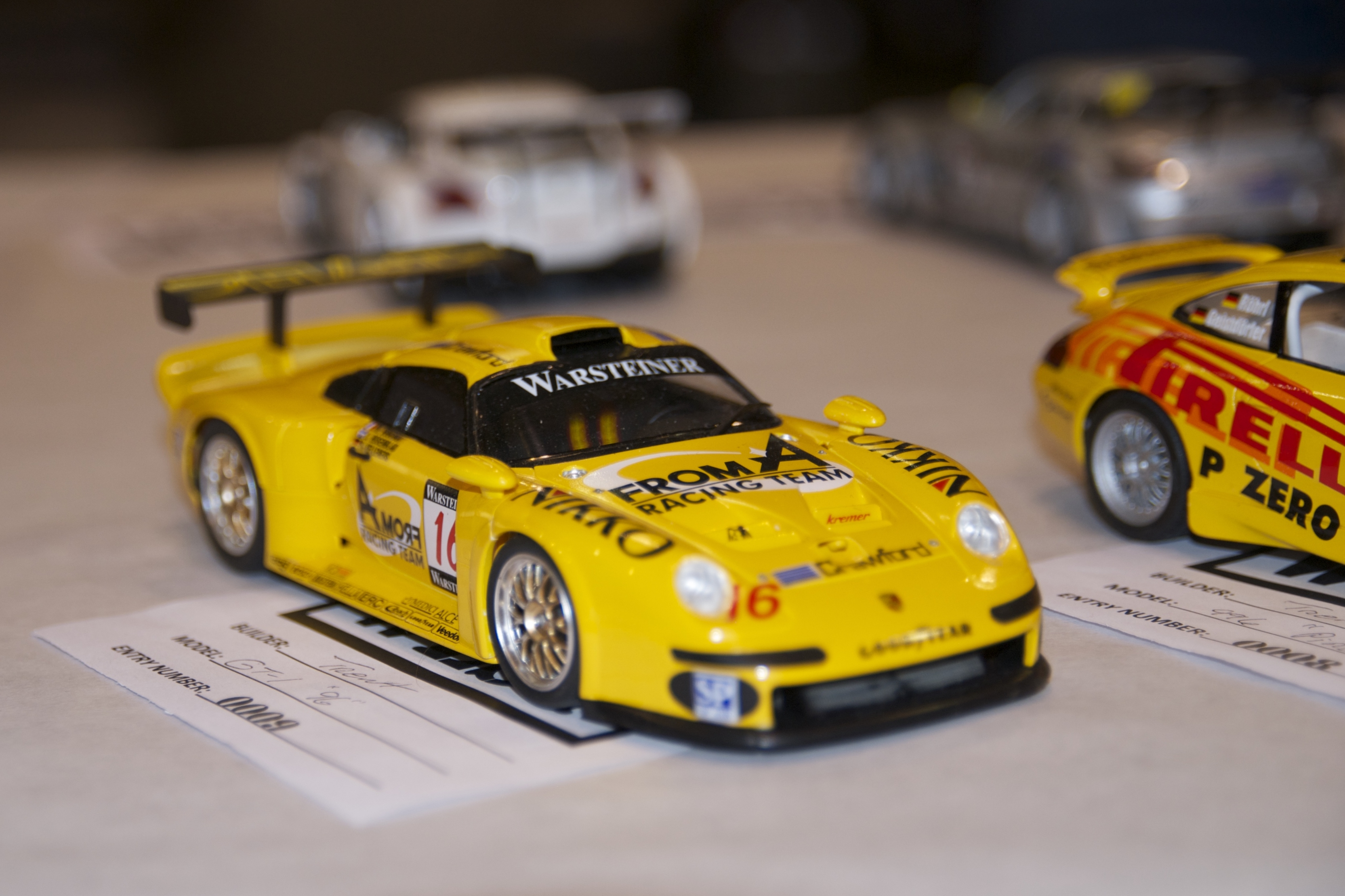
1:24 Porsche 911

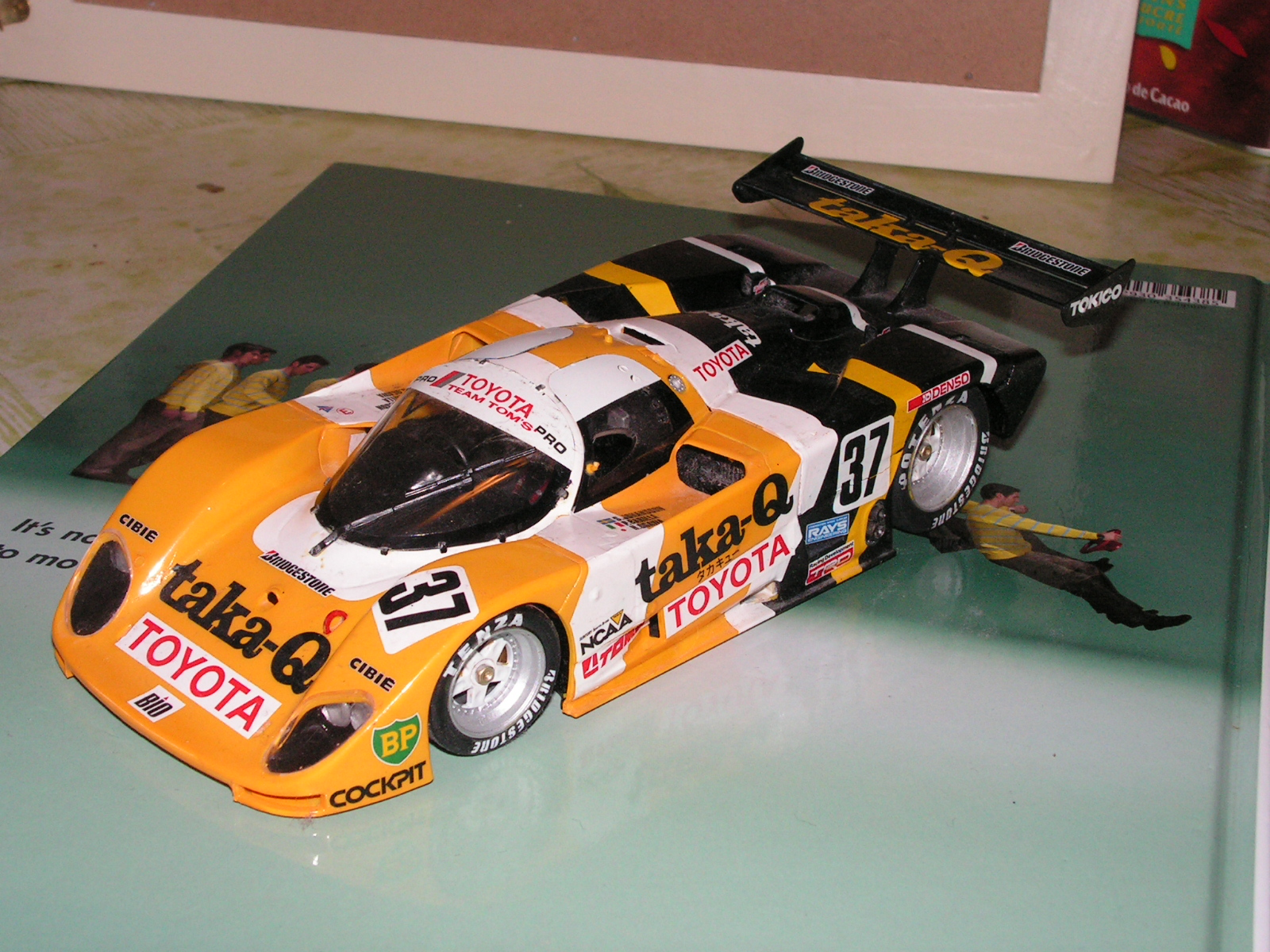
Toyota TS

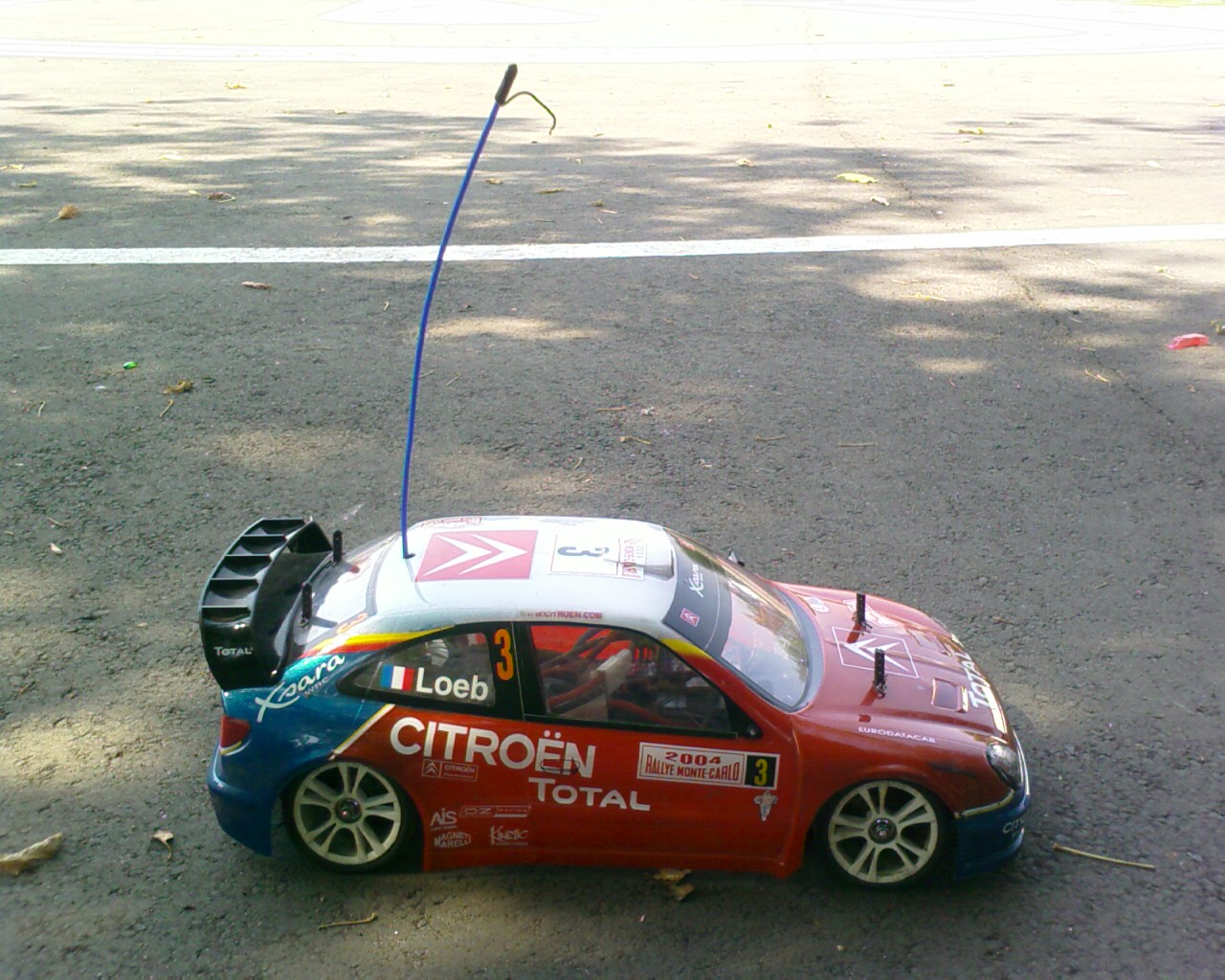
Citroën radio-control

== See also ==
- Italeri
- International Plastic Modellers' Society (IPMS)
- AMPS, Armor Modeling and Preservation Society
- Model military vehicle
- Bakusou Kyoudai Let's & Go!!
- Dash! Yonkuro
- Mini 4WD
- Model car
- Tamiya Radio Controlled Nitro Vehicles
