= Radio-controlled car =

Battery or gas-powered model cars or trucks controlled from a distance

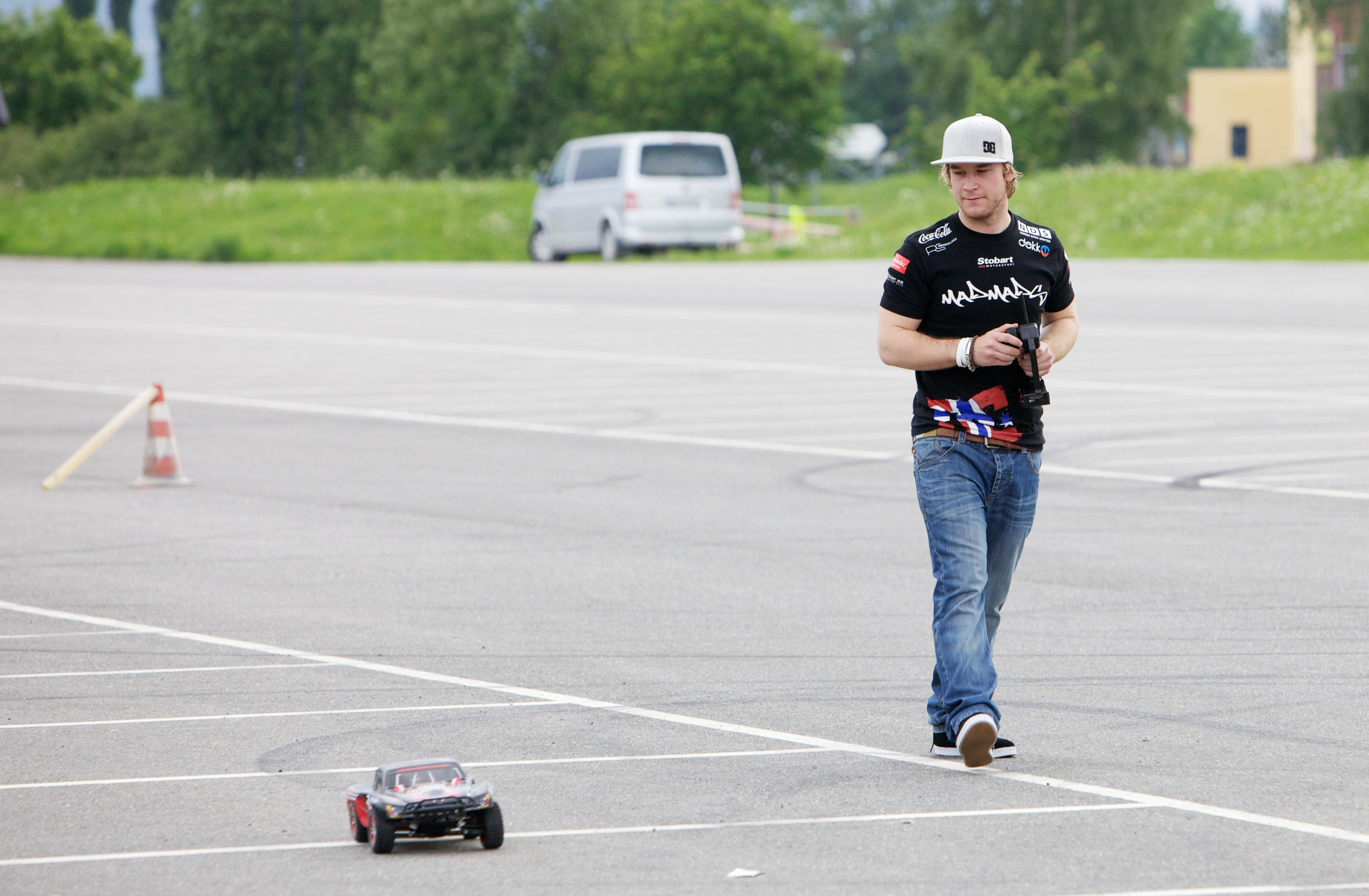
A radio-control car being driven

Radio-controlled cars, or RC cars for short, are miniature vehicles controlled via radio.

== History ==
Radio-controlled cars have existed since the 1940s. A streamlined radio-controlled vehicle won a third prize in Ford Motor Company's 1954 Industrial Arts Awards program. David Swinder of Warren, Ohio used a large control console to demonstrate the operation of the six-foot vehicle to Al Esper, Ford's chief test driver.

Automobile manufacturer studios used scale models to reduce new design development lead times and save money. Among Ford designs executed were the LaTosca, a futuristic bubble-top dream car, and the Mexico, an aerodynamic reskin of the 1955 Thunderbird that was designed to top 200 mph. For these two models the designers constructed radio control systems, adapting six-volt car batteries, convertible top motors, and other full-size components from the Ford parts bins. Along with motive power, braking, and turning, the radio control system also reportedly operated the headlights, brake lights, and turn signals.

In the 1970s, Tamiya released its first radio-controlled car, a model of the Porsche 934. In the 1980s, Shunsaku Tamiya led the company through a surge in the popularity of radio-controlled car racing as a competitive motorsport. In 1982, the company developed its first Mini 4WD models, which became very popular in Japan. Tamiya's Mini 4WD models continue to be popular throughout Asia.

== Types ==
There are multiple types of radio-controlled cars that are suited for different purposes. On-road RC cars are designed for flattened ground, such as floors or paved concrete, while off-road RC cars can be used on uneven and rocky terrain. Ready-to-run RC cars are sold pre-assembled and are able to be used with minimum complications, while almost-ready-to-run RC cars can be customized and reassembled.

Electrically powered models utilize electronic speed controllers (ESCs) to adjust the amount of power delivered to the electric motor. Non-electric RC cars may be powered by a nitromethane (a.k.a. nitro) engine. Electric motors provide cleaner operation and ease of use, while nitro engines offer more true-to-life internal combustion.

== See also ==
- International Federation of Model Auto Racing
  - IFMAR 1:10 Electric Off-Road World Championship
- 1:10 radio-controlled off-road buggy
