= Racer Mini Yonku: Japan Cup =

1989 video game

- Title screen
- Developer: Konami
- Publisher: Konami
- Composer: Jun Funahashi
- Platform: Nintendo Family Computer
- Release: JP: August 25, 1989
- Genres: Board; Racing
- Modes: Single-player, multiplayer

Racer Mini Yonku: Japan Cup (レーサーミニ四駆 ジャパンカップ) is a Family Computer Mini 4WD-based video game developed and published by Konami, which was released exclusively in Japan in 1989.
