= Mini 4WD =

Japanese line of scale model or racing cars

- Product type: Model car
- Produced by: Tamiya
- Country: Japan
- Introduced: 1982
- Markets: Worldwide

Rising Trigger from Tamiya and upgradeable components

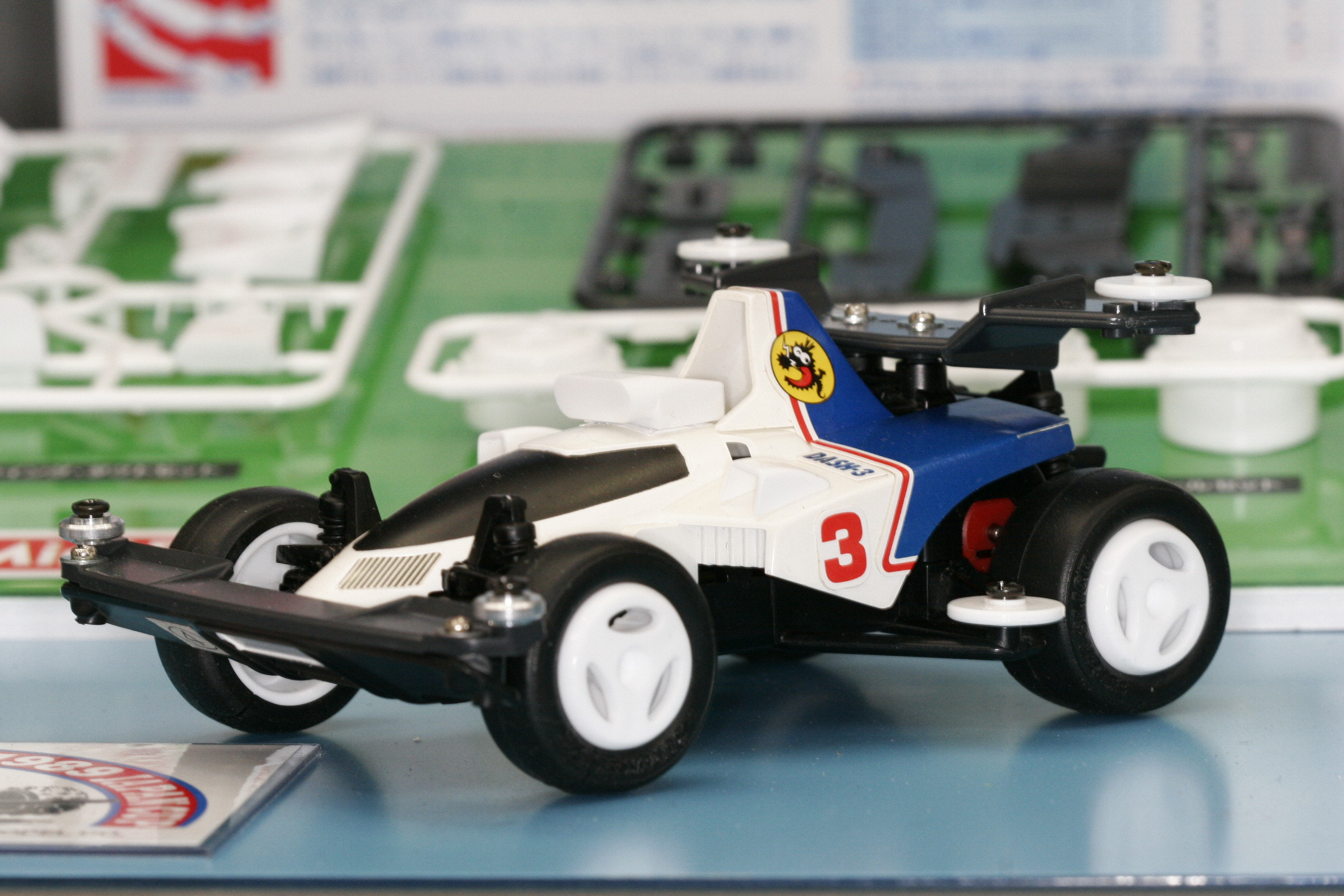
Racing Mini 4WD Dash-3 Shooting Star from Dash! Yonkuro

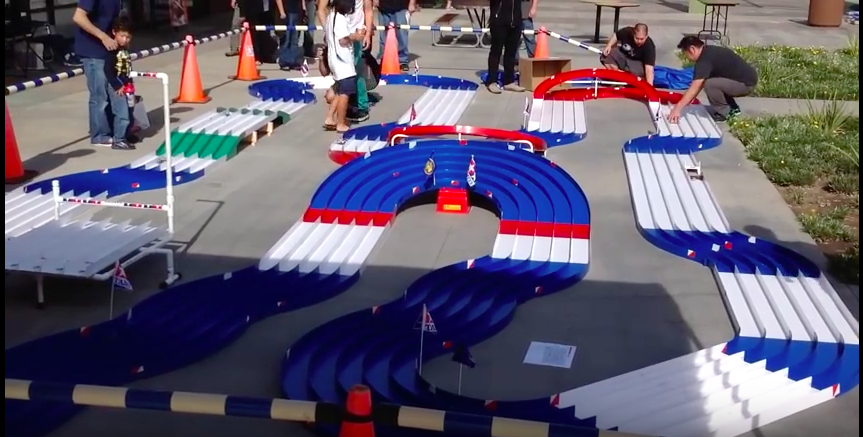
5 lane track taken in 2014

Mini 4WD (Japanese: ミニ四駆, Hepburn: Mini Yonku) is a powered toy car generally 1:32 in scale equipped with 4WD. The cars are used for racing, built to run on a U-shaped track.

== History ==
The Mini 4WD originated in Japan in 1982, when toy manufacturer Tamiya introduced Mini 4WD race cars. A Mini 4WD race car is a 1:32 scale kit featuring four-wheel drive powered by an electric motor using a pair of AA batteries. A single electric motor turns both axles, with one axle being driven by the motor through a gearbox next to it, and the other axle through a propeller shaft; Mini 4WD Pro models do away with the propeller shaft with a double-ended, mid-mounted motor directly driving both axles. These kits snap and screw together without the need for glue.

By the late 1980s, the Mini 4WD hobby was well-established in Japan, and it began taking off in the United States as well. In February 1989, several American and Japanese companies unveiled their versions at the annual toy fair in New York. In late 1989, an average Japanese boy owned eight to 11 Mini 4WD cars. By November 1989, Hasbro introduced their Record Breakers: World of Speed series of cars, imported from Japan. Mattel, Matchbox, and others also released their own versions.

On June 23, 2019, the Tamiya Mini 4WD Asia Challenge was held at the Glorietta shopping mall in Makati, Philippines. Over 200 participants (including 87 foreigners) attended the event. To commemorate the event, Tamiya released a 1:32 scale mini 4WD car of the distinctive Jeepney named "Dyipne".

=== World records ===
According to the Guinness World Records, the world record for Longest Mini 4WD Track was created on November 3, 2019 at 3,191.58 meters at Amagi Dome in Izu, Shizuoka, Japan. It took a Mini 4WD car 12 minutes to circle the entire track.

== Design ==
A standard Mini 4WD vehicle is made of plastic using a Body-on-frame design. The chassis contains the primary components including the AA batteries, motor, gearing, propeller shaft, drive axles, and wheels. The body is purely decorative although some newer designs incorporate ducting to cool the motor. The body and chassis are made from hard plastics like ABS.

Side rollers along the front, center, or rear of the vehicle are used to guide the vehicle around a U-shaped track.

== Upgrading ==
Because of the modular design, nearly all the components can be swapped and change the performance of the vehicle. This allows the owner to customize the performance of the vehicle to the particular track.

Higher specification motors can be used to replace the standard FA-130 type motor. There are three specifications that characterize all motors: RPM, torque, and power-consumption. RPM is the speed the motor provides, and the torque its strength. A higher RPM means higher maximum speed, higher torque gives more acceleration and allows the car to better withstand the difficulties of climbing slopes or running through turns.

Gears can also be replaced with sets with different ratios. Common ratios include (3.5:1), (3.7:1), (4:1), (4.2:1), (5:1), and "Special" (ratio varies but is usually 6.4:1). The higher the ratio, the better the acceleration rate and torque; the lower the ratio, the better the maximum speed.

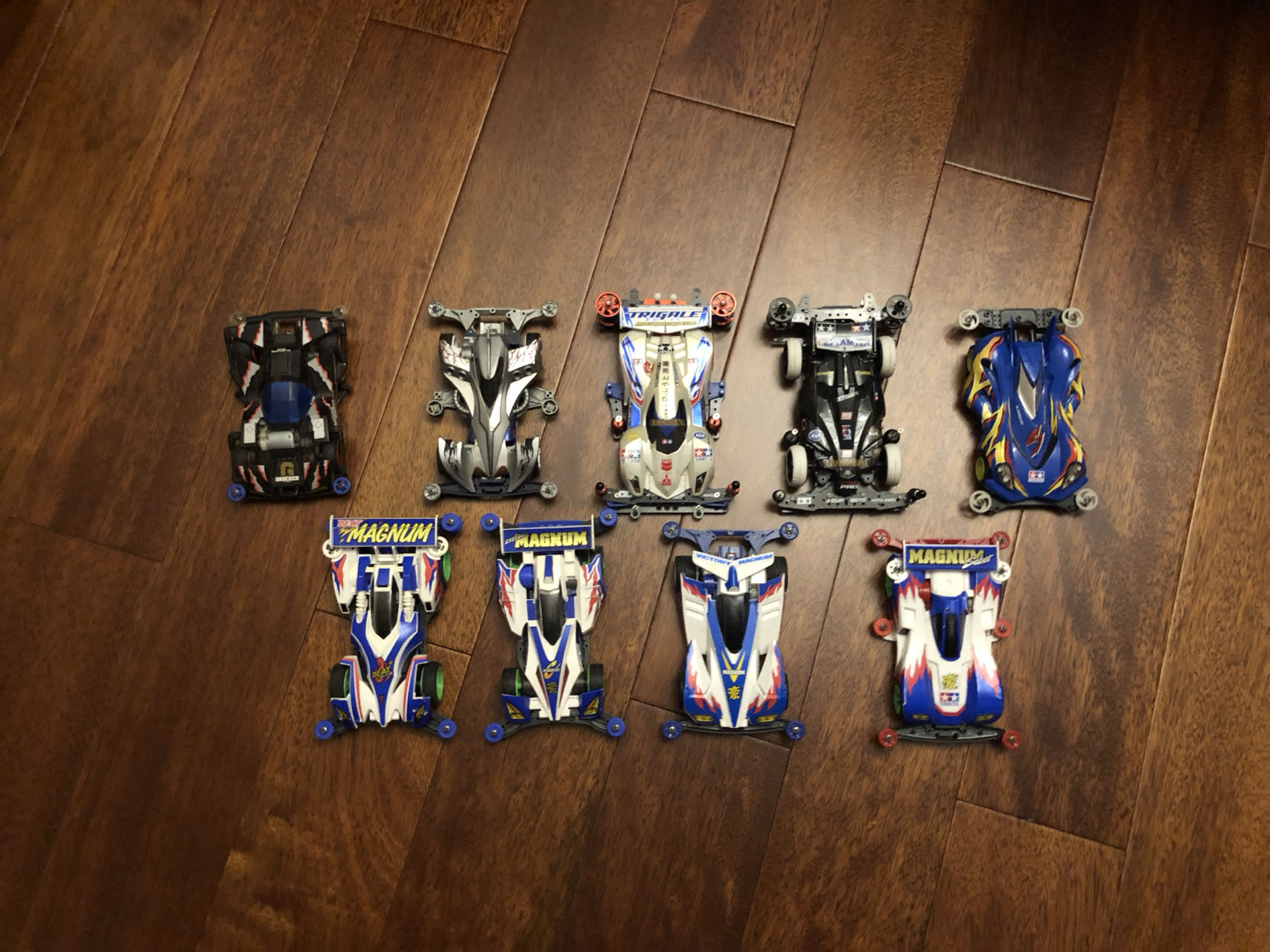
9 modern Classic Mini 4WD

In a standard car, the left and right wheels are on a fixed axle. Special one-way wheels can be added to allow the left and right wheels to rotate at different speeds acting as a differential, to allow for improved cornering performance.

In addition, upgrade parts such as bumper width extensions, stabilizers, and brakes can be added that aid in the car's performance through corners, banked turns, elevation changes, and jumps.

In order to keep race competitions fun, exciting and fair, there are various guidelines when it comes to upgrading and modification of parts, though different race organizers may have different rules and regulations to upgrades and modifications, which can also be further limited depending on the race class.

Race classes determine the type of modification and upgrade allowed for the race. There are different race classes depending on the organizer.

== Street Mini 4WD ==
The Street Mini 4WD (ストリートミニ四駆, Sutorīto Mini Yonku) is a racing sport activity that combines modeling with physical running. The athlete, in this sport, runs and drives a Mini 4WD. The model car is driven using "a guide stick".

The athletes then run alongside their models, controlling them and making them turn left or right using the guide stick.

Originating in Italy in 1994 and affiliate CSEN (italian National Educational Sports Center) from 2023, Street Mini 4WD is a sport practiced in various countries around the world.

The Street Mini 4WD is a physical activity that involves running, coordination of movements and proprioception.

Street Mini 4WD athletes have the opportunity to learn technical basic concepts about how model cars work.

Although the Mini 4WD cars were produced in Japan, the street races have obtain a lot of interest in Italy where racers runs for many years in this kind of competitions as well as in the usual on-track ones.

Street Mini 4WD racing in Italy follows a set of rules based on official Tamiya race regulations, but are not restricted to Tamiya models and Grade-Up Parts; for example, the use of batteries from other brands is allowed.

== See also ==
- Bakusō Kyōdai Let's & Go!!: A popular manga/anime based on Mini 4WD
- Dash! Yonkuro: A popular manga/anime based on Mini 4WD
- Racer Mini Yonku: Japan Cup: A Famicom video game
