= Tamiya Avante =

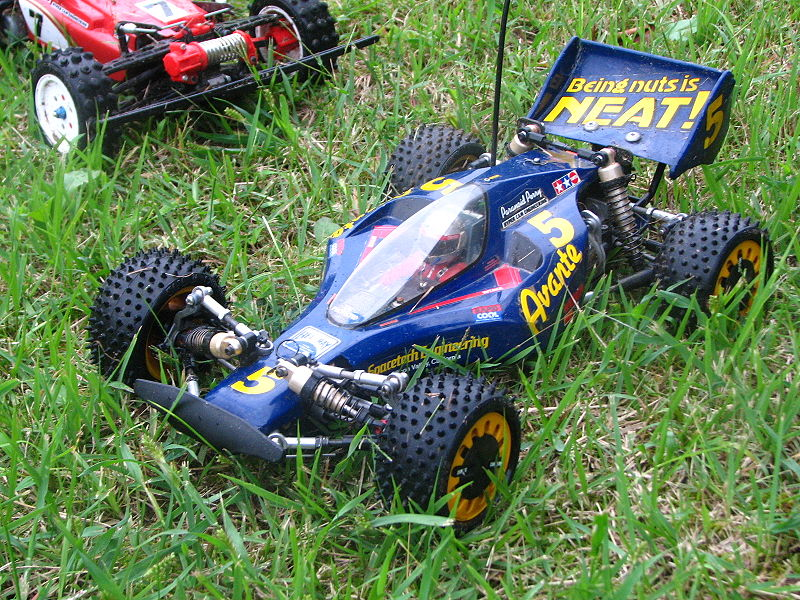
- Tamiya Avante
- Category: 1:10 4WD off-road buggy
- Constructor: Tamiya Corporation
- Designer: Fumito Taki
- Predecessor: Tamiya Hotshot
- Successor: Tamiya Egress

Technical specifications
- Chassis: Two-piece FRP composite "sandwich"
- Suspension (front): Four-wheel independent
- Suspension (rear): Four-wheel independent
- Electric motor: Mabuchi RX-540VZ "Technigold" In some markets without motor and labeled "Special race vehicle". mid-engined
- Transmission: Four-wheel-drive via a solid shaft, unique 6-gear differentials
- Tyres: Rubber pin spike off-road tires with foam inserts

Competition history
- Debut: 1988 JMRCA All-Japan Off-Road 4WD Championship

The Tamiya Avante is a historically significant 1/10 scale four-wheel-drive electric offroad competition buggy released in 1988 as Tamiya's 72nd radio control kit under catalog number 58072. The car was designed by Tamiya's veteran designer, Fumito Taki, famous for introducing Tamiya into the radio-controlled car markets and for its better-known cars, including the Sand Scorcher.

Unveiled at the Nuremberg International Toy Fair that year, the Avante began as a need for a competition car after their past models became obsolete.

== History ==
Although Tamiya had significantly contributed to the market for 1/10-scale off-road starting with the Rough Rider in 1979, as their focus have been entry level and intermediates. Their aged Foxes and Hotshots became obsolete, as a result, the company fell significantly behind in the development of serious race cars such as those from manufacturers Schumacher, Kyosho, and Yokomo.

Starting with a new and somewhat radical design, Tamiya chose to create the Avante from aluminum and fiber-reinforced plastic composite as opposed to the ABS resin used in their previous offerings. It was also intended to be more tunable and adjustable than any other car on the market with its combination of a stiff composite chassis, oversized and tunable aluminum shocks and adjustable upper turnbuckles which allowed for changes in toe and caster. The car was sold with or without a Mabuchi RX-540VZ "Technigold" motor.

Despite the seemingly winning combination of stiffness plus near-infinite adjustability, the Avante suffered more than its share of problems. Aluminum parts were easily broken, the front suspension had a tendency to bottom out on jumps and even the handling was subpar when compared to its competition. In a model with a retail price of US$300 ($817 in 2025), these faults were not easily overlooked by racers and sales suffered badly.

As a racecar, the car was designed to compete in its only race, the 1988 JMRCA All-Japan Off-Road 4WD Championship where it finished 7th, driven by Yoshiaki Sugiyama.

Overall, the Avante did advance the technology of four-wheel-drive offroad racing with its innovative use of exotic materials, ease of assembly and groundbreaking design features such as its motor mounted amidships and parallel to the driveshaft, its use of foam inserts in the tires to increase stiffness and ball center differential and optional front/rear ball diffs, all standard fare on today's models. One feature of the Avante which is not common of today's models is the tool-less wheel nuts that required nothing but fingers to remove making pit stops and maintenance simple and quick. The Avante's basic design was used in future Tamiya offerings less the exotic materials.

The suspension was entirely designed from new rather than being borrowed from existing models.

== Reception ==
In a road test by Radio Control Car Action's Steve Pond, against its primary competitors; Yokomo YZ-870C, Schumacher CAT XLS and Kyosho Optima Mid SE, those of which was tipped to contend against at the 1989 IFMAR 4WD Off-Road Worlds, it was considered the most challenging to assemble in contrast to its competitors, although no less to the Schumacher.

The test claimed the car would have been a strong contender, had it had fewer parts. Criticisms also included "excessive weight" as claimed it "took a toll on acceleration" and "erratic handling prevented it from turning consistently fast laps."

Most damning of all was its suspension geometry as its "most serious problem" with "very limited travel combined with equally poor rear suspension, impedes the car's ability to track effectively". However, it was noted for its performance on smooth surfaces. It also was noted for its sensitive steering as it requires concentration on a straight line otherwise the car will head straight into a wall but this has benefit over tight turns. Despite performing well over smaller speed at moderate speed, another damning criticism was its ability to handle big jumps as often the tail make contact, causing it to end up on its roof.

Despite these criticisms, it finished 3rd, ahead of the Kyosho. As customary of other Tamiya models, the car praised for its instruction manual as also its box artwork.

By that year, it was replaced by the Egress.

== Legacy ==
At the time of its launch, it was cited as a "fashion car", a car that enthusiasts desired to own.

It was credited to being the first model of its factory team, Tamiya Racing Factory (TRF), that help to yield five IFMAR touring car championship titles from 2002. Despite this success and winning numerous EFRA off-road Euros in both 2WD (TRF201) and 4WD (TRF501X and TRF511), TRF have yet to win an Off-Road Worlds title, achieving a 2nd place with Lee Martin in the 2WD class in 2013 with a TRF201XM before disbanding its off-road operations.

Today, the Avante is a highly sought-after collector's item, with new-in-box examples demanding more money than many other collectible Tamiya cars of the period.

The car is considered by its designer Fumito Taki, famous for introducing Tamiya into the radio-controlled car markets as well as a number of cars including the Sand Scorcher as his favorite designs.

A tie-in manga to the model, as well its Mini 4WD adaptation (the Avante Jr.), titled Moero! Avante Kyōdai (燃えろ!アバンテ兄弟) was written by Tetsuhiro Koshita (who later created Bakusō Kyōdai Let's & Go!!). It was serialized in Shogakukan's CoroCoro Comic in 1989.

== Avante Mk. II ==
A competitive new sport/racing model, the Avante Mk. II, is based on Tamiya's DF-03 monocoque chassis topped with a Lexan body evoking the original car.

== Avante 2011 ==
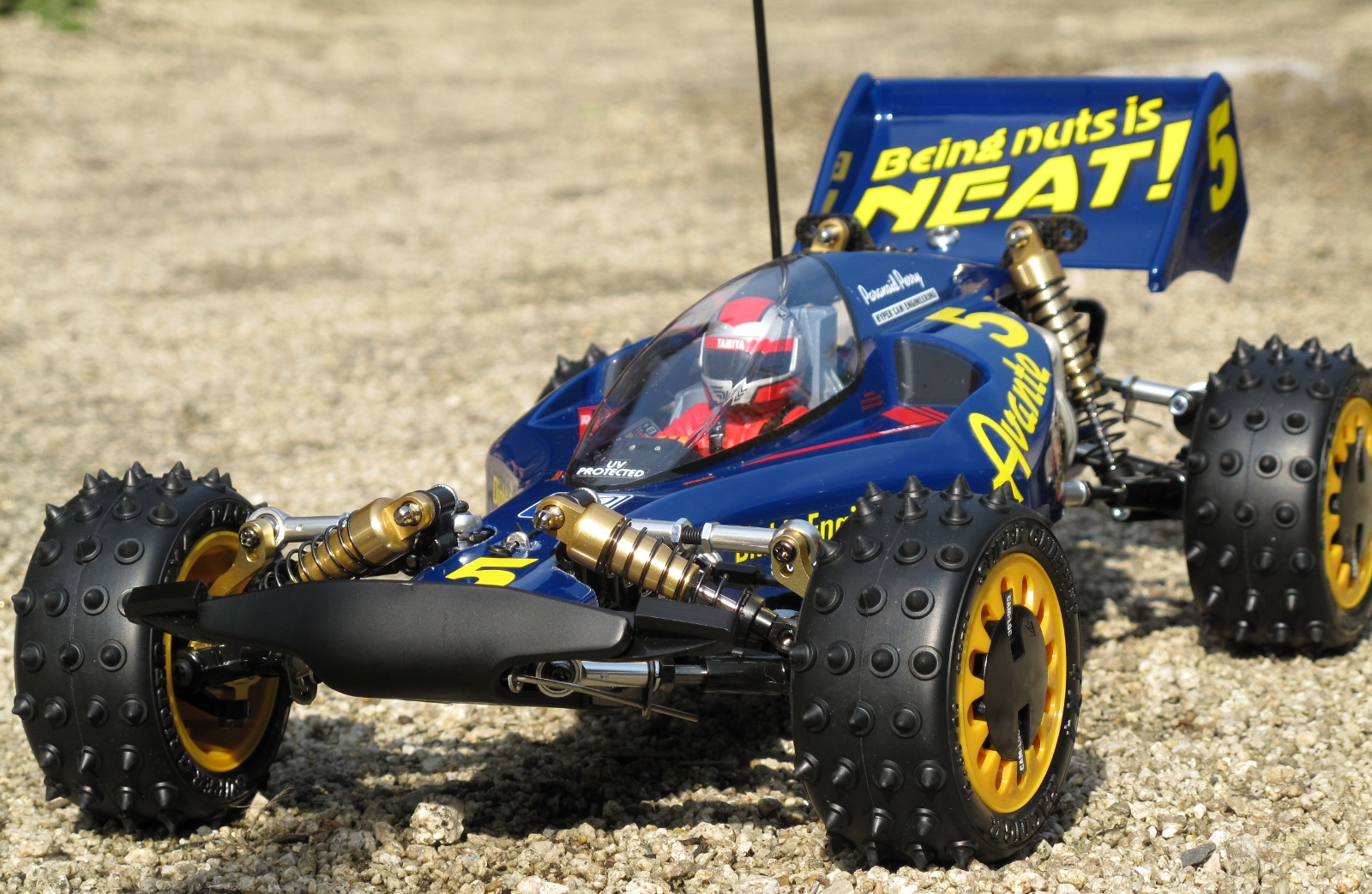
Avante 2011 reissue

In 2011, Tamiya re-released the Avante, and in 2012 released a special limited edition Black Special of the re-released Avante 2011.

== Specifications ==
- Shock absorbers: Aluminum, oil-filled, fully adjustable
