= 1:10 radio-controlled off-road buggy =

1:10 scale radio-controlled dune buggy for off-road racing

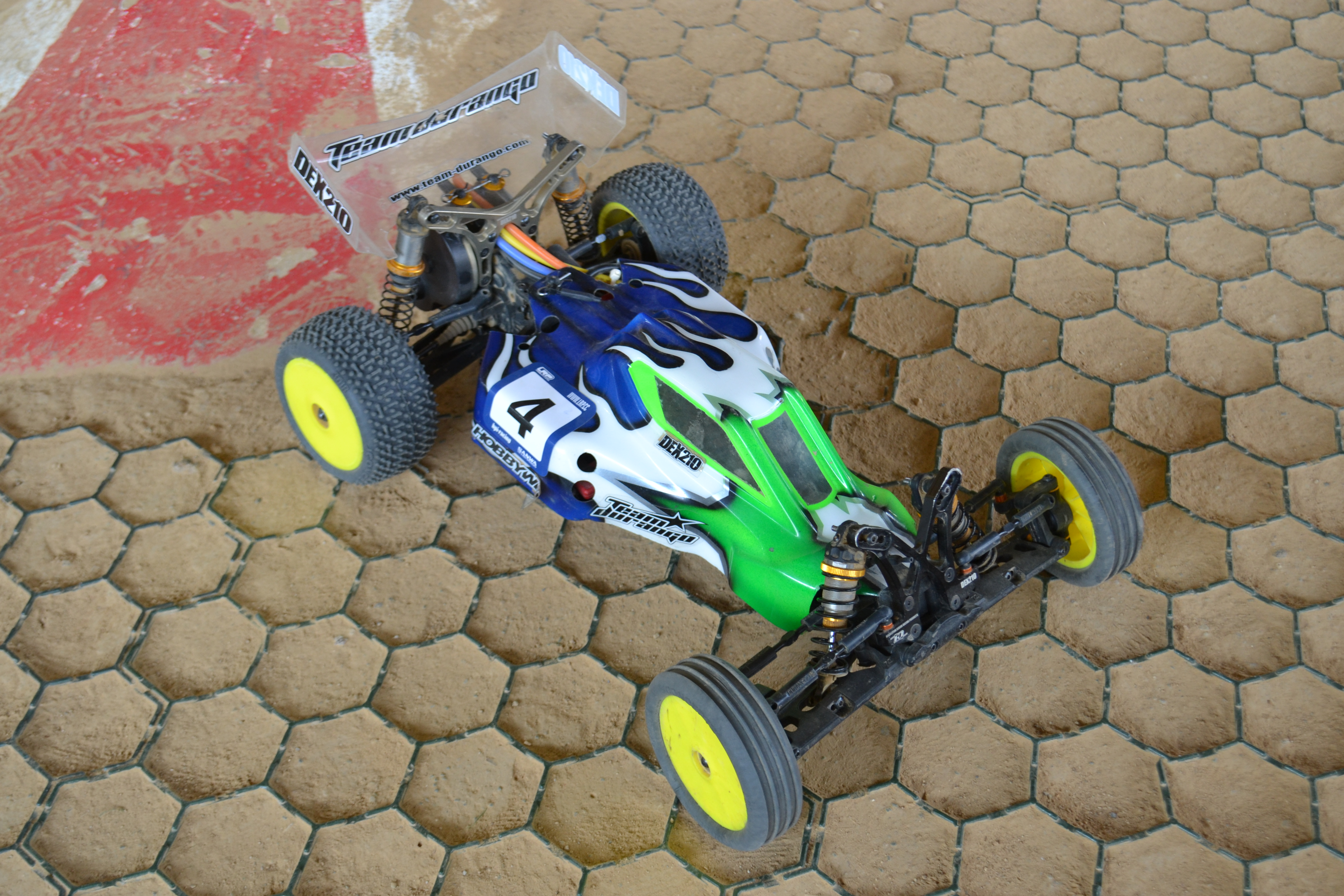
2WD

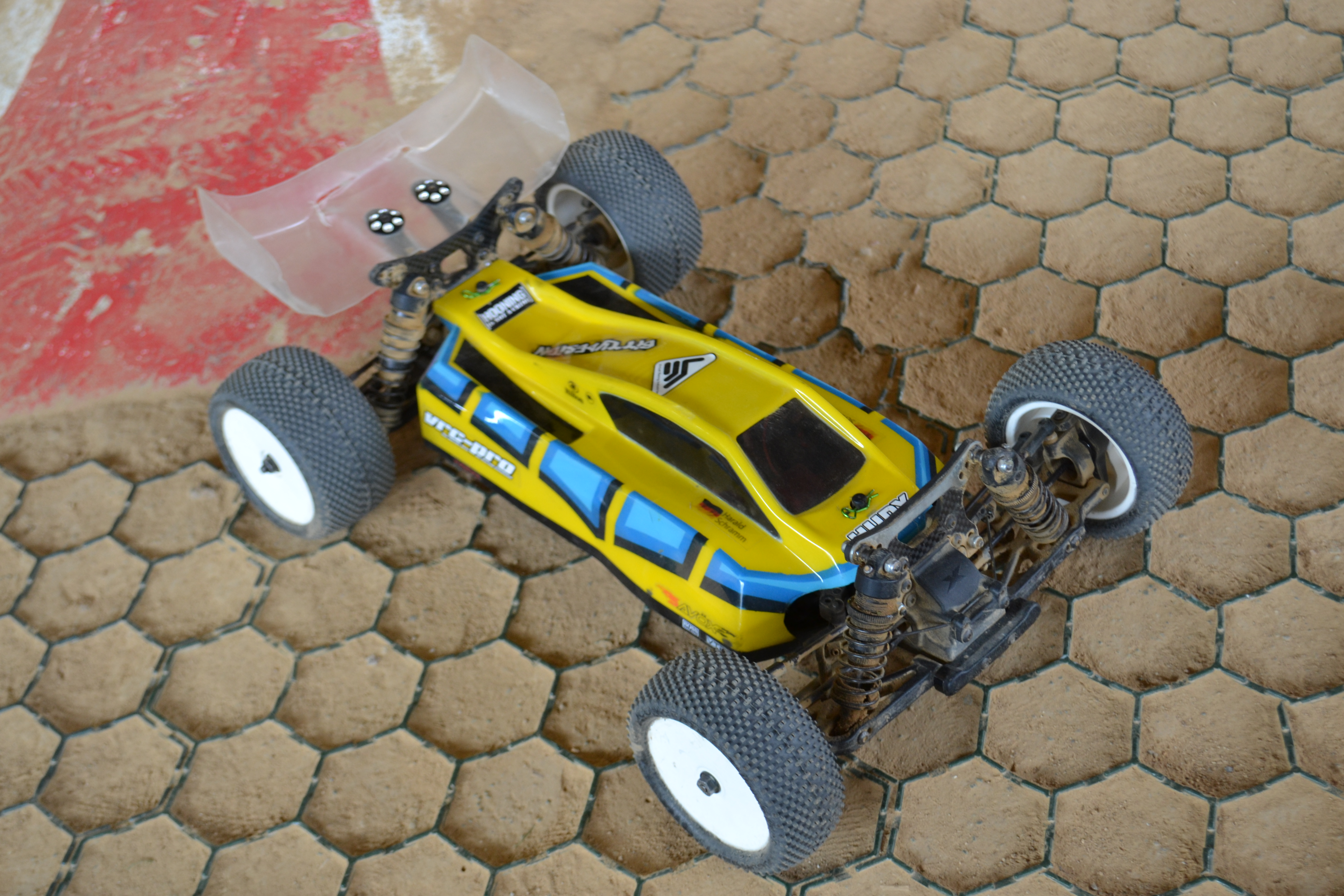
4WD

Two common types of 1:10 R/C buggies differing by their body styles and front wheel widths

A 1:10 radio-controlled off-road buggy is a 1:10 scale radio-controlled dune buggy designed for off-road racing. These cars are based on their full-scale equivalents that are commonly found in desert racing. The buggies are split into two race categories, two (2WD) and four-wheel drive (4WD). These can easily be distinguished visually by their wheel size at the front. Cars are typically electric powered, but nitro versions do exist but are less common because racing classes exist for electric cars. The class is inexpensive and similar to a number of other classes, and this makes them popular with newcomers. The cars are also known as 1/10 off-road.

The class was created by Kyosho as a miniature version of their 1:8 scale buggy and popularized by its archrival Tamiya, the latter after witnessing an off-road race at the Baja Peninsula on a business trip. It became popularized in the United States as a racing class, where they helped to lead the radio-controlled car market in the 1980s before the touring car class suddenly took over for the next decade with many manufacturers abandoning the off-road class as a result.

The Deutsche Meisterschaften (in West Germany) and ROAR Nationals (in North America) were amongst the first to host an official national championship a year before the International Federation of Model Auto Racing (IFMAR) hosted their official world championship in 1985.

1984 saw an introduction of 4WD cars that offered better traction thus 2WD car owners found themselves being forced to compete against its all-wheeled counterpart, resulting in the unlimited/modified category being split into its respective drivetrain classes. This division was first adopted by Remotely Operated Auto Racers (ROAR) and Japan Model Racing Car Association (JMRCA) in 1986 to become used in the Worlds in 1987 then became widely used.

By the turn of the millennium, the off-road buggy market regained its market space, whilst continuing to compete with the touring car market, which originally shared the same chassis as well as its 1:8 ancestors.

Dirt tracks have been the traditional choice of surfaces since the beginning but with regular maintenance and inconsistent lap times through wear and tear, the use of carpets and artificial turfs have become more widely used, the latter being the controversial choice of surface for the 2015 IFMAR 1:10 Electric Off-Road World Championship, ending a 30-year tradition of dirt track use.

Apart from the touring car class, the off-road buggies have branched out into other classes including stadium trucks, monster trucks and Short Course Trucks.

== History ==
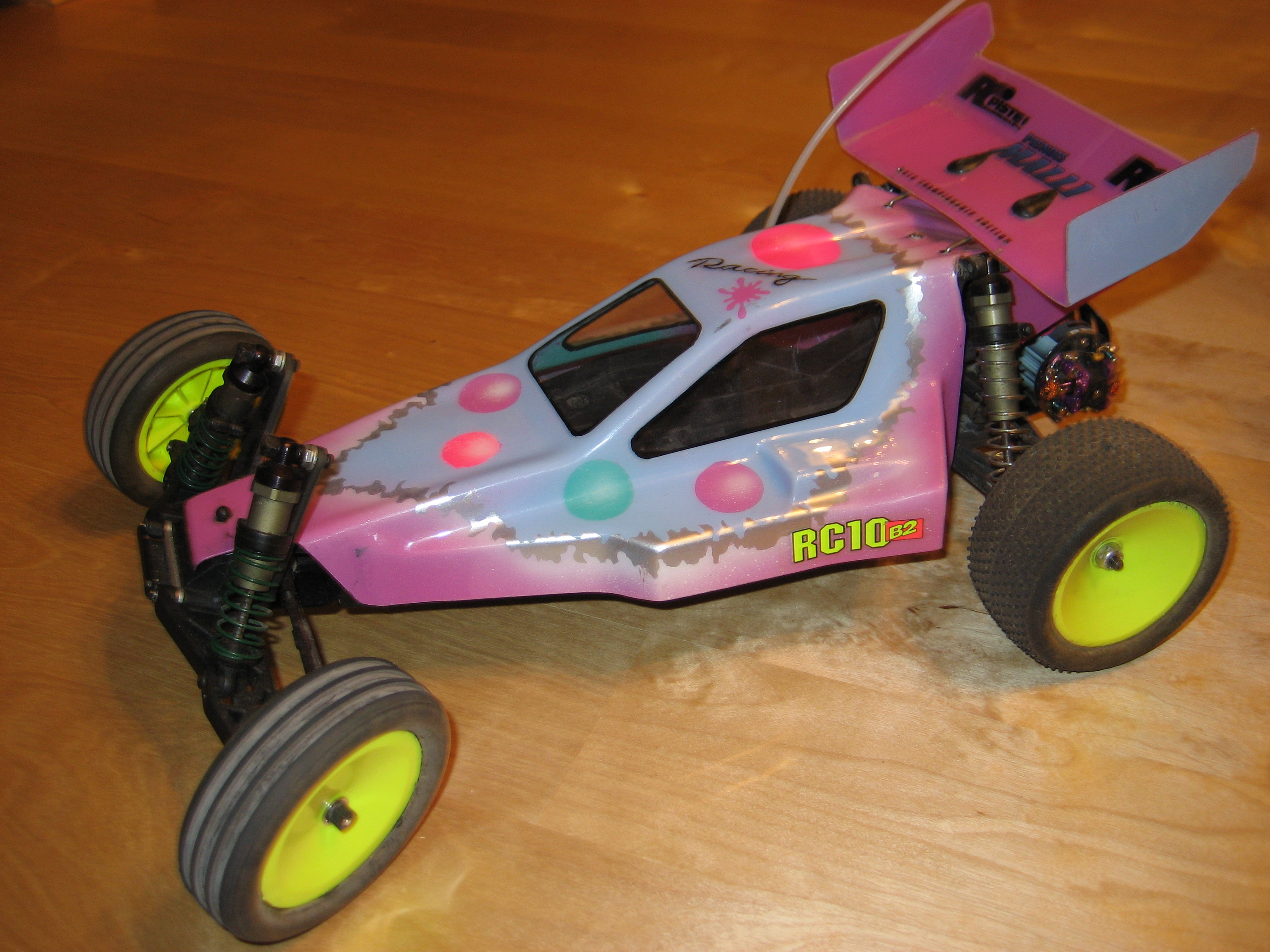
A typical 1990s 2WD buggy design with its long nose, narrow ribbed front tires with wide knobbly rear, rear-mounted electric motor (behind wheel) and spoilers.

=== 1976—1992: Golden era ===
The moment I saw photographs of the cars roaring across the desert, I thought "We've got to do this!" Battery-powered radio-controlled cars were so quiet... you could enjoy playing with them anywhere — in theory, at least. In fact, you were restricted to asphalt and paved surfaces. If we made an off-road battery-powered R/C car then it really could go anywhere.

— Shunsaku Tamiya, on being inspired to create an off-road buggy.

In 1977, after reading an American magazine about an off-road racing convention advertised at the Anaheim Convention Center in California, Shunsaku Tamiya, the president of Tamiya at the time, was inspired after seeing images of buggies racing across deserts. He set out at a trip to the show where he also got to witness the desert races at the Baja California Peninsula. Back in Japan, Tamiya tasked designer Fumito Taki to recreate the off-road racers he witnessed that could be driven anywhere. At a hobby show in Houston, Texas; Shunsaku demonstrated his off-road buggies to a large crowd, who greeted the cars with applause.

Their first buggy, the Rough Rider based on the Funco SSII buggy of Malcolm Smith and Bud Feldkamp, was introduced in 1979, it was notable for being the first "true off-roader", the first car to come with three gear transmission and with independent suspension. It utilized a thin GRP chassis, strengthened by triangular piece of aluminium bolted directly underneath. This was followed shortly by the Sand Scorcher, Taki's more significant designs and their miniature version of the Ford F150 Ranger. The former two was cited by UK's Radio Race Car magazine, in 1990, as the cars that sparked the boom era.

Before that, Kyosho introduced the nitro powered Peanuts 09 in 1976 that was a smaller version of their 1:8 scale buggy, then the electric powered version called the Eleck Peanuts in 1978, that both used a beam axles unlike the independent suspension cars of the Tamiyas and were like its elder 1:8 counterpart, based on beach buggies although off-road cars were regarded by Peter Vieira of Radio Control Car Action (Note: In the December 1999 issue in an article reviewing the history of R/C cars.) as "barely suspended on-road cars with aggressive tires" that "didn't handle at all".

Enthusiasts in Japan took to racing the cars that later spread to other countries. At the time of its release, it was assumed by Lawrence H. Earl, the author of the Usborne Model Guides to Model Cars, that they were intended for drivers who are not interested in racing but however, although it was at its infancy in Europe, dirt racing took off in North America as enthusiasts made temporary tracks to race on and gather together friends to build and organize off-road races however at its infancy, they came to be disparaged by enthusiasts of the nitro-powered 1:8 pan-cars, then at its prime, as toys. The Tamiya led popularity helped the market surge that became known as the Golden Era of Off-Road Racing as it was believed that anybody in the neighborhood had seen a Tamiya Frog or a Hornet at that point the market began to take off in 1984. The Hornet was credited for popularizing the racing scene at a small price with strong after-market support, it was also robust that it can be still be driven after a novice driver drove it head-on into a curb at full speed. This popularity also led Tamiya's Grasshopper to become, reportedly, the best selling radio-controlled car of all time as it had been offered as a quality kit sold at an affordable price to hobbyists with limited budgets.

Bolink was one of the many who responded to Tamiya's successes with the Bigger Digger. Because the Tamiya cars lacked a differential, it utilised ball differential, pioneered by Schumacher, who also acted as a distributor for the UK market. Tamiya responded with a Superchamp that utilized their Free-Floating Progressive Damping System (FFPDS), a suspension system that features rear suspension arms that was connected to a transversely mounted coilover oil filled damper, fed by an oil reservoir. This came to use during the suspension's high-compressions through off-road activities. This was considered to be the early version of the modern shock reservoirs.

In 1982, Kyosho also responded with the Akira Kogawa designed Scorpion, a car dedicated for serious competition use as it was 200/400g lighter to its competitions that went on to become the 1985 ROAR Nationals champion. (Note: Won as a Cox Scorpion as Cox was the US distributor of Kyosho at the time.) The car featured an aluminum ladder frame chassis

The Tamiya Frog, introduced in 1983, was a departure from all other cars at the time as it was not based on a real car. Based on their miniature version of the Subaru BRAT; it was unique for utilizing a chassis made of a resin compound of acrylonitrile butadiene styrene (ABS) and fully independent suspension that features rear trailering arms paired with coil-over oil-filled shocks and inboard spring type independent front suspension. Although it shared side plates and nylon mouldings as the BRAT, the entire internals was entirely new. It featured a redesigned ballraced diffentials that enabled racers a choice of three gear ratios and a lightweight Polycarbonate body that became commonly used on all buggies. Also, it was notable for that it appealed to beginners as well as racers who proceeded to modify the car heavily in order to make it competitive. It won the inaugural Deutsche Meisterschaften Elektro Off-road 1:10, the German championship, in 1984, driven by Michael Kleinhaus.

In the periods between 1983 and 1984, three brands claimed to be the first to introduce 4WD buggies to the market on each front; Hirobo introduced the 44b, the first 4WD buggy; Yokomo, the YZ-834B "Dog Fighter", the first race specific 4WD buggy and Kyosho the Progress respectively; the first to be sold with four-wheel steering. Another car introduced by Kyosho in 1985, the Optima also by Kogawa, was the first 4WD car to offer double wishbone A-arms for both ends of the car with its own oil-filled coilover shock absorber on each corner of the car. The Dog Fighter used a Kydex flat pan chassis, monoshocks on all corners, limited-slip differential and chain drive. It became successful that, driven by with Gil Losi Jr., it won the inaugural IFMAR Off-Road Worlds.

At the time when competitions was offered to stock and modified motors (Note: A stock class motor is intended for the goals of limited power and cost restricted therefore equal competition; at its time, a ROAR stock motors has armature as opposed to ball bearings, however it is 10-20% slower than modified.) and 4WD buggies was at its infancy, many clubs allowed them to race against drivers with 2WD cars, therefore drivers resorted to buying these instead, usually defeating them in the process.

Team Associated took the realm of the race buggy further when they introduced the Roger Curtis designed RC10, a car that established the layout (motors and batteries on a flat tub chassis) that became an industry standard for all off-road buggies by industry insiders. Taking inspiration from real off-road buggies, Curtis looked at how the suspension could be designed to cope with the high demands of off-road racing. The chassis was made from anodized, aircraft grade aluminum alloy, it also featured machined, oil-filled aluminium shock absorbers that can be adjusted with high-impact nylon suspension control arms, ball differentials and two-piece wheels. It primarily proved that designs based on its real life counterpart was not the way to win races, as a result, manufacturers began to break away from realism. Before this, cars sold had to be heavily modified from its stock format in order to be competitive.

In 1986, Schumacher introduced its first 1:10 off-road model, the CAT (Competition All Terrain); it featured innovations not seen before in R/C cars; universal joint, belt drive transmission system and a 'crash back' front suspension mount (designed to protect the front suspensions in a front-on collisions). It was cited by Radio Race Car magazine, in 1990, to be one of the greatest cars of all. Its success was marked the following year with a win at the EFRA Euros, ROAR Nationals and the IFMAR Worlds.

PB Racing, another British manufacturer, attempted to emulate the success of Schumacher and other brands with their Mini Mustang, also a belt drive car with twin differentials. It was available in 2WD, 4WD and 2-speed 4WD. The 2-speed option appealed to racers but was proved to be problematic, so racers resorted to the single speed version. It initially enjoyed success in racing before it rapidly lost popularity for undisclosed reasons.

Traditionally found in on-road cars, the 1980s saw the use of large rear spoilers on cars such as the RC10 and Team Losi JRX-2 in 1988. At that point, buggies began to break away from realism.

Losi Jr. had used his racing experience to develop the JRX-2 into a winner. The car featured carbon fiber flat pan chassis, low rotating mass 48dp gearbox, fully independent suspension and five-link rear trailing arm suspension which made the car popular with racers.

Enthusiasts began to experiment with custom built front-wheel drive cars and then manufacturers joined the fray, leading to a short surge of popularity as they claimed it was easier on slick surfaces and cheaper to manufacture. Nichimo was the first to introduce FWD to production off-road buggies when they introduced the Spirit FF. in 1986. As they held great advantage over RWD cars on loose, bumpy dirt tracks, one of the main disadvantage of this drivetrain was that they have problems with traction in sandier surfaces in addition to in some championships such as the ROAR Nationals, they are forced to compete against the 4WD car and was banned by IFMAR for its advantages hence why the class never caught on.

The Kyosho Optima Mid was the first car to utilize a mid-mounted motor in 1987, it was amongst the few brands to experiment with this type of drivetrain. The car enjoyed successes with club racers.

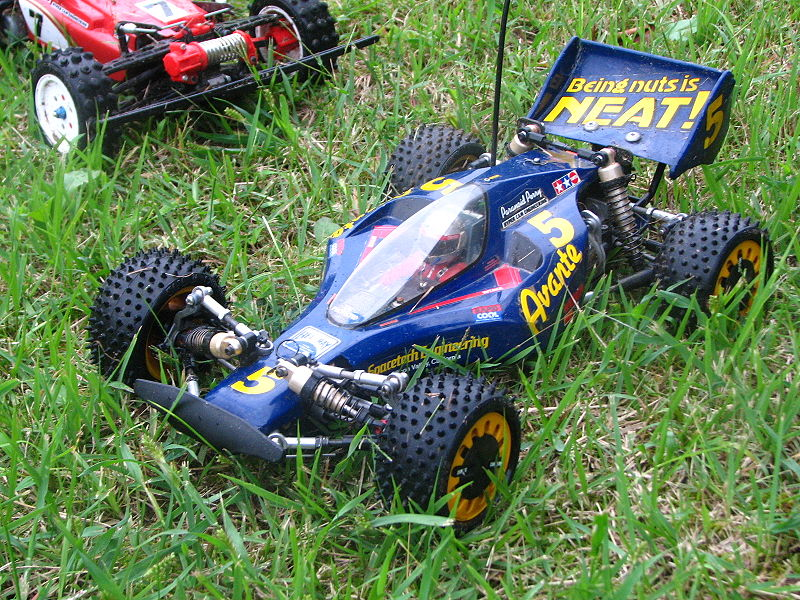
Tamiya Avante

As their Frog and Hotshots became obsolete over the years and Tamiya was in desperate need to create a serious competition car against the Yokomos and Kyoshos, they evolved the competition buggy formula further when they introduced the Taki designed Avante in 1988. The car was revolutionary as it featured a number of aluminum and fibre-reinforced plastic parts with a contrast to the plastics its competitors were offering, with its stiffness and near-infinite adjustability. It was the first car to have its mid-motor mounted parallel to the centre drive shaft Designed to compete in its only race it was designed to do the 1988 JMRCA All-Japan Off-Road 4WD Championship where it finished 7th by Yoshiaki Sugiyama, this meant it became unsuited to other tracks as the aluminum parts were too soft and broke regularly, the front suspension bottomed out with alarming regularity and the handling was below par to other cars.

As 1987 being regarded as its peak year, many manufacturers who specialized in toys like Nikko and Yonezawa joined in the market with ready to run (RTR) and inexpensively made cars marketed as toys. Another large toy manufacturer, Tomy in contrast made a short-lived attempt to break into the competitive hobbyist market by creating its own "special hobby division"; its result was the Intruder.

Yokomo introduced the YZ-870C "Super Dog Fighter" (known in the US as the C4). The car was designed to be easily worked on such as the drive belt which can be removed in minutes, as opposed to half-an-hour on competitor's cars. It enjoyed successes on the racetracks, notably the 1989 IFMAR 4WD Worlds.

2WD cars had begun to regain popularity by 1989 with manufacturers bringing a car of its own such as Tamiya's Astute and Schumacher's Top Cat.

=== 1990s—2000s: Decline ===
By the end of the 1980s, the buggy class single-handedly turned the radio-controlled car market into a multimillion-dollar business but in 1990, Tamiya, a market leader in off-road cars; shifted their attention toward on-road cars when in 1991, they adapted their Manta Ray's DF-01 chassis to a Nissan Skyline GT-R NISMO bodyshell. The chassis, renamed as TA-01, had short suspension arms and realistic narrower wheels to maintain a realistic appearance they were aiming for. They thus invented the touring car class. (Note: Regardless that it was the second model to use the TA-01 chassis after the Toyota Celica GT-Four, a WRC car.) In North America and Japan, the off-road buggies faced stiff competition against the touring cars as its increasing popularity in the 1990s led to an increase of meetings taking place on parking lots. Also, the 1990s saw an emergence of the stadium trucks that shared the same platform and suspension components as the buggies. They were popular to such extent that by the early 2000s, they (both nitro and electric) overtook buggies in terms of popularity despite being offered mainly in 2WDs.

An article in the July 1990 issue of RCCA by Steve Pond claimed whilst expensive to the entry-level market, the 1:8 off-road buggies, then primarily popular in Europe and Japan; viewed at the time by enthusiasts as expensive and problematic to operate and maintain, was less expensive to a 1:10 buggy for the top end racer; costing at US$1,359 (equivalent to $3,349 in 2025) to US$1,965 (equivalent to $4,842 in 2025) for a complete kit including radio and power source. Kyosho, who was best known for their 1:10 off-road cars, at then led a marketing initiate to promote the class with the Yuichi Kanai (Kogawa's successor in the 1:8 off-road project) designed Turbo Burns. Throughout the decade, Kyosho became the class leader with Kanai's Inferno series taking its record six consecutive IFMAR wins. In the April 1993 issue of RCCA, the magazine received numerous mails from enthusiasts all over the world on how they became converted to the class with many hobby brands swiftly cashing in on its newfound popularity. It was claimed in its April 1994 issue that "every major R/C manufacturer now has a gas-powered R/C vehicle in their lineup".

At the time of the competing class' rising popularity, the buggy market had begun to reach saturation point as many companies continued to enter into the market with the emphasis on recreation driving (Note: Known as bashing.) to competitive racing with a number of tracks closed down throughout North America and the last Reedy International Race of Champions took place in 2000.

Like every other physical hobbies, the increasing popularity in video games was seen as one of the main cause, as well that the market was flooded with unremarkable designs in contrast to the innovations of the 1980s as the market became emphasized on streamlined cars to feed the market for racers.

Aside the number of toy manufacturers who tried to cash in on the boom years, many companies abandoned the market such as Marui and Hirobo, closed down (Aoyagi) or if they didn't, they later experienced buyouts such as Team Losi, who had been by 1999, being half-owned by Team Trinity's Ernest Provetti; was sold to Horizon Hobby in 2001 and Team Associated to its Taiwanese manufacturing partner, Thunder Tiger in 2005. Despite its ownership, Team Losi had enjoyed one of its most dominant eras. that spanned from the 1980s.

Although drivers experimented with the use of front spoilers, the 1990s saw manufacturer bringing them into production, when Tenth Technology introduced the Predator in early 1994 that was sold with them followed by the Team Losi XXX with its optional High Downforce Wing Kit. Later in the decade saw a migration of indoor venues and high-grip clay tracks which saw an emphasis on aerodynamics which was expected to benefit front spoilers but they were slow to catch on until recently (as in 2015) for 2WD buggies.

=== 2000s—date: Resurgence ===
The 1990s saw a culture of collecting vintage Tamiya models as many of them commanded high sums of money, many of these were off-road buggies, the Sand Scorcher and Avante included. To feed to those nostalgic popularity, Tamiya resorted to reissuing their past models joined by many other brands including Kyosho and Team Associated who reissued their past cars such as the Scorpion and RC10.

When Traxxas launched the Slash in 2008, a Short Course Truck realistically designed to resemble a real pick-up truck intending as a novelty car, it was credited for turning the R/C car market around and led to manufacturers introduced its own race versions.

The traditional dirt tracks have given way to first blue groove surfaces (Note: Hard-packed, high-bite, abrasive surface that is made of compacted clay or sometimes requires them to be chemically treated.) and then seen the emergence of carpet and artificial turf tracks, mainly from Europe and Asia, as the latter two are considered easy to set up and easier to maintain and thus became a choice surface over dirt, with manufacturers producing parts and cars designed for racing on this type of high-grip surface.

Brushless motors, and 6 V nickel–cadmium (Ni-Cd) and the lithium iron phosphate (LiFePO_{4}) of the early 1980s up until the early 2000s being replaced by nickel–metal hydride (NiMH) and then the 2 Cell (7.4 volt) lipo batteries, the latter became the norm for racing helped to bring the class back to prominence in addition to new car releases.

== Characteristics ==
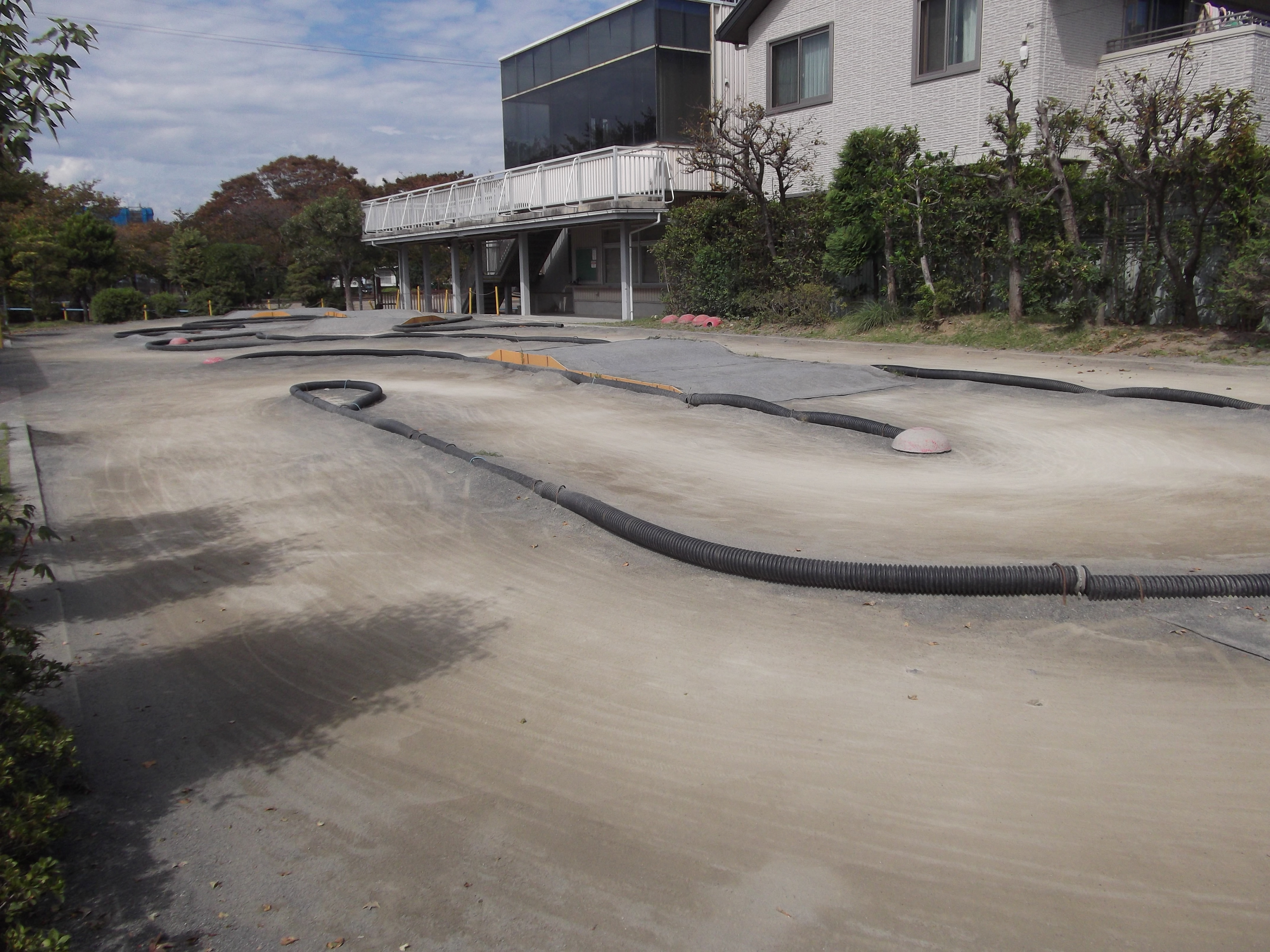
A typical 1:10 specific off-road dirt track noticeably by its small size and lack of pit lane (for nitro cars)

The cars are designed for running on dirt and more recently, carpets and artificial turfs; both featuring jumps. The buggies feature independent suspension, long-travel shock absorbers, and covered transmission and radio compartment to keep them running in extreme conditions. For a 2WD buggy, the rear tires are spiked for traction, while the front tires are thin, and ribbed for good steering in dirt. On a 4WD buggy, all four tires are identical, spiked tires. They are designed specifically for dirt, and running on pavement wears the spikes down quickly.

The 2WD class is usually regarded as a beginner class as they carry fewer parts and are inexpensive to buy and run but are slower in comparison to the 4WD class which is stabler but are more direct and aggressive, regardless of its disadvantages, they are popular with drivers of all levels.

In major championships, races are run to a single 5 minute round with the exception of the championship races, known as the A-main, that is run to three rounds with the two best results that counts.

The class overall is popular with newcomers that much of the international drivers began their hobbies racing them.

Despite not being based on any real full-sized cars, the regulation require them to "resemble" a full-sized car found in off-road racing, according to ROAR regulations, they cannot resemble a pickup truck as truck-type vehicles run in separate classes. British Radio Car Association (BRCA) regulations states they have to resemble cars from either rallycross, rallying, trail and desert racing but not those from Formula One or sports car racing.

Cars are required to run on a maximum of 7.4 V 2S LiPo batteries and tires provided by company chosen to provide tires in the races. 2WD and 4WD cars cannot weigh less than 1,474 and 1,588 grams respectively. (Note: Respective of 2WD and 4WD classes: 1474g and 1588g in IFMAR and EFRA, 1499g and 1613g in ROAR, 1480g and 1590 in Euro Offroad Series.)

== See also ==
- IFMAR 1:10 Electric Off-Road World Championship
