= IFMAR 1:5 Large Scale World Championship =

International radio-controlled car racing championship

The IFMAR World Championship for 1:5 IC Track Cars (officially the IFMAR 1:5 IC Track World Championship), commonly known as the IC Large Scale Worlds, is an international radio-controlled car racing competition sanctioned by the International Federation of Model Auto Racing (IFMAR). The championship has been held biennially in odd numbered years since 2001.

The event is uses 1:5 scale on-road car with touring car style bodies powered by internal combustion (IC) engines running on a nitromethanol fuel mixture.

== Venues ==
Edition			Venue				Competitors			Ref.
No.	Date	Year	Circuit	Location	Country	Bloc	No.	Nations	Bloc	Ref.
N/A	24-26 Nov	2000		Stuttgart	Germany	EFRA	57	14	3	
1	11-19 Aug	2001	Minidrom Ettlingen	Ettlingen	Germany	EFRA	136	22	6	
2	27Sep -4Oct	2003	KZ Speedway	Sun Valley, Los Angeles, California	United States	ROAR				
3	18-28 Aug	2005	Mini Racing Ticino e Moesa	Lostallo	Switzerland	EFRA				
4	20-30 Sept.	2007	England Park Raceway	Brisbane	Australia	FEMCA				
5		2009	Tshwane Raceway And Promotions (TRAP)	Pretoria	South Africa	FAMAR				
6	23-27	2011	Complexe d'Hanvec (AMCO)	Brest	France	EFRA	94	18	4	
7	3-11 Aug	2013	Mini Racing Ticino e Moesa	Lostallo	Switzerland	EFRA	143	22	3	
8	4-12 Sept.	2015	KLIRCC Kepong	Kuala Lumpur	Malaysia	FEMCA				
9	25Nov - 2Dec	2017	Enzo Bransiforte	Buenos Aires	Argentina	FAMAR	37	6	3	
10		2019	Associação de Modelismo de Vila Real	Vila Real	Portugal	EFRA	84	19	5	
11	11-18 Sept.	2022	Steel City RC Raceway	Fontana	United States		55	14	4	
12	20-27 Oct	2024	The John Grant International Raceway	Sydney	Australia		N/A	N/A	N/A	
13	27 Jul -1Aug	2026	MRTM Lostallo	Lostallo	Switzerland	EFRA	46	13	1	

== World Champions Driver and Manufacturers ==
Some parts of the car are supplied by the event origanisers. These are typically the fuel to reduce shipping and rule compliance issues and the tyres to make the competition more equal. These parts are marked in italics.

Year	Driver	Chassis		Bodyshell		Engine			Electronics				Tyres		Ref.
Year	Driver	Brand	Model	Brand	Model	Brand	Model	Fuel	Transmitter	Model	Servo	Model	Brand	Type	Ref.
2000	Markus Feldmann (GER)	Lauterbacher													
2001	Marcel Strauch (GER)	FG Competition													
2003	Hessel Roskam (NED)	FG Competition													
2005	Ian Oddie (GBR)	H.A.R.M.													
2007	Martin Lissau (DEN)	FG Competition													
2009	Barend Myburgh (RSA)	H.A.R.M.													
2011	Guillaume Solon (FRA)	Contrast													
2013	Jeffrey Van Wijk (NED)	RS5													
2015	Russell Grenenger (AUS)	H.A.R.M.													
2017	Santiago Meirinhos (ARG)	RSS													
2019	Marko Grigic (CRO)	Mecatech													
2021	COVID														
2022	Markus Feldmann (GER)														
2024	CANCELLED LACK OF ENTRIES														
2026	Arthur Simon (FRA)														

== See also ==
- IFMAR World Championships
- IFMAR 1:10 ISTC Electric World Championship
- IFMAR 1:8 IC Track World Championship
