= Nikko R/C =

Radio controlled toy manufacturer

Nikko Radio Control
- Company type: Private
- Industry: R/C Cars
- Founded: 1958
- Headquarters: Hong Kong
- Area served: Worldwide
- Key people: Philip Redmond (CEO), John Arndt (Head of Design), Laibond Cheng (President of Sales & Marketing)
- Website: www.nikkotoys.com

Nikko R/C (styled NIKKO R/C) is the largest toy-grade radio control manufacturer in the world. The company's licenses include those from Dodge, Ford, Volkswagen, Chevrolet, Porsche, as well as proprietary designs. In 2014, Nikko was acquired by global toy company, Toy State. In 2017, Toy State created a new arm of the Nikko brand, Nikko Air. In 2019, Nikko Toys Ltd. became the new home of the Nikko RC brand.

== History ==
In 1958, Nikko R/C was founded by Takeshi Hattori in Japan. Nikko launched their radio-controlled vehicle line in 1966 and started producing their full manufacturing line in 1973.

In 1977, Nikko expanded operations overseas, opening manufacturing plants in the United States, Canada, Europe, Asia, Africa, Australia, South America, and New Zealand. The Nikko R/C line contained an expansive number of vehicles that ranged from buggies, speed cars and off-road vehicles to boats, special action vehicles, and air flight.

An early Nikko design was the F10 series frame buggy, a 1:10 scale two-wheel-drive dune buggy and sold both by Nikko and RadioShack. There were many versions of the Nikko F10.

It also served as the basis for the Traxxas Cat. Refined with hobby-grade electronics including an electronic speed control and a revised front end with a wider track, the Cat became Traxxas' - and the industry's - first ready-to-run hobby-grade model.

In 2014, global toy company, Toy State, secured the worldwide rights to Nikko by acquiring the consolidated operations of its Japan and Hong Kong offices. Toy State also acquired Nikko Entertainment BV, the European arm of Nikko.

Since Toy State's acquisition, it has added many R/C items to the Nikko line-up, such as VaporizR, Velocitrax, and Barracuda X.

In 2017, Toy State created a new arm of the Nikko brand, Nikko Air. The company manufactures racing drones in partnership with the Drone Racing League (DRL).

In Fall 2017, Toy State released the first Nikko Air products; Nikko Air Race Vision 220 FPV Pro, Nikko Air Elite 115 and the Nikko Air Elite 115 Race Set.

In January 2019, Nikko Toys Ltd. became the new home of the Nikko RC brand after Toy State International stopped trading in September 2018. Nikko Toys Ltd. design and manufacture toys for the famous Road Rippers and Machine Maker brands as well as the Nikko RC brand.

== Nikko America ==
The US distribution arm for Nikko toys and models and, as of 2006, is that country's sole distributor for Erector Sets, the longest-running brand in the US toy business. Ownership of Erector remains with British manufacturer Meccano.

A subdivision of Nikko is Nikko TEC, which can be described as a special vehicles division. Currently the only TEC division product being sold is the ProClass series of cars. The series consists of F1 cars, upgradeable 1/14 scale cars, and 1/10 cars that are almost hobby quality. Older TEC division vehicles included:

- Thor-type trucks: Large 1/10 4wd trucks powered by 7.2v batteries and twin 380 motors, with working headlights. Most had Toyota Hilux-based bodies.
- Hilux/Unimog Winch: A wide series of 1/10-1/16 vehicles with working winches, detailed bodies, and 4WD, various features on different models such as working headlights, 2wd/4wd switch, two gears, horn, and even some of the above functions operated by the transmitter.
- F10 series Frame Buggies: Mentioned above, arguably the most used design ever in R/C. 7.2v/540, digital proportional.
