= Stadium truck =

Traxxas Jato 3.3 nitro powered stadium truck

A stadium truck is a small, off-road radio-controlled car, either rear wheel drive (example: Traxxas Rustler) or four wheel drive (example: Arrma Vorteks 4x4). Stadium trucks are distinct from other types of off-road R/C vehicles, such as buggies and short course trucks, by their combination of truck-style bodies and open-wheeled layout.

== Construction ==
The construction of most manufacturers' stadium trucks, are similar to those of buggies. Most feature wheels and tires that are both larger in diameter and wider for increased ground clearance and improved handling and stability. The chassis of most electric powered models is constructed of plastic or a fiber/plastic composite while internal combustion powered models typically have chassis made of aluminum.

Their appearance loosely resembles that of full scale trophy trucks and short-course trucks. The primary difference is that the tires and suspension components extend far outboard of the body, similar to open wheel cars. Short course trucks, a similar type of R/C car, much more closely resemble full-size trophy trucks.

Although stadium trucks have no direct full-size counterpart, their name refers to types of full-size R/C vehicles that are raced on a closed circuit or stadium rather than a long, outdoor road course. The R/C vehicles themselves are also often raced in an indoor, stadium-like setting.

== See also ==
- Inrunner
- ZipZaps
