= Yunnan Copper =

Chinese copper producing company

Yunnan Copper Company Limited 雲南銅業股份有限公司
- Type: State-owned enterprise
- Industry: Copper products manufacturing
- Founded: 1958
- Headquarters: Kunming, Yunnan, People's Republic of China
- Area served: People's Republic of China
- Key people: Chairman: Mr. Liu Mingcai
- Revenue: US$19.8 billion (2023)
- Net income: US$279.1 million (2023)
- Number of employees: 9,041
- Parent: Yunnan Copper Group
- Website: Yunnan Copper Company Limited

Yunnan Copper Company Limited (SZSE: 000878, formerly Yunnan Smelting Plant) is the third largest copper producer in China. It was established in 1958 in Kunming, Yunnan.

Its products include copper cathode, sulfuric acid, copper rod, bare copper wire, gold, silver, platinum, palladium, selenium, tellurium, bismuth, copper sulfate and nickel sulfate.

In November 2007, Aluminum Corporation of China Limited acquired 49% of total shares of Yunnan Copper Group, Yunnan Copper Company's parent company.

As of 2017, Yunnan Copper Die Casting, a joint venture between the company and Nanyang Explosion Protection Group Co., is a known electric motor manufacturer. They specialized in remanufacturing of electric motors by replacing aluminum rotors with copper rotors.

== Electric motor manufacturing ==
In 2006, Yunnan Copper Co. Ltd. and Nanyang Explosion Protection Group Co. Ltd. established the joint venture Yunnan Copper Die Casting Co. Ltd. to commercialized copper rotor motors.

The International Copper Association, in collaboration with Yunnan Copper Die Casting, launched a program in 2013 to remanufacture old electric motors by replacing their aluminum rotors with cast copper rotors. This process significantly improves motor efficiency, allowing older models to meet modern energy efficiency standards.

== See also ==
- Electric motor manufacturing industry in China
