= Hirobo =

Hirobo Electric Corporation (ヒロボー株式会社, Hirobō kabushiki-gaisha) is a Japanese RC model company best known for their line of high-quality radio controlled helicopter models, both glow fuel powered (also referred to as nitro powered) and more recently, electric powered. Its parent company is Hirobo Limited.

The company was founded October, 1949 as textile machine manufacturer Hiroshima Spinner, Limited. In 1957, the company partnered with Nichibo Company to form Hiroshima Synthetic Fiber Spinners Limited, today known as Unitika Limited. The name change to Hirobo Limited came about in 1970; the electronics division was established in April, 1973. Production of radio controlled models began in July that same year. By October, 1977, the company had completely withdrawn from the textile market.

In 1983, Hirobo attempted to put their expertise in helicopters to use in the production of 1/10-scale, four-wheel-drive offroad buggies. Beginning with their innovative 44b off-road car, which was the first to feature a four wheel drive system. The results were the technologically advanced Alien Mid4, Jealousy and Invader, and not forgetting the Ashura, the only belt-drive 4wd 1/12 circuit car ever produced. All featured a 4x4 system operated via a Gilmer belt, an innovation nearly unheard of at the time; most 4x4 cars of the period used a noisy, power-robbing metal chain to transfer power to the front wheels. Despite their advances, Hirobo cars were very expensive and therefore limited their exposure to racers. They were also often plagued with poor build qualities and the use of cheap materials, the other factor of their failing are, distribution in the important North American market was weak as well, all that leading to Hirobo's withdrawal from the RC car market.

Hirobo continues to be a leader in helicopters of all price ranges, including coaxial-bladed indoor Sky Robo helicopters in both radio controlled and tethered configurations.
