= Tamiya Rough Rider =

Tamiya Rough Rider was the very first of Tamiya's SRB (Special racing buggies) series. These according to Tamiya made Radio Control Models accessible to everyone. The design is famous for its fibre glass chassis with rear torsion bars and front hairpin springs. These models originally cost 18,000 yen. They are very popular these days to collectors being first in the series that produced legends like the Sand Scorcher and the Super Champ. These days, MIB (Mint in Box) examples of this model are very rare and change hands for a lot of money. Even what can only be described as wrecks change hands for good money.

== Specifications ==
- Original Tamiya catalog number:58015
- Released:1-NOV-79
- Drive:Rear 2wd
- Suspension:Swingarms rear w/torsion bars, trailing arms front with hairpin springs, oil filled metal dampers
- Chassis desc.:fibre glass plate, waterresistant radio box
- Body:Hard white plastic
- Motor:MabuchiRS-540S
- Original price:18000 Yen
- Width:210 mm
- Length:400 mm
- Height:150 mm
- Wheelbase:250 mm
- Weight:2,100 grams
- Scale:1/10
- Front tire:Semi pneumatic rubber tire
- Rear tire:Semi pneumatic rubber tire

== External links and Reference ==
- Tamiyaclub.com
