= Electric motor manufacturing industry in China =

China's electric motor industry has been developed for 60 years. Most manufacturers produce low power and small-size motors. Small motor manufacturers are mostly located in Zhejiang province, Fujian province, and Guangdong province. Only a few motor manufacturers produces high power and large-size motors, for example Wannan Motor and Sogears Motor.

High power and large-size motors are often used in rolling mills, etc. In the last, ABB and Siemens large-size motors took a large market shares in China. However, ABB and Simens motor often have very high sale prices so that some rolling mills cannot afford. They need domestic large-size motors instead of ABB motors. Currently, those rolling mills can buy from domestic motor manufacturers which can produce such large-size motors.

== Government policies ==
In 2010, the Ministry of Industry and Information Technology issued its "Interim Measures for Accreditation and Management of Remanufactured Product" to standardize the electric motor industry and guide remanufacturing activities. This was followed by "Guidelines for Implementation of Accreditation of Remanufactured Product" to further clarify accreditation requirements. In 2012, the ministry and the General Administration of Quality Supervision, Inspection and Quarantine launched a "Plan for Improvement of Energy Efficiency of Electric Motor" to promote energy conservation and encourage the development of high-efficiency electric motors.

== Notable companies ==
Yunnan Copper Die Casting Co., Ltd., Hebei Electric Motor Co., Ltd., Nanyang Explosion Protection Group Co., Ltd. are some of the notable electric motor manufacturing companies in China.

== See also ==
- Economy of China
