= Traxxas =

American hobby R/C manufacturer

- Type: Private
- Industry: Hobby R/C manufacturing
- Founded: 1986
- Founder: Jim Jenkins
- Key people: Mike Jenkins (Owner)
- Products: R/C cars, trucks, boats, quadcopters
- Revenue: US$25–50 million (estimated, annually)
- Website: www.traxxas.com

Traxxas is a radio control model manufacturer based in McKinney, Texas, United States. Traxxas offers electric and nitro-powered radio-controlled cars, off-road and on-road vehicles, boats, and a drone.

Traxxas offers a wide variety of land radio-controlled vehicles, from short course trucks to crawlers to monster trucks and more. They have on-road and off-road cars.

They offer vehicles for beginners and experienced RC drivers. Most of the vehicles don’t include batteries and/or chargers.

These RC vehicles reach speeds from 30–100 mph.

== Radio-controlled Monster Trucks ==
Traxxas RC monster trucks:

- Xmaxx
- Maxx
- Xmaxx ultimate
- Xrt
- Xrt ultimate
- Mini Xrt
- Sledge Belted
- Revo 3.3
- T-maxx 3.3
- T-maxx Classic
- Stampede VXL
- Stampede BL-2s
- Bigfoot 4x4 BL-2s
- Bigfoot 2WD BL-2s
- Mini Maxx
- 1/16 E-revo VXL
- 1/16 Summit
- Stampede 2WD BL-2s
- Stampede 2WD XL-5
- 1/16 E-revo
- LaTrax 1/18 teton
- TRX-4MT F-150

== On-road and rally cars ==
- XO-1 Supercar (on-road, fastest car 100+ mph)
- Drag Slash C10 (on-road)
- Drag Slash Mustang (on-road)
- Ford Fiesta ST VXL (rally)
- 4-TEC Drift (on-road)
- Ford Fiesta ST BL-2s (Rally)
- 4-TEC 2.0 VXL (On-road)
- 4-TEC 2.0 BL-2s (On-road)
- LaTrax 1/18 Rally

== Stadium trucks and buggies ==
- Xrt
- Xrt Ultimate
- Sledge Belted
- Jato 4x4 VXL
- Jato 3.3
- Rustler 4x4 Ultimate
- Rustler 4x4 VXL
- Jato 4x4 BL-2s
- Nitro Rustler
- Rustler 4x4 BL-2s
- 1/16 E-revo VXL
- Rustler 2WD BL-2s
- Rustler 2WD XL-5
- 1/16 E-revo
- Bandit XL-5

== Short-course trucks ==
- Maxx Slash
- Unlimited Desert Racer
- Slash 4x4 Ultimate
- Raptor R 4x4
- Slayer Pro 4x4
- Slash Modified (Mudboss)
- Slash 4x4 VXL
- Slash 2WD VXL
- Nitro Slash 2WD
- Slash 4x4 BL-2s
- Raptor 2WD BL-2s (recently discountinued)
- Slash 2WD BL-2s
- Slash 2WD BL-2s kit
- Slash 2WD XL-5
- LaTrax Prerunner
- 1/16 Slash 4x4

== History ==
Starting in 1986, Traxxas began selling a series of electric powered stadium truck and buggy models. In 1989, Traxxas released its first radio-controlled boat, the Villan IV. In 1992, its first RTR nitro model, the Nitro Hawk, was released, followed by an RTR nitro boat, the Nitro Vee, four years later. This boat was the world's first Nitro-powered boat, with a second electric motor in case the engine died.

In 1999, Traxxas released its first full-sized monster truck model, the T-Maxx. A larger monster truck; the X-Maxx, came out in 2015. Traxxas also debuted a self-righting system where a flipped vehicle can adjust itself back into place.

In November 2012, Traxxas launched its first aircraft product, the ready-to-fly DR-1 Helicopter and QR-1 Quadcopter.

As of March 2026, Traxxas offers a large variety of different kinds of radio-controlled cars, which can be classified into the following types and their respective models:

- Buggies: Bandit (all variations of this model are available in 2WD brushed only)
- Monster trucks: Stampede, BIGFOOT No1 (available in bl-2s 2WD and 4x4)., Hoss (discontinued), Maxx, Revo 3.3, E-Revo 1.0 and 2.0(discontinued), 1/16 E-Revo, 1/16 Summit, T-Maxx Classic, T-Maxx 3.3, Sledge, and X-Maxx (Stampede is available in 2WD and 4WD, and all other models are only available in 4WD. X-Maxx is available with Belted tires, and an Ultimate edition. The XRT is available with an Ultimate edition as well.)
- Short-course and desert trucks: Slash, Slash BL-2s, F-150 Raptor (recently discountinued) Slayer pro, 1/16 Slash, Maxx Slash, Unlimited Desert Racer, and Ford Raptor R (while the Slash is available in 2WD and 4WD, the no-longer continued F-150 Raptor is in 2WD only. It's very similar to a Slash 2wd BL-2s with a few modifications like front bumper and body options. And Slayer pro, 1/16 Slash, Maxx Slash, and the Unlimited Desert Racer are only available in 4WD. Slash 4x4 has an ultimate edition.)
- Stadium trucks: Rustler, Rustler vxl, Rustler Vxl 4wd, Rustler BL-2s, Rustler BL-2s 4wd, Nitro Rustler, Jato 3.3 (Nitro Rustler and Jato 3.3 are 2wd only Rustler is 2wd and 4wd.),
- Trail trucks and Crawlers: TRX-4, TRX-4 High Trail edition, TRX-4 Sport, TRX-4 Traxx TRX-4M, TRX-4M High Trail Edition, recently discountinued TRX4MT, and TRX-6 (all 4WD or 6WD, depending on number of wheels on the particular model. TRX-6 comes with a hauler body and winch or a BMW SUV body available in gray and black)
- On-road cars: 4-tec 2.0, 4-tec 3.0, XO-1, Drag Slash, Ford Fiesta ST, Toyota GR Supra GT4 (Drag Slash is 2WD, rest are all 4WD)
- Flight: Alias (quadcopter drone)
- Boats: Spartan, Disruptor, M41, Blast (Blast has a NiMH compatible 21T motor vs the spartan and M41 having 6s brushless, Spartan has two versions: the Race boat, and the SR, Disruptor has a 4s VXL and Velineon.)

=== Traxxas firsts ===
- First fuel-burning ready-to-run RC
- FIRST Ready-to-Run RC
- FIRST Driver-actuated Forward/Reverse Transmission
- FIRST Remote-operated Locking Differentials
- FIRST High/Low transmission
- FIRST auto-shifting two-speed transmission
- FIRST waterproof electronics
- FIRST 2.4 GHz transmitter with Apple iOS interface
- FIRST (and only true)100 mph RTR vehicle
- First self-righting monster trucks
- First fuel powered marine vehicle

== Traxxas Racing ==
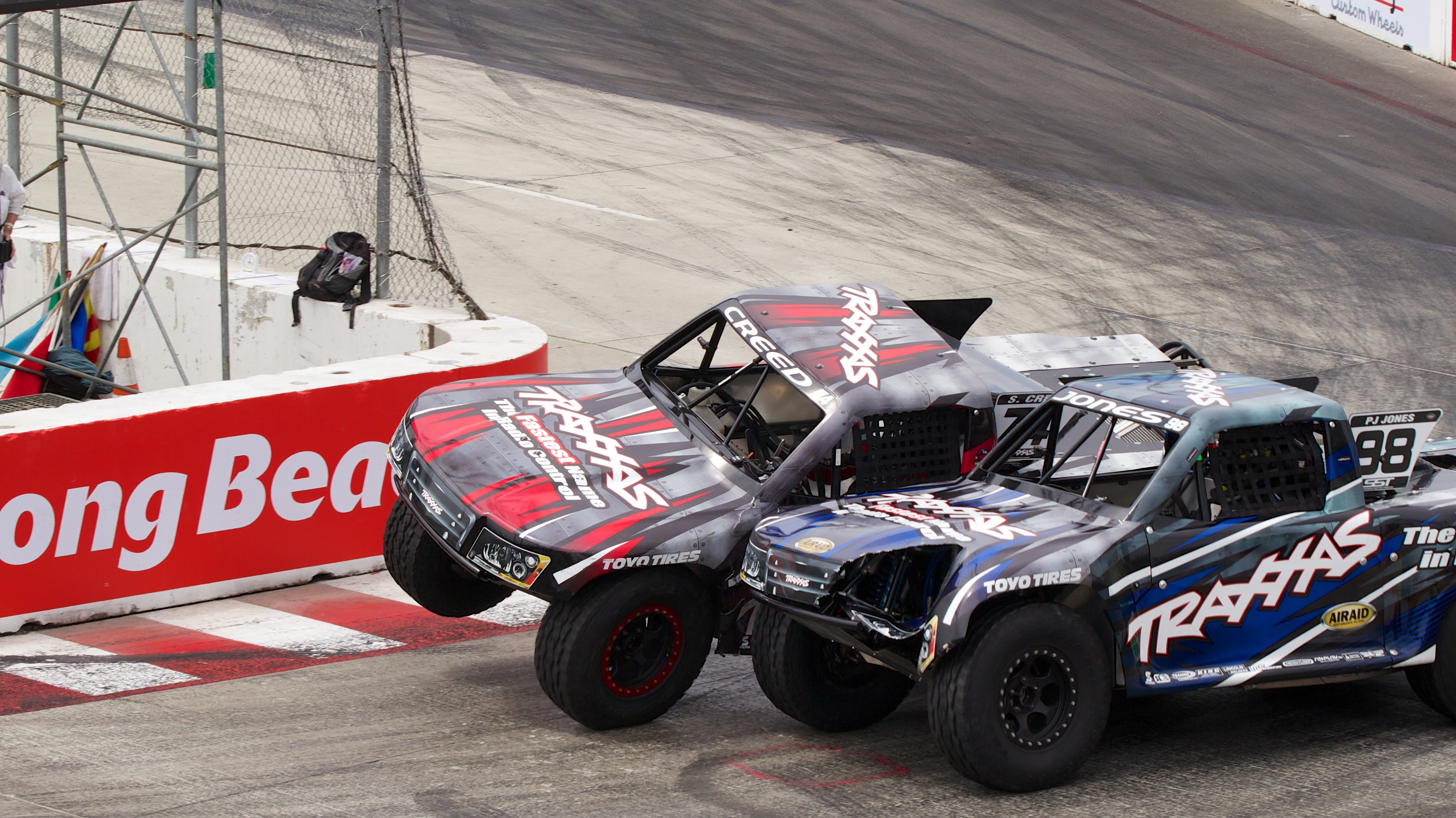
Team Traxxas drivers Sheldon Creed and P. J. Jones competing in the Stadium Super Trucks race at Long Beach in 2014

- Traxxas was a title sponsor for the Stadium Super Trucks, which Traxxas president Mike Jenkins-Traxxas's current owner- competed in during its inaugural season. During the 2016 season, Team Traxxas fielded trucks for Matthew Brabham and Sheldon Creed.
- Traxxas also sponsors athletes who compete in motocross. This includes Ryder DiFrancesco, Carson Mumford, Gage Schehr, Axell Hodges, and Justin Mulford.
- Traxxas was the lead sponsor for John Force Racing team member, Courtney Force, who is the daughter of John Force. Courtney Force drives the Traxxas Chevrolet Camaro SS Funny Car in the NHRA.
- Traxxas was a sponsor in the Championship Off-Road Racing (CORR) series until its demise in 2008. It took over as the title sponsor in an off-road racing series called the Traxxas TORC Series. Traxxas demonstrated its products at events and had a Traxxas Mobile Support Center on site. The Mobile Support Center carried Traxxas parts, cars, trucks, and boats. Traxxas' lead sponsorship of the TORC Series ended in 2014.
- Traxxas-sponsored drivers in short-course racing are Jenkins, Keegan Kincaid, RJ Anderson, and Jeremy McGrath.
- In 2010, Traxxas sponsored the No. 18 Toyota Tundra of Kyle Busch in the NASCAR Camping World Truck Series.

In the early 2000s, Traxxas sponsored the Traxxas T-Maxx monster truck with veteran driver John Seasock driving. The truck competed in the then national 4 Wheel Jamboree Series among many others.
