= IFMAR ISTC World Championship =

The IFMAR World Championship for 1:10 Electric Touring Cars. Asphault racing is the focused on 1:10 scale as has the touring car style bodies.

== Events ==
Edition			Event			Venue				Competitors			Ref.
No.	Date	Year	Car	Surface	Setting	Circuit	Location	Country	Bloc	No.	Nations	Bloc	Ref.
N/A		1998	ISTC	Asphalt	Outdoors	Temple Park Leisure Centre	South Shields, Newcastle upon Tyne	United Kingdom	EFRA				
1	15-17 Sept	2000		Asphalt	Indoors	Yatabe Arena	Tsukuba, Ibaraki	Japan					
2	16-18 May	2002	ISTC	Asphalt	Outdoors	Keywest Model Car Club	Krugersdorp, Gauteng	South Africa	FAMAR				
3	27-30 Oct	2004	ISTC	Asphalt	Outdoors	Kissimmee R/C Raceway	Kissimmee, Florida	United States					
4	5-8 July	2006	ISTC	Asphalt	Outdoors	AF Model Rings	Collegno	Italy	EFRA				
5	8 No	2008	ISTC	Asphalt	Outdoors	Radio Control Speedway	Bangkok	Thailand	FEMCA				
6	1-3 July	2010	ISTC	Asphalt	Outdoors	Modell-Auto-Club Burgdorf e.V.	Burgdorf, Hanover	Germany	EFRA				
7	26-28 July	2012	ISTC	Asphalt	Outdoors	Model Auto Club Heemstede	Heemstede	Netherlands	EFRA				
8		2014	ISTC	Asphalt	Outdoors	Full Throttle Raceway	Kissimmee, Florida	United States	ROAR				
9	24-27 Aug	2016	ISTC	Asphalt	Outdoors	Fengtai R/C Model Area	Beijing	China	FEMCA				
10	Aug	2018	ISTC	Asphalt	Indoors	Welkom RC Arena	Welkom	South Africa	FAMAR				
N/A	jULY	2020	ISTC	Asphalt	Outdoors	Heemstede, Netherlands		Netherlands					
11	14-18 SePt	2022	Mod	Asphalt	Outdoors	CLUB AUTOMODELLISTICO 5 COLLI	Gubbio	Italy					
1	14-18 SePt	2022	Spec	Asphalt	Outdoors	CLUB AUTOMODELLISTICO 5 COLLI	Gubbio	Italy					
12	11	2024	Mod			Finishline RC Raceway	Bakersfield	United States	ROAR				
2	11	2024	Spec			Finishline RC Raceway	Bakersfield	United States	ROAR				
N/A	1-4 Apr.	2016	ISTC	Asphalt	Outdoors		Foshan	China	FEMCA	CANCELLED			
13	11	2026	Mod			Huge RC Circuit	Bangkok	Thailand	FEMCA				
3	11	2026	Spec			Huge RC Circuit	Bangkok	Thailand	FEMCA				

== World Champion & Cars Specifications ==
Note the shaded parts are controlled equipment e.g. not the competitor's choice

Year	Cat.	Driver	Chassis			Motor		Power Electronics			Control Electronics			Tyres			Ref.
Year	Cat.	Driver	Brand	Model	Bodyshell	Brand	Model	ESC	Battery	Charger	Transmitter	Receiver	Servo	F	R	Insert	Ref.
1998 Cup		David Spashett (GBR)	Losi	Street Weapon	Andy's; Dodge Stratus												
2000		Atsushi Hara (JPN)	Yokomo	MR-4TC	YOKOMO; Dodge Stratus												
2002		Surikarn Chaidejsuriya (THA)	Tamiya	TRF414M	Protoform; Dodge Stratus												
2004		Marc Rheinard (GER)	Tamiya	TRF415MS	Protoform; Mazda 6												
2006	ISTC	Andy Moore (GBR)	Tamiya	TRF415MS	Protoform; Mazda 6												
2008		Marc Rheinard (GER)	Tamiya	TRF416	Protoform; Mazda 6												
2010		Marc Rheinard (GER)	Tamiya	TRF416X	Protoform; LTC-R												
2012		Jilles Groskamp (NED)	Tamiya	TRF417v5	Protoform; LTC-R												
2014		Naoto Matsukura (JPN)	Yokomo	BD7 15	Protoform; LTC-R												
2016		Ronald Völker (GER)	Yokomo	BD8	Protoform; LTC-R	LRP	X20 4.5T	LRP /Flow	LRP /5600mAh		Sanwa /M12S		Highest				
2018		Bruno Coelho (POR)	X-Ray	T4 ’18/19 Hybrid	Monotech; Racer body	Hobbywing	V10 G3 4.5T	Hobbywing /XR10 Pro	Sunpadow /5600mAh		Sanwa /M12S		BR /BC1863X				
2022		Bruno Coelho (POR)	X-Ray	X4’22	Xtreme	Hobbywing	V10 G3	Hobbywing /XR10 Pro	Sunpadow		Sanwa /M17		BR /BC				
2022		Alexandre Duchet (FRA)	X-Ray		Xtreme; Wolverine 0.5mm	Orca	13.5	Orca /OE1	Orca /6390								
2024	Spec	Simon Lauter (GER)	Awesomatix	A800R	ZooRacing; Wolverine	Hobbywing	V10 G4R 17.5T	Hobbywing /XR10 Pro G3X	Nosram /5100mAh								
2024	Mod	Bruno Coelho (POR)	X-Ray	X4’25	Xtreme; Twister Speciale	Hobbywing	V10 G3 4.5T	Hobbywing /XR10 Pro	Sunpadow /4600mAh		Futaba /10PX		Futaba /BR1				
2026	Spec	Lukas Ellerbrock (GER)	Awesomatix	A800RR					Team EAM 7000mAh								
2026	Mod	Marc Rheinard (GER)	X-Ray	X4’27	Xtreme; Speciale	Cayota					Flysky; NB4 Pro+		PowerHD				
