= Tamiya Sand Scorcher =

Electric radio controlled car kit

The Tamiya Sand Scorcher was the sixteenth 1/10-scale electric radio controlled car kit released by Japanese model manufacturer Tamiya Corporation. It was first introduced on December 15, 1979.

Topped with a plastic replica of a Volkswagen Baja Bug, the Sand Scorcher shared many parts with an earlier car, the "Rough Rider". Released a little over a month apart, both cars were constructed from components that were mostly metal, rather than plastic. Though heavy, this meant the Sand Scorcher was rugged. Adding to the model's detail was its suspension system which was closely patterned after that of a full-scale Volkswagen. All on board electronics were protected by a water-resistant clear plastic case, meaning the car could be driven through water without damage.

Of potential interest to both R/C and VW enthusiasts alike, mint-in-box examples of the Sand Scorcher command prices from US$2900 to US$5100 as certain original parts for this model are nearly impossible to find in brand new condition. The basic body shell was also used in two other Tamiya models, namely the Monster Beetle and the Blitzer Beetle, making it Tamiya's longest-running R/C body shell design. However the original Sand Scorcher edition of the body can be identified by the wider fenders, the separate door handles and the words "1/10 RC VW BUGGY" moulded into the inside of the roof. Later versions lack this detail, making the original version highly sought after by collectors.

Tamiya released a 30th Anniversary edition of the Sand Scorcher in March 2010, with only slight modifications to the original design including some die-cast parts and an ESC in place of the mechanical speed controller.

== Popular culture ==
The Tamiya Sand Scorcher appears in the 1986 Australian film "Malcolm", an award-winning comedy about a socially awkward young man living in Melbourne who becomes involved in a series of robberies, and who also happens to have a keen interest in hobbies.

In one scene in the film, Malcolm uses his Sand Scorcher to fetch bottles of milk from a nearby convenience store, without leaving the comfort of his home. In another scene he attaches a trailer, camera and a gun to the car, and by remotely controlling the car via the camera, uses it to hold up two security guards at a bank and steal a bag full of money.

== Specifications ==
- Scale: 1/10
- Chassis construction: Fibreglass plate with metal supports
- Transmission: Two-wheel-drive via a solid rear axle, with no differential
- Suspension: Front trailing arm and rear lower A-arm suspension
- Shock absorbers: Metal, oil-filled units
- Motor: Mabuchi RS-540
- Tires: Rubber paddle-type off-road tires in rear with narrow, ribbed front tires
- Original Tamiya catalogue number: Originally RA1016 and later 58016
