= Mabuchi Motor =

Japanese motor manufacturing company

Mabuchi Motor Company

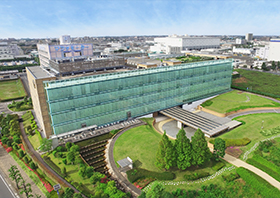
- Mabuchi Motor head office
- Native name: マブチモーター株式会社
- Type: Public
- Traded as: TYO: 6592
- Industry: Small DC motors
- Predecessor: Kansai Rika Kenkyusho (a scientific research institute), followed by Tokyo Science Industrial Co. Ltd., Japan Science and Industry Co. Ltd., Mabuchi Shoji Co. Ltd., Mabuchi Industrial Co., Ltd., and Tokyo Science Co., Ltd.
- Founded: 1946; 80 years ago
- Founder: Kenichi Mabuchi
- Headquarters: 430 Matsuhidai 270-2280, Matsudo, Chiba, Japan
- Number of locations: 10 sales offices, 13 factories and 2 R&D centers
- Area served: World
- Key people: Hiroo Okoshi (CEO); Shinji Kamei (chairman)
- Products: Small electric motors for automobiles, audiovisual equipment, home appliances, power tools, toys, etc.
- Production output: 1.4 billion small DC motors
- Revenue: ▲¥108.401 billion
- Operating income: ▲¥9.335 billion
- Net income: ▲¥10.519 billion
- Total assets: ▲¥227.253 billion
- Total equity: ▲¥20.704 billion
- Owner: Major shareholders include: Takaichi Mabuchi (7.2%); Mabuchi International Scholarship Foundation (4.3%); Japan Trustee Services Bank, Ltd. (Trust) (4.3%); The Master Trust Bank of Japan, Ltd. (Trust) (3.9%); Takashi Mabuchi (3.0%); Tamotsu Mabuchi (3.0%); Premiere Corporation (3.0%); Taka Corporation Co., Ltd. (3.0%); TEXAS Inc. (2.7%); The Bank of New York Non-Treaty JASDEC Account (1.9%)
- Number of employees: ▼25,843 worldwide, 740 in headquarters
- Divisions: Internal Audit Dept., Business Platform Innovation HQ, Cross Functional Team, IT, Corporate Planning, Admin. HQ, Operations Control HQ, Sales & Marketing HQ, R&D HQ, Quality Assurance
- Subsidiaries: 21 in total located in USA, Mexico, Germany, China & Hong Kong, Taiwan, South Korea, Vietnam, and Singapore
- Website: Official website
- Footnotes; All numbers, except for number of employees (2015), are for 2014 and taken from the 2014 annual report

Mabuchi Motor Company (マブチモーター株式会社, Mabuchi Mōtā Kabushiki Kaisha) is a Japanese manufacturing company based in Matsudo, Chiba Prefecture, Japan. It is the world's largest manufacturer by volume of small electric motors, producing over 1.4 billion motors annually. The company employs 24,286 people in its production division, 755 in its administrative division, 583 in its R&D division, and 219 in its sales division.

Mabuchi Motor holds 70% of the market for motors used with automotive door mirrors, door locks, and air conditioning damper actuators. Sales of power window lifter motors are on the rise. The company's ratio of consolidated markets is 64.3% automotive products and 35.7% consumer and industrial products. Applications for Mabuchi brushed DC electric motors and brushless electric motors include power drills, lawn mowers, vibrating cell phones and video game controllers, vibrators, vacuum cleaners, toy cars and planes, CD, DVD and Blu-ray players, digital cameras, computer printers, electric fans, electric razors, washing machines, electric tooth brushes, and blow dryers.

== Corporate governance ==
Mabuchi Motor's head office is located near Matsuhidai station on the Hokuso line linking Narita airport with downtown Tokyo. The company is managed by a board of directors which includes two outside directors. For the purpose of creating an environment for investors to invest more easily and for expanding liquidity and enlarging the investor base of the stock, Mabuchi Motor split each share of its common stock into two shares on January 1, 2015, with the number of shares outstanding rising from 37.875 million in 2014 to 70.927 million in 2015.

Name	Position
Takaichi Mabuchi	Honorary Chairman
Shinji Kamei	Chairman and representative director
Taniguchi Shinichi	President & CEO.
Tadashi Takahashi	Managing executive officer, general manager of R&D and director
Masato Itokawa	Executive officer, general manager of Quality Assurance Dept. and director
Tadahito Iyoda	Executive officer, general manager of admin. headquarters and director
Hirotaro Katayama	Executive officer, general manager of operations control and director
Iwao Nakamura	Outside director
Ichiro Hashimoto	Outside director
Masahiro Gennaka	Audit & supervisory board member (Full-time)
Keiichi Horii	Audit & supervisory board member (outside)
Nobutaka Motohashi	Audit & supervisory board member (outside)
Toru Masuda	Audit & supervisory board member (outside)
Tsuyoshi Nakamura	General manager of sales & marketing
Kazuyuki Someya	President of Mabuchi Industry Co., Ltd. (Hong Kong subsidiary)
Eiji Uenishi	Deputy general manager of research and development
Akihiko Kitahashi	In Charge of Taiwanese business
Katsuhiko Katayama	In Charge of Chinese business
Makoto Kimura	President of Mabuchi Industry Co., Ltd. (México subsidiary)
Mario Díaz Márquez	Deputy Director of Manufacturing of Mabuchi Industry Co., Ltd. (México subsidiary)

Takaichi Mabuchi, the company's co-founder and honorary chairman since March 28, 2013, has also been president and chairman of Mabuchi Motor Co., Ltd.

Shinji Kamei, chairman of Mabuchi Motor Co. Ltd., since March 28, 2013, has been the chief executive officer and president at Mabuchi Motor Co. Ltd. Kamei also its representative director.

Hiroo Okoshi has been chief executive officer and president of Mabuchi Motor Co. Ltd. since March 28, 2013. Okoshi previously was an executive officer and general manager of administration headquarters and as general manager of Corporate Planning Department. He has been a director since March 2011.

Tadashi Takahashi has been a managing executive officer of Mabuchi Motor Co. Ltd. since March 27, 2015. Takahashi has also been general manager of Research & Development Headquarters since March 28, 2013, and he was executive officer from March 28, 2013, to March 27, 2015. Takahashi was general manager of Production Engineering Innovation Center of research and development Headquarters until March 28, 2013. He has been a director since March 28, 2013.

Masato Itokawa is general manager of Quality Assurance Department and executive officer. He has been a director since March 28, 2013.

Tadahito Iyoda has been a general manager of Administration Headquarters and executive officer since March 28, 2013. Iyoda previously was general manager of the Corporate Planning Department and was also president of Mabuchi Motor at its headquarters in Mexico.

Hirotarou Katayama has been general manager of operations control headquarters since July 2014 and is its executive officer. Katayama has been a director since March 27, 2015.

Iwao Nakamura has been an outside director of Mabuchi Motor Co. Ltd., since March 28, 2013 and of Nagase & Co. Ltd. since 2009. He previously was executive officer at Nagase & Co. Ltd. and president of Nissan Diesel Motor Co. Ltd. of Volvo AB from 2002 to May 11, 2007. Nakamura was president of Nissan Diesel at AB Volvo from 2002 to July 11, 2007. Nakamura also is a director of Nissan Diesel Motor Co. Ltd.

Ichiro Hashimoto has been an outside director of Mabuchi Motor Co., Ltd., since March 27, 2015. He also is the chief operating officer of Niigata Power Systems Co., Ltd. and once was its president. In April 1970, Hashimoto joined Ishikawajima Harima Heavy Industry Co., Ltd. (IHI) and has been its director since April, 2008. Hashimoto was an executive vice president of IHI Corporation since April 2010. Since July 1998, Hashimoto was head of Soma Works of Aero-Engine & Space Operations of IHI, and was its executive officer and president of Power System Operations, managing executive officer and president of Energy and Plants Operations since January 2008, managing executive officer and president of Energy and Plants Operations since April 2008. He was the senior executive officer, managing executive officer and executive officer of IHI Corporation. He was a director of IHI Corporation starting in April 2010. Since June 2012, he has been a corporate advisor of IHI.

Masahiro Gennaka is full-time statutory auditor.

Keiichi Horii is an outside statutory auditor. Horii has also been an auditor of Sanwa Soko Co. Ltd. since June 2011. He became a registered lawyer (Dai-ichi Tokyo Bar Association) in April 1979. He was a partner of Harada, Uchida, and Sugiyama Law Office (now Toranomon Minami Law Office) since January 1995.

Nobutaka Motohashi has been an outside statutory auditor of Mabuchi Motor Co., Ltd. since March 2012 and NAGAWA Co., Ltd. since June of that year. He has also been a representative at CPA Motohashi Nobutaka Office since July 2008. Motohashi w =as a representative partner at audit corporation Ernst & Young ShinNihon LLC (formerly, Eiko Accountants Office) since May 1976. He joined audit corporation Ernst & Young ShinNihon LLC (formerly Ike Shoichi Office) in June 1971. Motohashi was registered as a certified public accountant in March 1973. He withdrew from Ernst & Young ShinNihon LLC (formerly Shin-Nihon Audit Corporation) in June 2008.

Toru Masuda is an outside statutory auditor.

Tsuyoshi Nakamura is general manager of sales & marketing headquarters and executive officer. Nakamura formerly was deputy general manager of Sales & Marketing Headquarters starting on March 28, 2013. Nakamura was the general manager of Sales Department 3 of the Sales & Marketing Headquarters until March 28, 2013.

Kazuyuki Someya is president of Mabuchi Industry Co., Ltd. (Mabuchi's Hong Kong based subsidiary). Someya has also been the general manager of the Accounting and Finance, Dept., Administration Headquarters.

Eiji Uenishi is deputy general manager of research and development.

Akihiko Kitahashi is the executive in charge of Taiwanese business.

Katsuhiko Katayama is the executive In Charge of Chinese Business.

=== Financial results ===
Year over year, Mabuchi Motor grew revenues from ¥108.4 billion JPY to ¥122.5 billion JPY. Moreover, the company has been able to reduce the percentage of sales devoted to cost of goods sold from 75.23% to 70.94%. This was a driver that led to a bottom line growth from ¥10.5 billion JPY to ¥18.1 billion JPY.

Net sales for fiscal year 2014 were ¥122.544 billion. Mabuchi forecasts sales of ¥141 billion for 2015. Gross profit for fiscal year 2014 was ¥35.614 billion. The company expects gross profit to rise to ¥42.7 billion by year-end 2015. China and Hong Kong comprised the largest regional market, at 34.8% of sales by region. This was followed by Asia Pacific at 24.7%, Europe at 20.3%, North and Latin America at 12.3% and Japan at 7.9%.

Capital expenditures for 2015 are expected to rise to ¥16.202 billion from ¥9.597 billion in 2014, in part due to the construction of new manufacturing facilities in Aguascalientes, Mexico. The factory is scheduled to begin production in 2016. R&D personnel will rise from 432 in 2014 to 464 in 2015, with R&D expenditures rising commensurately from ¥4.503 billion in 2014 to ¥5.27 billion in 2015. Total assets rose from ¥223.689 billion in June, 2014 to ¥259.129 billion in June, 2015, while inventories rose from ¥23.509 billion to ¥31.473 billion during the same period.

Mabuchi's basic dividend policy is to collect funds for research and development and capital investment, which are required for the company's growth and development, from internal reserves, to maintain financial soundness, and actively to carry out paying long-term stable dividends and returning Mabuchi's profits such as dividend increase and stock split according to performance. The ordinary dividend is annually ¥30 per share of common stock as a long-term stable dividend, plus a special dividend based on business results, which is calculated by dividing 30% of consolidated net income by the number of total stocks.

In 2012, the cash dividend per share was ¥50. The cash dividend forecast for 2015 is ¥105 per share. As of June, 2015, the composition of shareholders by category is 37.4% foreign companies, 22.5% individuals and others, 21.9% financial institutions, 15.3% domestic (Japanese) companies, 2.1% treasury stock and 0.9% financial instruments firms.

== History ==
=== 1930s-1940s ===
As an elementary school student living in Takamatsu, Kagawa Prefecture in the 1930s, Kenichi Mabuchi, the son of a tin plate factory owner, enjoyed inventing things such as a homemade washing machine, bamboo toy guns, helicopters, and a model boat that ran on alcohol (and which exploded and burned him when he switched out the alcohol for gasoline). In junior high school, Kenichi won the 5th Shikoku Model Airplane Tournament, beating his adult competition by crafting the plane with the longest flight duration.

==== World War II ====
Kenichi's brother, Takaichi, was ten years younger, and loved making things with his older brother. Takaichi entered a technical junior high school, but on the night of July 3, 1945, Takaichi's school was destroyed in the firebombing of Takamatsu by US B-29 warplanes.

In order to survive food shortages, their father sold the family's factory and put the brothers to work in the fields. But Kenichi soon quit working on the farm. He gathered his friends and scoured the burned ruins for metal and copper wire to use in making simple DC motors as educational tools for use in elementary schools. This "School Motor" sold well, and in 1946 Kenichi Mabuchi founded Kansai Rika Kenkyusho, a scientific research institute.

==== First postwar motor ====
In the summer of 1947, after a company in Osaka copied the design of the school motor, Kenichi realized the value of patent applications, then went back to the drawing board and invented the world's first high performance, "horseshoe-shaped" magnetic DC motor. Takaichi turned 18, left the farm, and began working with Kenichi in sales.

=== 1950s ===
In 1951, as Japanese wind-up toys lost credibility in the marketplace due to the introduction of power toys overseas, with exports dropping to 20% of the previous year, the Mabuchi brothers managed to secure a contract to supply the motor needs of a toy car manufacturer in Tokyo. Since their factory in Takamatsu was originally a sheet metal plant and had already reached capacity, Kenichi and Takaichi decided to relocate with 10 key employees and build a new factory in Tokyo, near their principal customer.

On January 18, 1954, using their patent for a new, smaller horseshoe-shaped motor as collateral to raise sufficient capital, the brothers established Tokyo Science Industrial Co., Ltd. for the production of small electric motors for toys and scientific apparatuses, with Kenichi Mabuchi as managing director and Takaichi Mabuchi as executive director. Takaichi soon had an idea for a new type of motor to power larger toys. Crafted from an alloy of iron, aluminum, and nickel, Takaichi's patented "alnico motor" proved more powerful than the one his older brother invented and just as easy to mass-produce.

==== Toy manufacturing ====
By August 1955, Japan Science and Industry Co., Ltd. was established as a joint venture with a major toy manufacturer, and an automatic armature coil winding apparatus was developed, thereby expanding production capacity to 30,000 motors per day. The machines were exceptionally loud but resulted in lower prices and cheaper toys for the children of Japan. But in September 1957, American newspapers reported that lead based paints were used on some toys imported from Japan. The Japanese toy industry was hit by a sharp drop in demand. The Mabuchi brothers, however, seized on this development as an opportunity to break away from their exclusive relationship with the toy manufacturer.

==== Exports ====
Export operations began in September 1957 with the creation of Mabuchi Shoji Co., Ltd. In the spring of 1958, Kenichi bought back his own company's shares and dissolved the joint venture with their toy producing customer. After dissolving Tokyo Science Industrial Co., Ltd. along with Japan Science and Industry Co., Ltd., Kenichi and Takaichi established Mabuchi Industrial Co., Ltd. The brothers worked together to refine their alnico motor by replacing the alnico magnet with a ferrite magnet, resulting in April 1958 in a utility model patent for a ferrite "F-type motor" with the same power of the alnico motor but at half the cost and weight. At 20 yen per motor, the Mabuchi brothers had matched the price of an old wind-up toy. The F-type motor became widely used in model cars.

In March 1959, with the advent of portable, cordless tape recorders, the Mabuchi brothers changed the company's name to Tokyo Science Co., Ltd. and developed a small, quiet tape recorder motor with long life and low electricity consumption.

=== 1960s ===
==== Audio equipment and timepieces ====
No longer satisfied with simply making motors for toys and determined to break into markets for high-tech consumer goods, Kenichi and Takaichi continually improved upon the F-type motor. They increased the precision of the shaft and improved the commutator and brush, reducing noise and power consumption to 10% of the original F-type motor and axis deviation to less than 10 microns, and extending lifespan by 50–100 times to 1,000–2,000 hours. In January 1960, the "FM-250 motor" was born, and, in April, high-precision "RM type" small electric motors were developed, leading Mabuchi into the audio equipment and timepiece markets.

By March 1962, the company opened a new factory in Tatebayashi, Gunma Prefecture, and achieved a daily production rate of 200,000 motors.

==== Slot cars ====
1963 saw the development of two of Mabuchi's most important motors. The first, released in April, was the FT, which became a popular choice for use in slot cars. The second major development, released in October, was the RS series. This motor put Mabuchi not only in the home appliance market but in the radio control market as well. RS motors like the RS 380 and RS 540 are still used today in car, boat and aircraft models. Also in October, in order to change the par value of its stock, Takamatsu Lumber Co., Ltd. (established 1926) was merged and the company name was changed to Tokyo Science Co., Ltd. At the same time, the headquarters was moved to Katsushika Ward in Tokyo.

==== Embezzlement of company funds ====
The Mabuchi brothers celebrated the tenth anniversary of Tokyo Science in late 1963 with a party at a restaurant in Akasaka, attended by over 1,000 company employees, as well as visitors from the toy industry, the financial sector, and the United States. After delivering the keynote address, Kenichi was approached by Takaichi who informed him of the results of an internal investigation. Certain people in upper management had secretly been adding extra charges to the costs of purchasing components. They pooled the money in a slush fund and used it to open another company. Kenichi was furious. He fired the ringleaders and asked anyone who knew about the theft and had failed to inform him to apologize straight away and promise to mend their ways. This scandal prompted the Mabuchi brothers to establish the Mabuchi management principle, "Contributing to international society and continuously increasing our contribution". An employee handbook was circulated, called "Purposes and Meanings of Company Business".

==== Production in Hong Kong ====
The Mabuchi brothers were also among the first Japanese executives to catch on to the international trend of developing production capacity overseas. Because a company in Hong Kong was making inferior quality copies of motors and selling them to British Commonwealth countries at low cost with the benefit of a preferential tariff, the Mabuchi brothers decided to build their own factory in Hong Kong and compete head to head. In February 1964, Mabuchi Industry Co., Ltd. was established in San Po Kong, Kowloon, Hong Kong.

==== Offices in US and Germany ====
In March 1965, Mabuchi moved its Japanese factory from a flood-prone area to a safe and large piece of land secured in Matsudo, Chiba (the current location of the corporate headquarters) just outside Tokyo. An American sales office was also opened in New York City. In April 1966, a compact, high-performance motor (RE type) went on the market, and in March of the following year, a submarine motor as a power source for toys and hobbies was also brought to market. Now the company was steadily growing, and by 1968, annual production had reached a volume of 100 million. In July that year, a new high-performance, low-cost motor (FA type) was introduced.

The European representative office was opened in Frankfurt, Germany, in October, 1968. In January 1969, with 100% financing from the parent company, Tohoku Mabuchi Co., Ltd. was established, increasing the capacity for processing components, and thus coping with a labor shortage (this subsidiary was moved to the city of Matsudo, and its name was changed first to Mabuchi Electric Industries Ltd. in July 1977, then to Mabuchi Finance in June 1989, before being liquidated in January 1998).

==== Production in Taiwan ====
Production expanded to Taiwan when new facilities were established there in December 1969 as Mabuchi Taiwan Co., Ltd. to form a motor supply network for the world market.

=== 1970s ===
==== The "custom made" problem ====
By the dawn of the 1970s, Mabuchi had become one of the world's leading producers of original equipment motors for consumer electronics, toys and model aircraft. But a new problem arose: the "custom made" problem. Usually in the manufacturing industry, making small quantities of many products was the norm, in order to meet market needs. So Mabuchi was taking orders for motors with different specs from each customer and manufacturing motors customized to the client's specifications each time. When production volume was small, the company managed to handle it, but by the 1970s, volume had grown and it became hard to handle all those orders with slightly different specs. The company was oversupplied with a variety of machines and parts. From buying materials, gathering components, machining and assembly, to shipping the products, the production line grew disorderly and difficult to manage. Moreover, there was a time gap between production and the slack of business, with orders mainly centering on customers' Christmas sales campaigns. Because of this, the company had to hire extra seasonal workers every year before the holidays when the factories grew too busy and then discharge them when the period was over and production became slow.

Mabuchi called this the "custom made" problem because it could not keep a back stock of custom spec orders. Since the company had to make the custom motors after it received an order, it took considerable time to deliver. So if the customer had an unexpected hit product, Mabuchi would struggle to meet the sudden increased demand. If turn around time was not quick enough, clients would become upset because they missed a business opportunity and Mabuchi would be giving up potential profits as well. Additionally, when orders came in all at once, factory workers would have to work overtime and on their days off to meet deadlines. The rate of defective products would go up, as would quality control problems and customer complaints. And the defective motors would need to be replaced, increasing pressure on the delivery dates.

==== Product standardization ====
The solution was product standardization. Rather than make tiny changes to shaft length and the number of coils in what was essentially the same motor, the company began making several standard products with 5mm notched shafts, reducing the number of possible 1mm or 2mm variations and allowing Mabuchi to transition into a stock production system. Customers were given the option to continue buying custom motors according to their specifications or to buy standardized motors on an inventory sales basis for a 20% discount. Product quality and delivery speed were improved while cost and waste were reduced, such that by June 1971 over 80% of Mabuchi motors were standard products.

In March 1971, the company's name was changed from Tokyo Science to Mabuchi Motor Co. Ltd. Then, in July, a new headquarters building was completed and the corporate headquarters was moved to Matsudo. The FA-130 motor was introduced. At the same time, Mabuchi was in talks with a world-class manufacturer of electric shavers which had a demand for a special core motor with the close to the same efficiency as a coreless motor. The Mabuchi brothers developed the motor, model RD-180, and it was smaller and more responsive than the electric shaver company's previous motor. Takaichi Mabuchi quoted a price per unit of 100 yen and the shaver company representative tried to correct Takaichi's supposed "mistake" of leaving off a zero, thinking the RD-180 should cost at least 1,000 yen. But Takaichi was quite serious and sold the shaver motor for a tenth of the price the shaver company was willing to pay. In so doing, he secured a supply contract for all of the shaver company's motor needs.

==== Cheaper boomboxes ====
Next, tape recorders changed from open-reel to cassette tape, and in 1972 the radio cassette deck, or "boombox", was released; it became a popular for personal use mainly among young people. As far as Mabuchi Motor was concerned, the key part of a radio cassette deck was that it must be able to spin quietly and stably to produce quality sound. The rotation speed could not change even with changes in voltage, temperature or load. A regular DC motor would not suffice; instead, the company had to develop a new motor with the capability to adjust its speed, a "governor motor". In the past, the company's engineers had experimented with both types of governor motor, mechanical and electronic governors. But since it would be difficult to reduce the price of a mechanical governor, while electronic governors were growing cheaper all the time, Takaichi Mabuchi decided to proceed with an electronic governor.

By manufacturing Japanese designed electronic governor motors overseas in Hong Kong and Taiwan, Mabuchi Motor reduced the cost of boomboxes through mass production of the motors that operated their cassette tapes. In December 1972, Mabuchi's exporting arm, Mabuchi World Trade Co., Ltd. (formerly Mabuchi Shoji Co., Ltd.), was merged with the domestic sales (business) division. A sales (business) department was opened at the site of Mabuchi World Trade Co., Ltd. (Nihonbashi, Chuo Ward, Tokyo). In order to expand production at Mabuchi Taiwan Co., Ltd., in October 1973 a new factory was constructed and existing production facilities were modernized. In March 1974, as part of efforts to streamline business management, new, high-precision machine tools reflecting the latest technology were introduced and added to the machine tool division of the main factory. In addition, Mabuchi Precision Industries, Ltd. was established in Tatebayashi City, Gunma Prefecture for in-house production of motor shafts. An airplane motor went on the market in July as a new power source for model airplanes.

In March 1975, a motor with a built-in electronic governor went on the market, allowing the company to move into new markets for cassette tape recorders, home stereo equipment and other household electronics. The RF-510G was born. It sold for 400 yen, the same price as an outdated mechanical governor. At first, electronics companies were somewhat leery of working with a supplier that got its start making motors for toy cars. But one after another, brand name manufacturers chose the quality and price of the RF-510G, and the Mabuchi brothers helped bring affordable Japanese radio cassette decks, portable headphone stereo CD players, and numerous other products in the audio visual field, to consumers across the world.

==== ATMs and car mirrors ====
By being first to market with a completed product while rival motor manufacturers were still at the prototype stage, Mabuchi Motor built considerable goodwill in the consumer electronics industry. Then, in May, nickel-cadmium batteries were introduced onto the market, and Mabuchi responded by producing a fast-action battery charger for home use as a low-energy electric power source. By July, the sales department moved to the headquarters at Matsudo, and a comprehensive administration system encompassing production, sales, technology and financial operations was established. In September 1975, a geared motor went on the market, allowing Mabuchi to enter the vending machine market and other markets. Also that month, car mirror motors came on the scene, and the company fully entered into the automobile electrical equipment market.

In order to increase competitiveness in a fluctuating world economy, and to expand productive capacity, in July 1976, a new production facility was constructed in Tsuen Wan by Mabuchi Industry Co., Ltd. of Hong Kong. Then, in August, a new power system went on the market for electrically powered radio-controlled models by combining a high-powered motor and nickel-cadmium battery that can be quickly recharged. The New York representative office was closed in January 1977 and, instead, Mabuchi Motor America Corp. was established in New York City for sales and service operations to respond directly to local needs and to focus on developing new markets (in 1997, the US head office was moved to Detroit).

In March 1978, Mabuchi Taiwan Co., Ltd. constructed a new factory at Hukou. A third Taiwanese production facility, at Kaohsiung, was added in August 1979.

=== 1980s ===
==== VCRs ====
In the early 1980s, Mabuchi entered both the VCR and battery-operated power tool markets. In 1980, a VCR motor was introduced to the market, and Mabuchi Motor fully entered the video equipment market. As a result, in December of that year, Mabuchi Motor Taiwan Ltd. enlarged its production facilities. In 1981, an electric drill motor emerged onto the market, and the company fully entered the industrial equipment market. Then, in August 1982, the Tateishi Factory of Mabuchi Electric Industries Ltd. was established in Katsushika Ward, Tokyo.

==== Portable CD players ====
From the start of the CD player era, Mabuchi Motor was selected by major Japanese and European audiovisual manufacturers to supply standardized CD player motors such as the RF-310TA and the RF-300CA. With their overwhelming product levels, the Mabuchi brothers secured a 90% share of the CD player business, spurring rival companies to surrender.

The audiovisual device field, and the precision instrument field, had a huge impact on the motor industry. In March 1984, Mabuchi Motor Taiwan Ltd. constructed a second factory. Then, in April, the corporate headquarters were moved to Matsudo, near Matsuhidai Station, halfway between Narita International Airport and downtown Tokyo on the Hokuso Line.

==== Initial public offering (IPO) ====
In July, Mabuchi Taiwan Co., Ltd. expanded its Hukou factory. That same month, through registration in the over-the-counter market, Mabuchi Motor initiated the public sale of its stock shares. By October, Mabuchi's Technical Center reached completion. In addition to concentrating research and development activities in a single facility and promoting technical information sharing, the center was equipped with high-tech research facilities.

The development of a heavy-duty printer motor in 1985 led to Mabuchi's entry into the office equipment market. In March 1986, the Guangdong factory of Mabuchi Industry Co., Ltd. in Guangdong, China, started processing and manufacturing activities on a commission basis. Mabuchi Motor went public on the Tokyo Stock Exchange in December 1986 and was listed as a member of the second section.

In March 1987, so as to grasp the tendencies and needs of the Singapore and ASEAN markets at top speed, a representative office was set up in Singapore. Then, in October, the first Chinese subsidiary company totally financed by Japanese enterprises, Mabuchi Motor Dalian Ltd., was established and the supply system for the world market was strengthened.

Mabuchi Motor Shenzhen Ltd. was established in Shenzhen, China, in April 1988, to carry out maintenance of the manufacturing equipment of the Guangdong factory of Mabuchi Industry Co., Ltd. and to manufacture tools (in 1997, the company was closed and integrated with Dongguan Mabuchi Motor Equipment Co., Ltd.). In June 1988, Mabuchi's listing rose from the second section of the Tokyo Stock Exchange to the first section.

==== Power windows ====
A power-window motor was released in 1989, and the company entered the automobile power window market. In order to respond better to the needs of the American automotive industry and to increase participation in the automobile market, Mabuchi Motor opened the Mabuchi Motor America Corporation Detroit Sales Office in April 1989. Later that August, Mabuchi Motor (Malaysia) Sdn. Bhd. was established in Malaysia in order to augment the production capacity of Mabuchi Taiwan Co., Ltd. Then, in September, reflecting the growing importance of the ASEAN market, and to respond better to market movements and consumer needs, Mabuchi Motor replaced the Singapore representative office by setting up Mabuchi Motor (Singapore) Pte. Ltd.

=== 1990s ===
==== Mabuchi Technology Center ====
In 1991, Mabuchi Motor Co. Ltd. increased its ownership equity in Mabuchi Taiwan Co., Ltd. to approach the full control which the parent company exercised over its wholly owned subsidiaries. Next, in April 1992, the Mabuchi Technology Center was completed in Motono in Chiba Prefecture, for in-depth research and development of small electric motors. In May, the number of the company's shares per unit was changed from 1,000 to 100. Then, in October, Mabuchi Industry Co., Ltd. opened its Guangzhou sales office to strengthen marketing activities in China.

==== Factories in mainland China ====
New operations in Europe and China began in 1993. Mabuchi Motor (Jiangsu) Co., Ltd. was established in Jiangsu, China in November to meet increasing demand from customers whose factories were also located in China. At the same time, the European representative office was closed and Mabuchi Motor (Europe) GmbH was established in Frankfurt, Germany to handle business expansion and to improve services for clients in the European market. In April 1994, Dongguan Mabuchi Motor Equipment Co., Ltd. was established in Guangdong, China to provide engineering services for the Guangdong Factory of Mabuchi Industry Co., Ltd. and to train factory engineers. And in September, Mabuchi Motor Wafangdian Ltd. was established in Wafangdian near Dalian, China, to meet increasing demand. That same month, the parent company agreed to an investment increase for Mabuchi Motor (Jiangsu) Co., Ltd. with Mabuchi Motor Co. Ltd.'s total investment ratio reaching 92%, and 93% by July 1995.

In September 1995, Mabuchi Precision Industries Hong Kong Ltd. was established in Hong Kong to produce motor shafts in Guangdong, China (in 2006, in order to continue shaft production in Guangdong Province, the company specified the Ludong factory of Mabuchi Precision Industries Hong Kong Ltd. as a contract processing factory of Mabuchi Industry Co., Ltd., and dissolved Mabuchi Precision Industries Hong Kong Ltd.).

==== Manufacturing in Vietnam ====
In February 1996, Mabuchi Motor Vietnam Ltd. was established in Bienhoa near Ho Chi Minh City, Vietnam, with 100% financing from the parent company to meet increasing demand and to expand the labor force. The Guangzhou office of Mabuchi Industry Co., Ltd. was closed in March 1997 and a new representative office was opened in Shanghai to improve customer service and marketing activities in the Chinese market. By July 1999, the ISO 9000 series and QS 9000 series, international quality management and quality assurance standards, were received by every Mabuchi facility that applied for certification.

=== 2000s ===
==== ISO 14001 certification ====
As of March 2001, all operating sites had acquired ISO 14001 certification, an international standard for environmental management systems. In December 2001, Mabuchi Motor Company received the first Porter Prize awarded to corporations and businesses that have implemented superior strategies in innovation. Then, in 2002, Mabuchi Motor was selected by the Council on Economic and Fiscal Policy as "Japan's 10 excellent corporations that have constructed a world-class business model". Also in 2002, Mabuchi Motor started to co-sponsor events such as the ABU Asia-Pacific Robot Contest and the Colleges of Technology Robot Contest, which contribute to the training of young technicians and development of science and technology.

==== Home invasion, murder and arson ====
In 2002, Takaichi Mabuchi's wife, Etsuko, 66, and daughter Yuka, 40, were murdered during a home invasion and his house was burned to the ground. The women were killed before the fire and a cord was found around each of their necks. The two killers poured petrol around the house and made off with ¥9.7 million worth of cash and jewelry. In 2006, Tetsuo Odajima, 63, pleaded guilty in Chiba District Court to killing the wife and daughter of the former Mabuchi Motor Co. chairman and two other people in three robbery-murder cases in 2002. According to the indictment, Odajima conspired with Katsumi Morita, 55, who pleaded guilty in February in his trial in the Tokyo District Court, to break into the home of Mabuchi Motor President Takaichi Mabuchi, 73, in Matsudo, Chiba Prefecture, in 2002. The killers were sentenced to death by hanging in 2008.

==== Power seat motor ====
In April 2002, the company's power unit motor department was established. A power seat motor was released, and the company entered the automobile power seat market. New power window motors developed on the basis of a new concept were also released, strengthening the line-up of power window products for automobiles. That November, in order to strengthen the sales system for the expanding China market, Mabuchi Motor (Shanghai) Co., Ltd. was established, while the Shanghai representative office was dissolved. In August 2003, the company established its Santa Clara office in California in order to strengthen the sales system in the West Coast (in 2008, the office was closed and integrated with Mabuchi Motor America Corp.).

Growth continued in China as well as the United States. The oil retaining bearing plant construction was completed in October 2003 at Mabuchi Motor Dalian Ltd. and in-house production of oil retaining bearing started. Then, in April 2004, Mabuchi Motor acquired all remaining shares held by minority shareholders of Mabuchi Taiwan Co., Ltd., transforming the branch into a 100% held subsidiary. The Dongguan representative office opened in Dongguan to strengthen the sales base in South China. That October, a new plant was constructed at Dongguan Mabuchi Motor Equipment Co., Ltd. to strengthen the supplementary functions, in China, of the head office and to centralize the production equipment and the production of precision parts. In 2004, Takaichi Mabuchi received his 17th US patent.

==== Ethical standards ====
April 2005 saw the creation of the Mabuchi Motor Compliance Manual (now known as Mabuchi Motor Ethical Standards) which provided explicitly the standards to be observed in executing the company's work. That November, the company opened the Mabuchi Motor Historical Center of Technology for the purpose of correctly communicating and passing down Mabuchi's history and "DNA" to the company's employees and contributing to the practice of the Mabuchi Management Philosophy created by its founders. The same month, Mabuchi Motor Korea Co., Ltd. was founded to reinforce Mabuchi's business infrastructure in the Korean market. In April 2006, the company launched the "Hot Line" for the purposes of whistle-blower protection and answering questions regarding the "Mabuchi Motor Ethical Standards" and preventing activities which conflict with the Standards. Later, in August, the company opened Dongguan Mabuchi Motor Equipment Co., Ltd. Motor Research & Development Center in order to carry out activities for designing products and developing production technologies in China in conjunction with the head office.

A year later, Mabuchi Motor developed compact high-torque motors for automotive products. And in January, 2008, Mabuchi founded the Mabuchi Motor Trading (Shenzhen) CO., Ltd. in Shenzhen, China, for the purpose of strengthening both customer service and distribution system in southern China. The Dongguan representative office handed over its corporate functions to the new sales office and was dissolved to form a better organization. In June, a new power seat motor was released. In February 2009, Dongguan Mabuchi Motor Equipment Co., Ltd. changed the name of company to Mabuchi Motor (Dongguan) Co., Ltd. and it started motor production in April 2009. That June, Mabuchi Motor Danang Ltd. expanded its facility to optimize motor production. A month later, Mabuchi Motor (Yingtan) Co., Ltd. was established with the aim of enhancing cost competitiveness by creating small and flexible production management.

==== Corporate officer system ====
As of November 2009, Mabuchi introduced its corporate officer system (executive officer system) to respond the change in management climate and enhance corporate governance according to generally accepted management principles. In China that next month, Mabuchi Industry Co., Ltd. established Mabuchi Precision (Dongguan) Co., Ltd. for business succession at the location of Mabuchi Industry Co., Ltd. Ludong factory with the purpose of stabilizing long time business operation for Mabuchi's precision parts production base.

By the 21st century, Takaichi Mabuchi had taken over as chairman of Mabuchi Motor, and Shinji Kamei was appointed president. Older brother Kenichi Mabuchi died in 2005. Takaichi determined to carry on his legacy. And so, while listening to an MP3 of Wagner he received as a present from his grandson and riding in a luxury car, Takaichi asked Shinji how progress was going in expanding the company's automobile electronic component field. CD players were losing popularity but the automotive market for small electric motors was booming. In an ordinary automobile, 50 to 60 small motors control everything from door locks and power windows to power seats, steering locks, air conditioner dampers, car mirrors, head lamps, navigation systems and audio visual equipment. But in a luxury car like the one Takaichi and Shinji were riding in, over 100 small electric motors are used.

Part of the profits earned through developing low cost motors is used to sponsor crafting workshops, model car events, and robot building competitions. The company also supports education by building elementary schools and sponsoring scholarships in China. Mabuchi Motor contributes to regional grassroots environmental protection activities as well.

=== 2010s ===
In February 2010, Mabuchi received the Corporate Activity Award from the Tokyo Stock Exchange in recognition of its pioneering corporate activities for corporate code of conduct in listing rules.

Then, in October, the company terminated production at Guandong Factory No.2 and converted Guandong Factory No.1 into a wholly foreign-owned enterprise. Mabuchi Motor Dongguan Daojiao Co., Ltd. was established. The following month, Guandong Factory No.3 was converted into a branch firm of Mabuchi Motor (Dongguan) Co., Ltd. In May 2011, to pursue cost competitiveness for surviving against international competition, Mabuchi established Mabuchi Motor (Jiangxi) Co., Ltd, which became its second production base in Jiangxi Province, China. To enhance customer service and sales structure for growing domestic markets in China, Mabuchi launched its China Sales Promotion & Support Dept. in August 2011, and established Mabuchi Motor (Shanghai) Co., Ltd. Chongqing Branch in Chongqing, China in November.

==== China Business Unit ====
Then, in January 2012, Mabuchi inaugurated its China Business Unit (CBU), in which three factors, namely production, sales and technology, are combined with each other, and started product development, mass-production and sales to meet local needs. In line with the second phase of production base reorganization, the company launched a new base to strengthen the existing bases. In November, Mabuchi Motor (Jiangxi) Co., Ltd. started its operations. In November, the second factory of Mabuchi Motor (Yingtan) Co., Ltd. was completed. In December, a new factory specialized for a motor for power window lifters and power seats was completed in Jiangsu.

==== Printer/scanner/copier motors ====
December saw the release of an inner-rotor-type brushless motor, and Mabuchi entered the market of an application for driving all-in-one devices, each of which is capable of functioning as a copier/fax/printer. In January 2013, a sales division was established at Mabuchi Motor (Jiangsu) Co., Ltd. and cumulative production and sales quantity of all the motors since the company establishment exceeded 40 billion units.

==== Building Mexico Mabuchi ====
In August 2014, the company established Mabuchi Motor Mexico S.A. de C.V., wholly owned by Mabuchi Motor Co., Ltd., so as to be closer to clients in North America. From 2010 to 2015, net sales increased from approximately 80 billion JPY to 108 billion JPY.

== Company strategy ==
Mabuchi Motor is pursuing a strategy of developing motors with quieter operation and longer operating life, using better materials and processing accuracy. One specific focus has been on motors for automotive products for which demand is expected to increase in future, especially as electric vehicles become increasingly popular. Therefore, Mabuchi is directing its attention to developing not only small motors but also mid-sized motors.

=== Worldwide presence ===
In order to "contribute to the leveling of international economic disparities and to economic development in other countries by creating employment opportunities and technology transfers," Mabuchi Motor engaged in globalization early, beginning in 1964 with its Hong Kong operations and continuing to its current establishment of Mexico Mabuchi.

==== Administrative and sales offices ====
In addition to its headquarters in Matsudo, Chiba, the Mabuchi Motor Group has sales offices in Troy, Michigan (USA) (Mabuchi Motor America Corp., est. 1977), Frankfurt am Main (Germany) (Mabuchi Motor Europe GmbH, est. 1993), Hong Kong (Mabuchi Industry Co. Ltd., est. 1964), Jiangsu (China) (Mabuchi Motor Jiangsu Co., Ltd., est. 1993), Shanghai (China) (Mabuchi Motor Shanghai Co. Ltd., est. 2002), Shenzhen (China) (Mabuchi Motor Trading Shenzhen Co. Ltd., est. 2008), Hsinchu (Taiwan) (Mabuchi Taiwan Co., Ltd., est. 1969), Singapore (Mabuchi Motor Singapore Pte. Ltd., est. 1989), Da Nang (Vietnam) (Mabuchi Motor Danang Ltd., est. 2005) and Seoul (South Korea) (Mabuchi Motor Korea Co., Ltd., est. 2005).

==== Manufacturing plants ====
Its factories are located in China (Dalian, Dongguan, Jiangsu, Yingtan, Jiangxi and Wafangdian), Vietnam (Biên Hòa and Danang), and Taiwan (Hsinchu and Kaohsiung). The company has 2 plants in Aguascalientes, Mexico (Mabuchi México SA de CV, est. 2014) The first plant is currently in operation and is planning to start operations at its third recently built plant, in this city, production is focused on the local, national and international automotive market.

==== Research and development facilities ====
Mabuchi Motor conducts research and development activities at its Technology Center in Inzai, Chiba, Japan, as well as its R&D Center in Dongguan, China.

==== Global internship program ====
Since 2011, Mabuchi Motor has welcomed summer interns, including engineering and business students and Global Law Fellows, from internationally renowned universities such as the University of Illinois at Urbana-Champaign (UIUC) and Brigham Young University (BYU). Foreign interns have contributed to the company's research and development, quality assurance, sales contracts and antitrust compliance measures. President Hiroo Okoshi encouraged student interns to contribute to a "breakthrough," saying: "The best way to predict the future is to create it by ourselves."

=== Main financial institutions ===
Mabuchi Motor Co. Ltd. conducts its banking activity mainly with the following financial institutions:

- MUFG Bank
- Mizuho Bank
- Sumitomo Mitsui Banking Corporation
- Chiba Bank
- Resona Holdings

=== Major clients ===
Some of Mabuchi Motor's major clients are:

- Aisin Seiki
- Carl Braun Camera-Werk
- Canon
- Denso
- Hewlett-Packard
- Lexmark
- Nikon
- Philips
- Pioneer Corporation
- Procter & Gamble
- Robert Bosch
- Brose Fahrzeugteile
- Mazda
- Honda
- Sony

== Manufacturing and product lines ==
Mabuchi Motor currently manufactures small electric motors in 10 factories located in Asia, with an 11th factory in Mexico under construction. For 2015, the company anticipates 33.4% of its motors will be made in Vietnam Mabuchi, 18.8% in Daojiao Mabuchi, 14.1% in Danang Mabuchi, 13.3% in Wafangdian Mabuchi, 5.8% in Dalian Mabuchi, 4.8% in Dongguan Mabuchi, 3.6% in Yingtan Mabuchi, 3.3% in Jiangxi Mabuchi, 2.0% in Jiangsu Mabuchi, and 0.8% in Taiwan Mabuchi.

Recently, Mabuchi has accelerated the pace of R&D into higher-performance motors, especially for use in automotive applications. The trend toward electric cars means that new automobiles will require increasingly large numbers of small electric motors to support movement and control of a variety of automotive electrical equipment.

=== Automotive products ===
An automotive products forecast of 67.3% of total motor sales is expected for 2015 year's end. Mabuchi Motor supplies automobile manufacturers with over a hundred variants of small DC motors for use in a variety of applications, such as:

- Power window lifters (including model GD-558 RC/LC, a new generation power window motor achieving lower mass and weight reduction)
- Power seats (including model RZ-46BWA, a low mass and high torque motor contributing to weight reduction of power seats)
- Parking brakes (including model RS-656WA, a motor pursuing low vibration, long life and high rigidity)
- Window washer pumps
- Engine peripheral equipment (including model RS-4F5WA, a motor adapted for use in the extreme conditions of engine intake and exhaust systems)
- Automatic cruise control
- Sunroofs
- Seat belt pretensioners
- Steering column adjusters
- Door closers
- Lumbar supports
- Door locks (including model FC-280SC, a standard motor for door lock actuators with a strong track record)
- Car mirrors (including model SF-266SA, a motor achieving low mass and noise reduction, providing quieter operation of power folding mirrors)
- Air conditioning damper actuators (including model SF-266SH, a motor achieving low mass and noise reduction, effective for use of multiple dampers)
- Headlight level adjusters
- Idle-speed controllers
- Quarter vents
- Active grille shutters
- Steering locks
- Trunk opener
- Fuel-tank lid opener
- Built-in car CD/DVD players

=== Consumer and industrial products ===
Sales of motors for consumer and industrial products is expected to comprise 32.7% of total motor sales by year-end 2015. Mabuchi Motor also supplies consumer goods manufacturers in a number of industries with motors used numerous types of finished products, such as:

==== Personal care products ====
- Electric shavers
- Electric tooth brushes
- Hair dryers (including model RS-365SV, the latest model of Mabuchi's standard motor for dryers with an extensive track record)
- Styling brushes
- Hair removers
- Hair clippers

==== Power tools ====
- Impact wrenches
- Screwdrivers
- Drills (including model RZ-735VA, a motor with lighter weight, contributing to the lower mass of power tools)
- Hedge trimmers
- Circular saws
- Lawn mowers

==== Health and wellness ====
- Blood pressure meters (including model FF-M10VA, a motor providing small home healthcare equipment with low mass and high controllability)
- Vibrators
- Massagers

==== Bikes, toys and household goods ====
- Electrically assisted bicycles (light electric vehicles)
- Walking assists
- Coffee makers
- Small sprayers
- Small pumps
- Electric locks (including model FF-N20WA, a motor achieving low mass, high output, and quiet operation)
- Vacuum cleaners
- Room fresheners
- Electric reels
- Toys
- Miniature models

==== Precision and office equipment ====
- Ink jet printers (including model ID-529XW, a brushless motor achieving more energy conservation, quieter operation, and lighter weight)
- Multi function printers (including model RK-370VB, a motor achieving low mass and higher output, contributing to the downsizing of office equipment)
- Laser printers (including model RS-645VA, a motor achieving high controllability together with high torque and light weight, with optical encoder)
- Vending machines (including model RK-370CA, the standard model widely usable for ejector and conveyor commodities, processing bills, coins, etc.)
- Digital cameras
- Photo printers

==== Audiovisual equipment ====
- Car CD players
- DVD players
- Car navigation systems
- Heads-up displays

=== Technical specifications ===
Mabuchi motors are designated by a seven-digit type code, followed by three to six digits designating the armature winding specifications. Motor housing is either flat, round or square. Housing length varies according to intended application. Brushes are either metal, precious metal or carbon in construction. The main types of magnet used are C-shape isotropic magnets, ring shape isotropic magnets, anisotropic or rare-earth magnets, or rubber magnets, with a magnet wire diameter ranging from 0.11mm to 1.1mm. Armature poles vary in number from 3 poles to 12 poles, while the number of turns of armature winding per slot can vary from figures of 2 to 4 digits.

==== Motor parts ====
A completed Mabuchi motor consists of 23 separate parts: endbell; shaft support; spacer; bearing; brush holder; terminal; damper; brush; oil stopper; varistor; commutator segment retainer; commutator segment; commutator core; insulating lamination; laminated core; magnet wire; more insulating lamination; shaft; rotor brush; another oil stopper; magnet; bearing; and, finally, the motor housing itself.

==== Theory behind motors ====
Each motor ships with a torque based performance chart showing the relationship between torque and speed, which is the most important performance indicator for a motor. The no-load speed is the number of rotations per minute of the motor shaft when voltage is applied between the terminals with no load to the motor. No-load current is the current discharged when voltage is applied between the terminals with no load to the motor. Stall torque is when the motor rotation stalls upon increasing the load to the rotating motor, while stall current is when the motor rotation stalls upon increasing the load to the rotating motor. The physics formula E = M (electrical energy input equals mechanical energy output) demonstrates the conservation of energy principle at work in a Mabuchi motor (voltage x current) divided by (efficiency expressed as a percentage) equals (speed in revolutions per minute x torque mN.m g.cm).

==== Factors affecting motor performance ====
Motor performance depends on three elements such as voltage across terminals, resistance across terminals, and magnetic force. These are influenced directly by such factors as voltage and type of power supply, number of turns per winding slot and diameter of magnetic wire, environmental temperature, type of magnet, flux yoke and phase. If only the voltage of the power supply changes, the change in motor performance is in direct proportion to that change in voltage. Unlike the constant-voltage power supply, the power supply with resistance will have a voltage drop due to its internal resistance, causing the stall current and, therefore, the stall torque to drop with the speed line bottomed to the left.

The winding specifications affect motor performance the most. Changing the number of turns per slot or the diameter of magnet wire produces results that differ greatly from each other. Environmental temperature affects the magnetic forces of magnets and the winding resistance, and so indicates changes in motor performance. Changing anisotropic magnets from wet to dry results in decreasing stall torques and increasing no-load speed due to the magnetic force being weakened. Magnets are held in a housing for their full capability, while using a thin-wall housing will result in magnetic force leaking through the housing wall. That is where magnet yokes are used to prevent magnetic leakage, thus maintaining the full capacity of the magnets. Phase refers to positional relations between the center line of each polar magnet and the switching position of commutator segments and brushes. Lagging in phase causes inefficiency, electrical noise, and shortened life. To avoid these situations, improved motors are assembled with forward brush-shifting that offsets the armature reaction during load operation to keep them on neutral electrically.

== Environmental record ==
Mabuchi Motor identified global warming as a major issue and, therefore, committed to use resources more efficiently, reduce waste, and conduct environmentally friendly manufacturing operations, including green procurement.

=== Environmental management system and guidelines ===
Mabuchi has built an environmental management system, with the director acting as environmental management representative. Starting from the headquarters obtaining ISO 14001 certification in December 1999, an international standard for environmental management, all overseas production sites at that time obtained this certification by 2001. Since then, the Mabuchi Group has been conducting regular audits by external certification organizations and internal audits within the group. In October 2005, Mabuchi developed a system for unified operation/management of this environmental management system and a quality management system.

Mabuchi implemented its 4th Management Guideline concerning the environment in 2008 to "conduct corporate activity which preserves the earth's environment and protects human health." Mabuchi describes pollution by corporations as "suicidal behavior" that "endangers our existence." The company has sworn that, if the natural ecology of waterways or the atmosphere is negatively impacts by its manufacturing operations, the pollution prevention measures in place at that particular plant are to be judged inefficient and new measures shall be implemented immediately.

With respect to working conditions at a plant, employee safety is Mabuchi's primary consideration. Those responsible for plant operations work on location and are held responsible for safety standards in the workplace. Once a health hazard is identified, action is to be taken immediately to remedy the situation. Mabuchi does not tolerate holding back funds required to implement safety measures in order to improve a plant's balance sheet.

=== Energy conservation, recycling and waste reduction ===
The Mabuchi Group changed the layout of its factories and the production process aiming to improve productivity and energy conservation, while reducing electricity and water usage and CO_{2} emissions at the same time. In addition, Mabuchi has improved the yield percentage of material for efficient use of resources. The company is also analyzing the content and volume of waste across the group and working on reduction as well as improvements in the recycling rate toward zero emissions. In terms of environmentally hazardous substances, Mabuchi is rolling out production activities based on the motto "do not include, do not mix, do not emit" hazardous substances. Mabuchi Motor's procurement is conducted globally, and in purchasing various types of materials, the company promotes green procurement, giving priority to purchasing products from business partners who are working on environmental preservation. On the production and shipment front, Mabuchi aims to minimize use of fuel and resources at storage locations by locating its warehouses close to its customers.

=== Environmental activities ===
The Mabuchi Group conducts periodic environmental education activities, including greening factory grounds by planting trees, as part of operations in its environmental management system. The company also shares environmental information through a company newsletter and intranet while holding environment-related events such as a "Poster/Photo Contest Promoting Environmental Consideration," providing opportunities for employees to think about the environment on a daily basis. Community clean-up and greening activities by Mabuchi employees are held on an ongoing basis. Volunteering employees are participating in community-oriented environmental activities in business offices at home and abroad.

== Corporate social responsibility (CSR) ==
Mabuchi Motor engages in certain specific corporate citizenship activities. First, the company promotes access to education in China. Starting 1996, the Dalian subsidiary built three Mabuchi Hope Elementary Schools and the company continues to supply equipment and funds for school trips. Dalian Mabuchi set up the Mabuchi High School Scholarship at the Dalian Education Foundation in 1997 to provide access to education for students of all ages with disabilities or who suffer from economic hardship. In 2007, a Mabuchi Hope Junior High School was established in China's Liaoning province.

Second, Mabuchi has supported young engineers by co-sponsoring many sorts of robotics competitions every year since 2002. Mabuchi provides funds and motors to support young people who participate in these robot building contests. Since 1983, the company has operated an exhibition corner in the Science Museum of Chiyoda-ku, Tokyo. Mabuchi also provides motors to participants in events held by the Japan Science Museum Association. The company has also been compiling its hobby craft guidebook every year from more than 30 years and has supported slot car racing since 1961.

Third, the company educates local employees as leaders, regardless of their nationality, provides skill improvement training, and human resource development and benefit packages tailored to each region where Mabuchi operates.

== See also ==
- Electric motor manufacturing industry in China
- Timeline of the electric motor
