= Sheldon Creed =

American racing driver (born 1997)

- Creed at Las Vegas Motor Speedway in 2026
- Born: Sheldon Michael Creed; September 30, 1997 (age 29); Alpine, California, U.S.
- Height: 5 ft 8 in (1.73 m)
- Weight: 188 lb (85 kg)
- Achievements: Stock Cars: 2020 NASCAR Gander RV & Outdoors Truck Series Champion; 2018 ARCA Racing Series Champion; 2015, 2016 Stadium Super Trucks Champion; Karting: 2014 LOORRS Pro Lite Unlimited Champion; 2012 LOORRS SuperLite Champion; 2010 LOORRS Junior 2 Karts Champion; 2009 LOORRS Junior 1 Karts Champion; 2009 LOORRS Modified Karts Champion

NASCAR Cup Series career
- 1 race run over 1 year
- 2023 position: 60th
- Best finish: 60th (2023)
- First race: 2023 Hollywood Casino 400 (Kansas)
| Wins | Top tens | Poles |
|---|---|---|
| 0 | 0 | 0 |

NASCAR O'Reilly Auto Parts Series career
- 169 races run over 8 years
- Car no., team: No. 26 (Sam Hunt Racing)
- 2026 position: 4th
- Best finish: 4th (2026)
- First race: 2017 Mid-Ohio Challenge (Mid-Ohio)
- Last race: 2026 O'Reilly Auto Parts 300 (Homestead)
- First win: 2026 Bennett Transportation & Logistics 250 (Atlanta)
- Last win: 2026 Food City 300 (Bristol)
| Wins | Top tens | Poles |
|---|---|---|
| 3 | 91 | 6 |

NASCAR FedEx Freight Truck Series career
- 76 races run over 7 years
- 2022 position: 106th
- Best finish: 1st (2020)
- First race: 2016 Aspen Dental Eldora Dirt Derby (Eldora)
- Last race: 2022 XPEL 225 (COTA)
- First win: 2020 Buckle Up in Your Truck 225 (Kentucky)
- Last win: 2021 In It To Win It 200 (Darlington)
| Wins | Top tens | Poles |
|---|---|---|
| 8 | 37 | 1 |

ARCA Menards Series career
- 39 races run over 4 years
- Best finish: 1st (2018)
- First race: 2016 Music City 200 (Nashville Fairgrounds)
- Last race: 2019 Kansas ARCA 150 (Kansas)
- First win: 2018 Zomongo 200 (Michigan)
- Last win: 2018 Kansas ARCA 150 (Kansas)
| Wins | Top tens | Poles |
|---|---|---|
| 4 | 28 | 5 |

ARCA Menards Series East career
- 4 races run over 1 year
- Best finish: 17th (2017)
- First race: 2017 Jet Tools 150 (New Smyrna)
- Last race: 2017 National Fallen Firefighters Association 125 (Dover)
| Wins | Top tens | Poles |
|---|---|---|
| 0 | 2 | 0 |

ARCA Menards Series West career
- 3 races run over 2 years
- Best finish: 27th (2017)
- First race: 2017 Sunrise Ford 150 (Orange Show)
- Last race: 2018 Star Nursery 100 (Las Vegas Dirt)
- First win: 2018 Star Nursery 100 (Las Vegas Dirt)
| Wins | Top tens | Poles |
|---|---|---|
| 1 | 3 | 0 |
Medal record
Representing United States
Summer X Games
| Gold medal – first place | 2015 Austin | Stadium Super Trucks |
| Silver medal – second place | 2014 Austin | Stadium Super Trucks |
- Statistics up to date as of November 7, 2026.

Sheldon Michael Creed (born September 30, 1997) is an American professional stock car racing driver. He competes full-time in the NASCAR O'Reilly Auto Parts Series, driving the No. 26 Toyota GR Supra for Sam Hunt Racing.

Born in Alpine, California, Creed grew up competing in short course off-road racing, winning championships in the Lucas Oil Off Road Racing Series (LOORRS) and Stadium Super Trucks (SST). A two-time SST champion, he also has the most race wins in series history with 39. Creed moved to stock cars in 2016 with the ARCA Racing Series, and he would win its title in 2018. After making sporadic starts in various NASCAR series in 2017 and 2018, he became a full-time NASCAR Camping World Truck Series driver in 2019. He won the 2020 NASCAR Gander RV & Outdoors Truck Series Championship in his second full season.

Creed has also raced in Aussie Racing Cars, NASCAR Camping World Truck Series, NASCAR K&N Pro Series East and West, and Trans-Am Series, and has participated in rally raid events like the Baja 1000 and Dakar Rally. He is a two-time X Games medalist, winning a silver medal in 2014 and gold in 2015. Creed was nicknamed “Silver Creed” by commentator Rick Allen due to his many second-place finishes, and as of the 2025 Food City 300, he holds the record for most runner-up finishes in the O'Reilly Auto Parts Series before his first win at fifteen. After four years of running full-time in the series, Creed claimed his first three O'Reilly Series victories in 2026 at Atlanta Motor Speedway, Darlington Raceway, and Bristol.

== Early career ==
Creed began riding BMX bikes when he was three years old, winning a state championship two years later. He later switched to motocross and won two Barona MX Park championships in 2005. That year, he was also invited to KTM's Jr Supercross Challenge, in which he finished second. Due to his mother's concerns about potential injury, Creed moved away from motocross.

When he was eight, Creed competed in Quarter Midget racing in the Orange Show Quarter Midget Racing Association and set various track records. His dirt track racing experience also included sprint cars beginning in 2011.

== Off-road racing ==
At the age of nine, Creed began racing Trophy Karts in Championship Off-Road Racing (CORR), where he finished fourth in his first year. In 2008, he won the M4SX and JR 1 Kart championships, followed by the SXS Stadium Series' Stadium Kart JR 1 title a year later. His 2009 season also included a third-place points finish in the SXS Stadium Kart Modified standings.

=== Lucas Oil Off Road Racing Series ===
From 2009 to 2011, Creed won a championship in every year of Lucas Oil Off Road Racing Series (LOORRS) kart competition. In 2009, he won the Junior 1 Kart and Modified Kart titles to become the series' third driver to win multiple class championships in the same year. The following year, he won the Junior 2 Karts. In 2011, Creed won a pair of Lucas Oil Regional championships in the Modified Karts and SuperLite Southern California divisions. In September, he made his SuperLite national debut at Speedworld Offroad Park, where he recorded a runner-up finish in the weekend's second race. Three months later, he won his first national race at Las Vegas Motor Speedway.

In 2012, he ran the full SuperLite and Modified Kart national schedules. While he finished fifth in the latter's standings with no wins, he won seven SuperLite races to clinch that series' championship. Creed also won the season-ending Lucas Oil Challenge Cup at Firebird International Raceway. In addition to running its regional counterpart, he competed in eight races in the Pro Lite national class. At the regional level, he won the Modified Kart title and finished runner-up in the Adult Kart standings.

Creed ran his first full Pro Lite season in 2013 with support from former LOORRS race director Tony Vanilo. Despite being second in the standings entering the final stop at Lake Elsinore Motorsports Park, he started at the back after crashing in qualifying. During the race, he was hit from behind after stopping his truck for a red flag, forcing his team to make repairs; after rejoining the race, he finished sixth. Creed ended the season with a third-place points finish, 29 points behind champion Brian Deegan, with wins at Lake Elsinore, Miller Motorsports Park, and Wild West Motorsports Park. He also joined the Traxxas TORC Series in September at Primm Off Road Raceway, where he finished first and fifth in the two Pro Light races.

The 2014 Pro Lite season began with six consecutive podium finishes, including a win at Wild Horse Pass Motorsports Park after holding off Justin Smith, while the second victory came at Miller in June. Despite the strong start, Creed did not win again for the rest of the year as he "had some rough races in the middle (of the season)", while main championship rival Deegan won twice. Entering the final weekend at Lake Elsinore, Creed held a fourteen-point advantage over Deegan. Although Creed finished behind Deegan in the Friday event to narrow the margin to six points, a podium finish in the Saturday event enabled him to win the championship by four points. At the age of sixteen, he was the youngest Pro Lite champion.

Creed continued to race Pro Lites in 2015, running ten races with four second-place finishes. In August, he substituted for the injured Brad DeBerti in the No. 70 at Wild West Motorsports Park; Creed went on to win the first race after taking the lead early, and DeBerti was credited with the victory in the standings. Creed also debuted in the Pro 2 division, finishing third at Miller and Wild West as he finished 11th in points.

=== Stadium Super Trucks ===
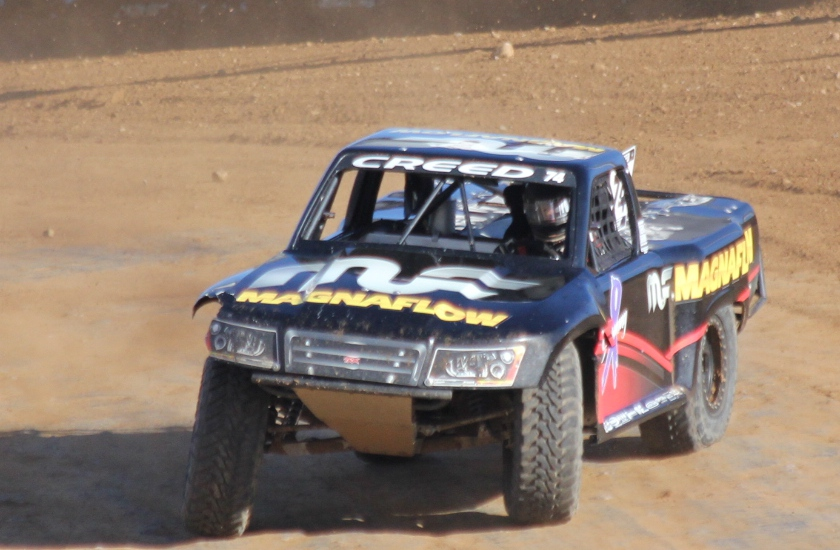
Creed's Stadium Super Truck at Crandon International Off-Road Raceway in 2013

On May 4, 2013, Creed joined the Stadium Super Trucks at Qualcomm Stadium in San Diego. After being the third-fastest driver in qualifying and finishing second in the Last Chance Qualifier race, Creed exited the final race after completing seven of twenty laps and finished tenth. When the series returned to Qualcomm Stadium two weeks later, he set the fastest lap time in qualifying before finishing second in the final to Robby Gordon. Gordon, the SST founder and a former NASCAR driver, would become Creed's mentor as he moved into stock cars. At Honda Indy Toronto in July, Creed took the lead from P. J. Jones on lap three after the two collided and spun out, though they were far enough from the other drivers to keep their positions; while the damage forced Jones to make a pit stop for repairs, Creed remained on the track and led the final six laps to win his first SST race. At the age of 15, he was the series' youngest race winner. A second victory came at the Sand Sports Super Show in September; after skipping the weekend's first two races to race in the LOORRS Pro Lites, Creed dominated the third and final round. Creed ended the 2013 season with two wins and five podium finishes in nine races.

Creed ran the full 2014 schedule, scoring three wins and nine podium finishes. He claimed the silver medal at X Games Austin behind Apdaly Lopez to become the youngest auto racer to win an X Games medal. In July, he swept the Toronto weekend. Creed won again in the final race of the year at MGM Resorts Village, but finished second in the championship behind Gordon by 75 points.

The 2015 season began in Adelaide, where Creed won the second race after holding off four other drivers. In the weekend's final race, he finished in third while landing sideways and rolling across the finish line before flipping back on his wheels. His second win of the year came in the Grand Prix of St. Petersburg after battling with E. J. Viso on the final lap. In June, he won the gold medal at X Games Austin 2015 after being the holeshot and led every lap. Creed battled with Gordon in the standings throughout the season, and he capitalized on Gordon's misfortunes in the Australian races and Las Vegas Village to win the championship. He ended the season with nine wins and thirteen podiums, the former of which also included victories at the Sand Sports Super Show (twice), Surfers Paradise Street Circuit (twice), Valvoline Raceway, and Las Vegas. After the season, Creed won two exhibition races at Homebush Street Circuit.

Creed opened 2016 with two wins at Adelaide. He went on to dominate the season as he won all but eight of the twenty races en route to his second consecutive title. Besides his Adelaide wins, other victories included St. Petersburg, weekend sweeps at the Grand Prix of Long Beach and the Charlotte Motor Speedway Dirt Track, the series' inaugural race at Townsville Street Circuit, the Sand Sports Super Show, and two of three races at Surfers Paradise. In October, he joined Gordon at the Mike's Peak Hill Climb Challenge in Baja California, a hillclimbing event that did not count for the championship. Creed finished with the second-fastest times on both days, trailing Gordon.

In 2017, he competed in fourteen races and recorded a series-best seven wins. Three of the wins came in Australia, beginning with the second Adelaide race. Creed also won two of three races at Barbagallo Raceway, winning the first after passing leader Bill Hynes and the second upon beating Gordon to the finish by .023 seconds. Additional victories came with a sweep of the Chevrolet Detroit Grand Prix and winning the second race at Texas Motor Speedway. In the two-day Race & Rock World Championships at Lake Elsinore Diamond to end the season, Creed won his heat race on both days, followed by finishing second in the Friday feature and winning Saturday's.

Upon switching to stock cars, Creed continued to race in SST whenever the opportunity is available. In 2018, he ran the Lake Elsinore season opener, during which he won his heat and finished sixth in the feature after being spun on lap two, and the year's final two races at Glen Helen Raceway, where he was marred by engine problems. The next season featured a six-race slate for Creed as he swept the Texas Motor Speedway weekend and won the Saturday race at Portland International Raceway. He participated in the 2020 weekend at Road America alongside Truck Series teammate Zane Smith, where he finished second and third. The 2021 Stadium Super Trucks-opening weekend at St. Petersburg saw him win both races.

As of June 7, 2021, he has 39 career wins, the most of any driver in SST history. His two championships are the second most, tied with Gordon and trailing Matthew Brabham by one.

=== Rally raid and desert racing ===
In 2016, Creed competed in the Dakar Rally in a Robby Gordon-owned Gordini with Dakar motorcyclist Jonah Street as his navigator. At the age of eighteen, he was the youngest driver to compete in the event. Across the first seven stages, his best finish was 26th in the fourth. However, in the eighth, clutch issues and the impending time limit prompted him to skip waypoints due to the time limit and resulted in his disqualification.

Creed entered the 2016 SCORE International Baja 1000 as the driver of the No. 2974 Arctic Cat UTV alongside Todd Romano and Gordon, which competed in the UTV Pro Forced Induction class, as well as the co-driver of the No. 2933 UTV with Romano and Gordon. However, both cars failed to finish. He returned to the race a year later with the same teammates in addition to Gordon's nine-year-old son Max, who was not listed on the entry list and not allowed to compete under SCORE's rules that mandate a minimum age of eighteen. Mechanical troubles plagued Creed's stint before Max took over and completed the distance, though the younger Gordon's ineligibility meant the entry was officially classified as a retirement.

== Stock car racing ==
=== Regional series and ARCA ===
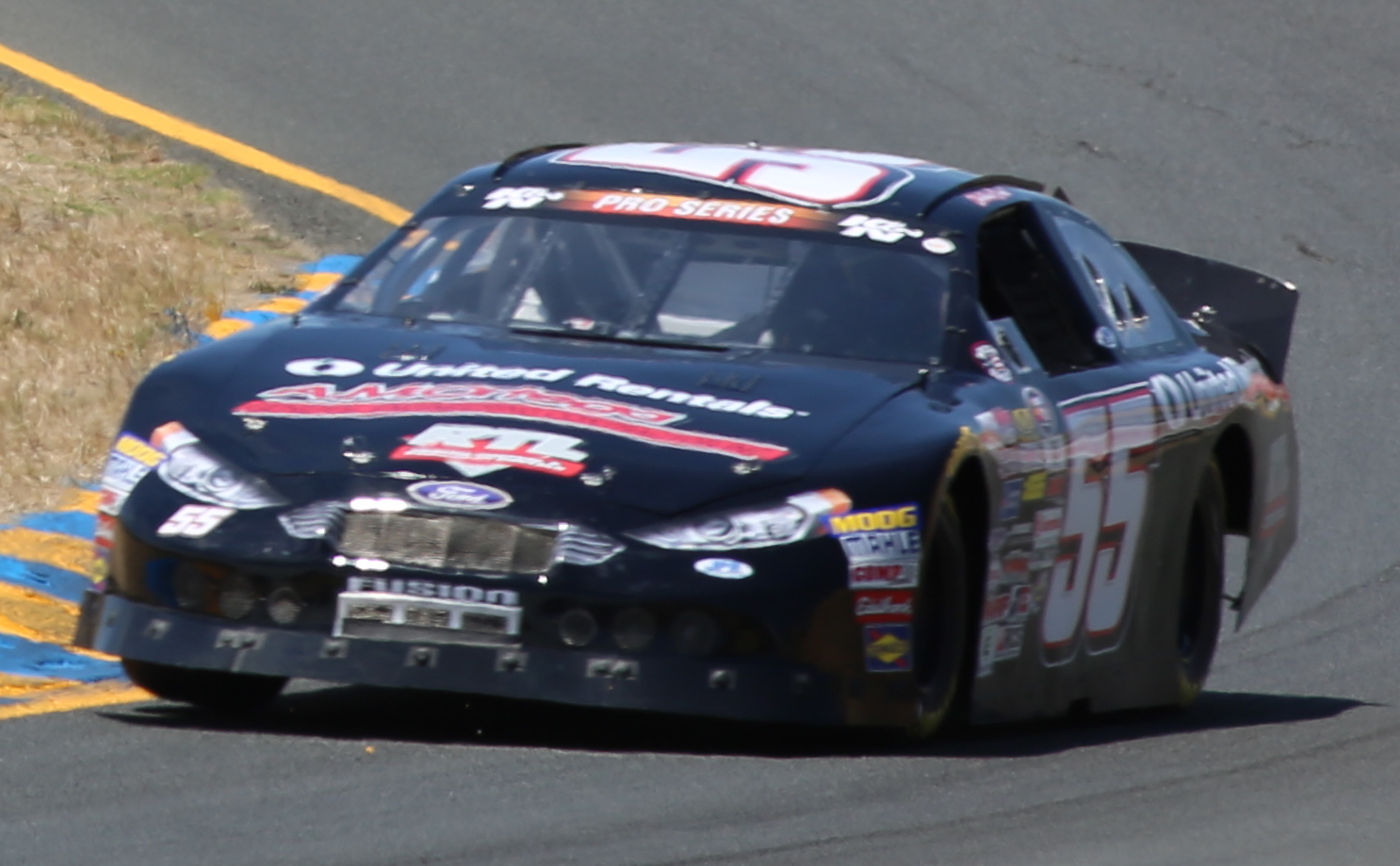
Creed's K&N Pro Series West car at Sonoma Raceway in 2017

After enjoying success in SST and off-road racing, Creed began running stock cars. In 2014 and 2015, he competed in the World Series of Asphalt Pro Late Model championship at New Smyrna Speedway for TRI Driver Development, finishing third in the latter year's standings and recording four top-five finishes in thirteen total starts. He initially disliked the transition from the frenetic off-road racing to requiring more patience in stock cars, prompting a dormancy in competitive asphalt racing from 2016 to 2018.

In March 2016, he tested an ARCA Racing Series stock car for Lira Motorsports at the Nashville Fairgrounds Speedway. The team later announced he would compete in the series for the 2016 season, driving the No. 38 Ford. Creed finished seventh in his debut at Nashville, his only top-ten finish in a six-race slate for the team that year.

In 2017, Creed ran two races apiece in the NASCAR K&N Pro Series East and West. In the former, driving for MDM Motorsports, he debuted in the first race of the season at New Smyrna, where he started fourth and finished 19th, followed by starting second and finishing eleventh at Bristol Motor Speedway. He raced for Jefferson Pitts Racing in the Pro Series West at Orange Show Speedway, where he qualified sixth after being the fastest car in practice and finished second to Chris Eggleston, and Sonoma Raceway, where he finished ninth in a two-car effort for JPR alongside NASCAR Cup Series driver Kevin Harvick.

Creed's 2017 stock car schedule also included ARCA, which began with the Nashville race in April with MDM, where he finished sixth. He partnered with Mason Mitchell Motorsports for the dirt races at the Illinois and DuQuoin State Fairgrounds Racetracks, driving the No. 78 Chevrolet. In the former, he fell to eighth after being on the disadvantageous outside line but regained his lost momentum to finish fourth. At DuQuoin, he fought with Shane Lee for the win before contact between the two on the final restart led to Austin Theriault winning and Creed taking second. At Kentucky Speedway, Creed won the pole position and finished third after hitting the wall on the last lap while attempting to pass Theriault for the lead. Creed led a race-high 52 laps in the season finale at Kansas Speedway, but tire damage resulted in a nineteenth place finish. In eleven races in 2017, nine of which were with MDM, he recorded five top-five finishes and eight Top 10's.

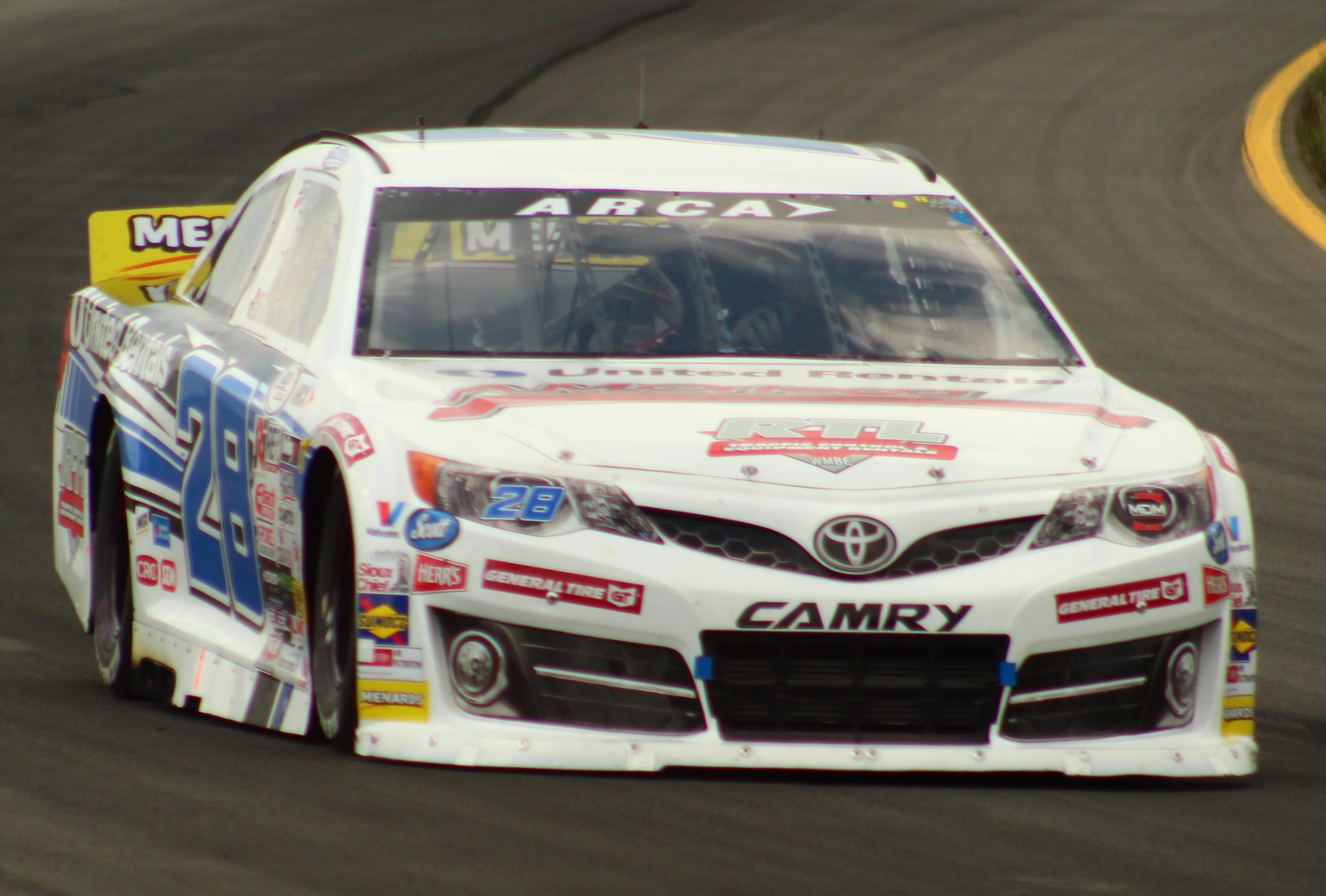
Creed during his 2018 ARCA championship season at Pocono Raceway

Creed competed full-time in ARCA in 2018 with MDM, driving the No. 28. He began the season with top-five finishes in all but one of the first seven races. In June, Creed scored his first series win at Michigan International Speedway after outlasting Riley Herbst and Quin Houff. Further victories were claimed at Gateway Motorsports Park, where he started from the pole, and Iowa Speedway, where he held off Chandler Smith. A fourth win came in the season finale at Kansas as he clinched the ARCA championship with 16 Top 5's in 20 races. While his four wins were tied with championship runner-up Zane Smith for the most in 2018, Creed led the series in top-fives and top-tens (eighteen), and he won the title by 460 points. He also won the Sioux Chief Short Track Challenge, a championship for ARCA races on tracks shorter than one mile, by 35 points over Smith. On April 25, 2019, Creed was inducted into the International Motorsports Hall of Fame's ARCA Wall of Champions.

In September 2018, Creed won the K&N Pro Series West's Star Nursery 100 on Las Vegas Motor Speedway's dirt track; it was the series' first dirt race since 1979. After starting sixth, Creed claimed the lead following a penalty to leader Christopher Bell, and he held off fellow off-road racer Hailie Deegan for the win.

Creed returned to ARCA in 2019 at Charlotte Motor Speedway with GMS Racing, finishing second after rebounding from a late speeding penalty. He also ran the final race of the season at Kansas for KBR Development and finished eleventh.

=== NASCAR Craftsman Truck Series ===
In 2016, Creed made his NASCAR Craftsman Truck Series debut in the Eldora Dirt Derby at Eldora Speedway, driving the No. 07 Chevrolet Silverado for SS-Green Light Racing. After finishing fifth in his heat race, he started 25th in the feature and finished sixteenth, two laps behind race winner Kyle Larson. He returned to the Dirt Derby in 2017 in the No. 20 Silverado for Young's Motorsports. A fourth-place finish in his heat placed him in 19th to begin the main race, but he finished 27th after contact with another truck led to a wreck and overheating issues.

Creed raced at Eldora for the third consecutive year in 2018, running the No. 99 for MDM; he finished second in the heat to start sixth in the Derby, which he finished in fifteenth. On September 25, GMS Racing announced Creed would run the season's remaining four Truck Series races. After his first two races at Martinsville Speedway and Texas, the team elevated him to a full-time campaign for 2019.

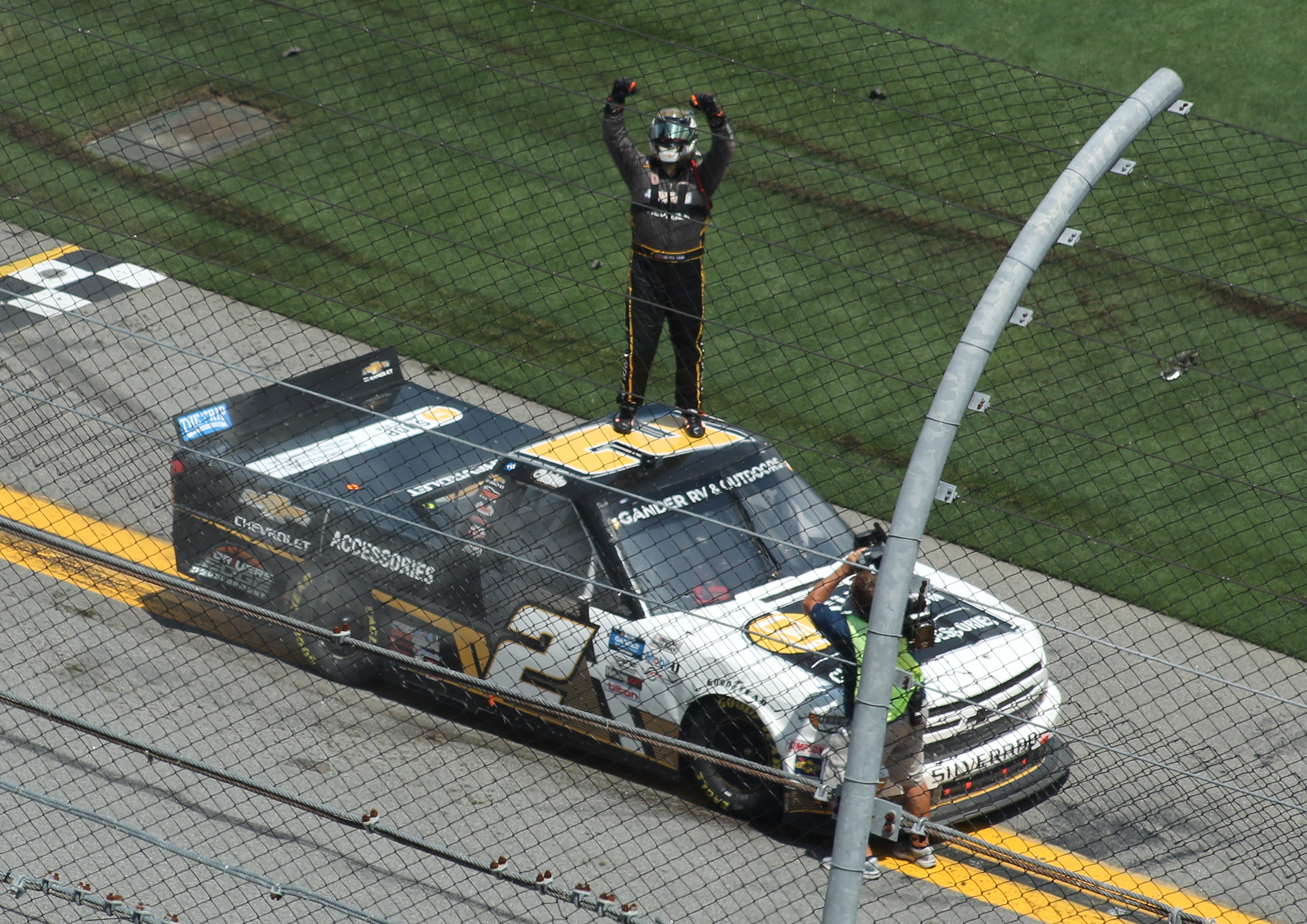
Creed celebrating after winning the 2020 Sunoco 159

Before the 2019 NASCAR Gander Outdoors Truck Series season, GMS and JR Motorsports formed Drivers Edge Development, a Chevrolet-led driver development program with Creed as one of its members. In the season-opening NextEra Energy 250 at Daytona, Creed won the opening stage but was collected in a multi-driver wreck on lap 99. In late July, Creed's crew chief Doug Randolph was replaced by Jeff Stankiewicz, who worked with Creed during his 2018 ARCA championship season. Although Creed recorded two second-place finishes at Eldora and Michigan, he missed the Truck Series playoffs as he required a win to qualify. Creed ended the 2019 season with a tenth-place points finish with four top-fives and eleven top-tens. Despite showing competitive race paces during his rookie campaign, he struggled with consistency and controlling his aggressive driving style, the latter of which Creed noted was effective in ARCA but unsustainable in NASCAR.

He returned to the GMS No. 2 for 2020. Creed enjoyed a strong start to the season by finishing ninth in the opener at Daytona and battling with eventual winner Kyle Busch for the lead at Las Vegas before finishing tenth. In July, he scored his first Truck victory in the lightning-shortened race at Kentucky. Two more wins came in August on the Daytona road course, where he held off GMS teammate Brett Moffitt on the final restart with two laps remaining, and at Gateway after passing fellow GMS driver Sam Mayer on a late restart and leading the final thirteen laps. He entered the playoffs as the top-seeded driver with three wins, five stage wins, and a fifth-place regular season points finish. A victory at Texas in the penultimate round clinched him spot in the championship round. The final race at Phoenix Raceway saw him pit prior to overtime and fall from third to ninth, but a strong restart propelled him to the lead and ultimately the championship. His five wins led the series in 2020.

Creed remained in the No. 2 for the 2021 NASCAR Camping World Truck Series. In the second race at the Daytona road course, he led a race-high 17 laps but committed errors throughout the night such as colliding with the lapped Bobby Reuse while leading and falling from first to fifth in the final stage after trying to conserve fuel; Creed also collided with Ben Rhodes, who made the race-winning overtake with seven laps remaining. At Darlington Raceway, crashes in the last stage eliminated the leaders and Creed took the lead on the final restart, preventing Rhodes from passing him as he won his first race of the season. The inaugural Corn Belt 150 at Knoxville Raceway saw Creed struggle midway before climbing to sixth with ten laps remaining before he was collected in a multi-driver accident. He was critical of the race in his media interview, arguing NASCAR improperly prepared the dirt track, which resulted in a single racing line along the bottom that provided for poor racing, and that the Truck Series should instead be racing at Iowa Speedway; he also suggested modifications to the trucks to resemble off-road vehicles such as removing the windshield and moving the radiator to the rear. Creed entered the playoffs as the fifth seed and won the first two races at Gateway and Darlington. A crash at Las Vegas dropped Creed outside of the top four in points that would advance to the Championship Round. Although he finished ninth in the Round of 8's elimination race at Martinsville, he was four points short of making the final round.

Although Creed moved up to the Xfinity Series in 2022, he returned to the Trucks at Circuit of the Americas in the No. 20 for Young's. He won the pole, his first in the series, despite a fuel pump issue that caused it to sputter during practice. Creed started the race at the rear after changing the pump but retired with a drivetrain problem upon completing a lap. He was the third driver in Truck Series history to win a pole but finish last after Rich Bickle at Colorado National Speedway in 1996 and David Reutimann at Homestead–Miami Speedway in 2005.

=== NASCAR O'Reilly Auto Parts Series ===
==== Part-time with multiple teams (2017, 2019, 2021) ====
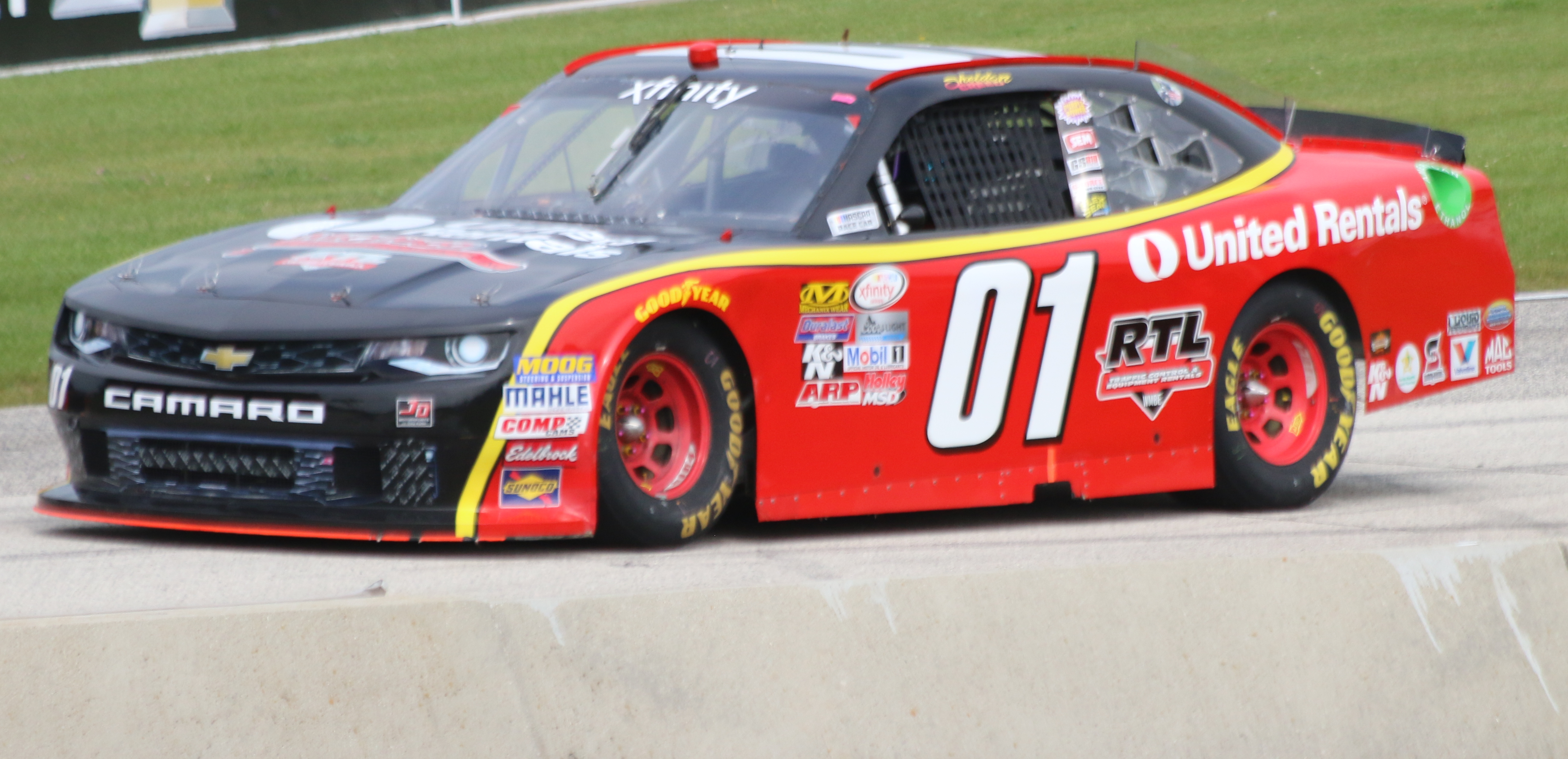
Creed in his 2017 Xfinity Series car at Road America

In 2017, Creed ran the NASCAR Xfinity Series races at Mid-Ohio Sports Car Course and Road America, driving the No. 01 Chevrolet for JD Motorsports. He chose to compete in the road course events as he felt he needed more experience on such tracks in cars, and that when one received an "opportunity with a big-time ride, you want to be ready."

Mechanical issues plagued Creed's Xfinity debut at Mid-Ohio, with a jammed gearbox in practice causing him to qualify 32nd and visit the garage for repairs during the race; when he returned to the track, he was 16 laps behind the leaders. Although the car's performance improved, further problems later in the event resulted in him finishing 34th and 19 laps down. At Road America, Creed started last after missing driver introductions but finished tenth in the first stage for the No. 01 car's first stage points of the year. Although he ran in the top-fifteenfor much of the second stage, a transmission problem forced him to retire from the race after eighteen laps and finish 38th.

He returned to the series in 2019, driving the No. 8 for JR Motorsports at the July Daytona race. He qualified ninth but finished 34th after being involved in a lap 71 crash that took out multiple drivers.

==== Full-time with Richard Childress Racing (2022–2023) ====
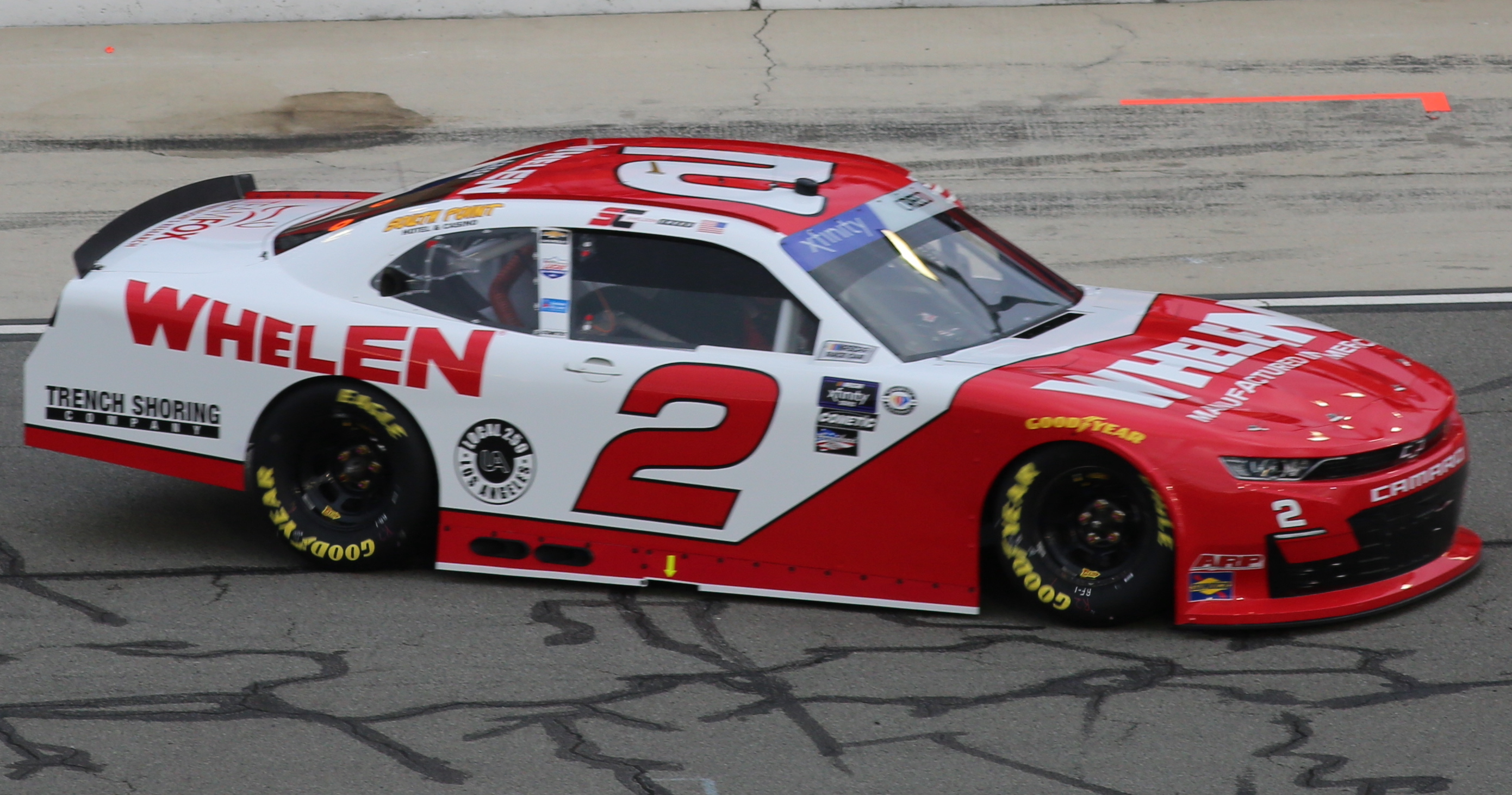
Creed at Auto Club Speedway in 2023

On September 14, 2021, Richard Childress Racing announced Creed would move up to the Xfinity Series on a full-time schedule in 2022. In preparation for his rookie season, Creed entered the 2021 season finale at Phoenix for B. J. McLeod Motorsports. At the September Darlington race, Creed scored a career-best second place after engaging in a three-car battle with race winner Noah Gragson and Kyle Larson on the closing laps. At Martinsville, Creed scored his second career runner up finish. Creed scored four top-fives and thirteen top-tens with an average finish of 17.5 and finished 14th in points with 9 DNFs.

Creed started the 2023 season with a 34th place DNF at Daytona. He won his first career pole in the Xfinity series at Portland, where he also led the most laps and ended up finishing seventh. Not winning a race, he stayed consistent enough to make the playoffs. On September 12, crew chief Jeff Stankiewicz was suspended for the Bristol playoff race and fined US$10,000 after the car was found to have two loose lug nuts following the Kansas race. On October 11, Creed announced he will not return to RCR in 2024. At Martinsville, Creed was in position for his first career win and a shot at competing for the championship as he was battling his teammate Austin Hill, who was also in position for the championship. On the final lap, Creed moved Hill in turns 1 and 2 and was side by side with him. Creed sent it in to turn 3 and overdrove the corner and ended up brake checking Hill in the process that caused Hill to wreck in turn 4 and gave the win to Justin Allgaier with Creed finishing 2nd. It would knock both Creed and Hill out of competing for the championship. Creed was criticized by both Hill and his owner, Richard Childress, with Hill saying about Creed moving on from RCR that he's "pretty excited." Overall, Creed scored 7 top fives and 15 top tens along with five runner up finishes, had an average finish of 13.5 and finished 7th in points.

==== Joe Gibbs Racing (2024) ====
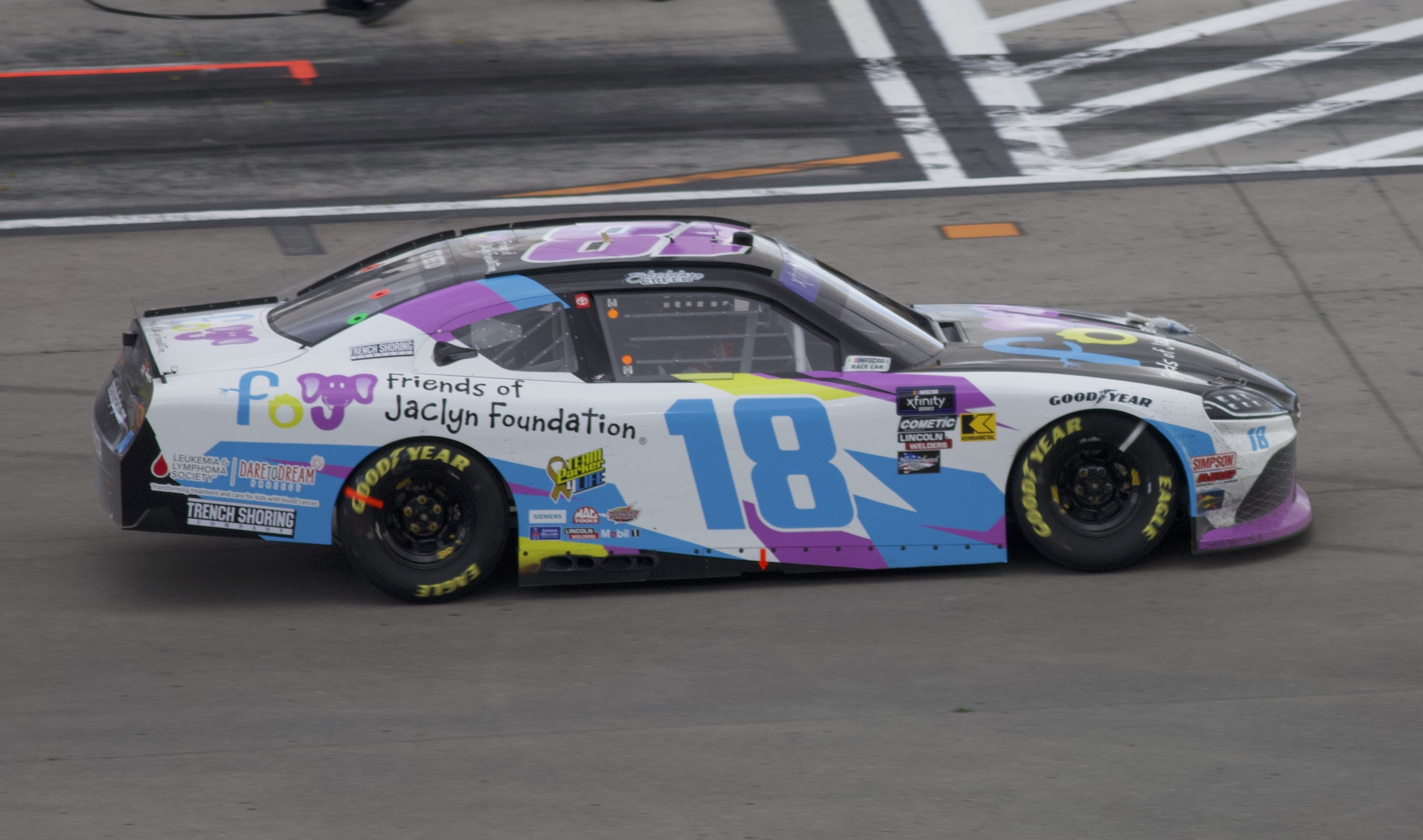
Creed's No. 18 car at Las Vegas Motor Speedway in 2024.

On December 13, 2023, it was announced that Creed would run the No. 18 Joe Gibbs Racing Toyota full-time. It marked the first time he had driven a Toyota in more than five years. At Michigan, Creed would finish 2nd to Justin Allgaier, his 11th in the series, breaking the record for the most 2nd-place finishes in the series without a win. Creed finished in the top-ten 23 times and scored sixteen top five finishes, including six runner-up finishes. Creed also scored two poles during the season and finished sixth in the final points standings.

==== Haas Factory Team (2025–2026) ====
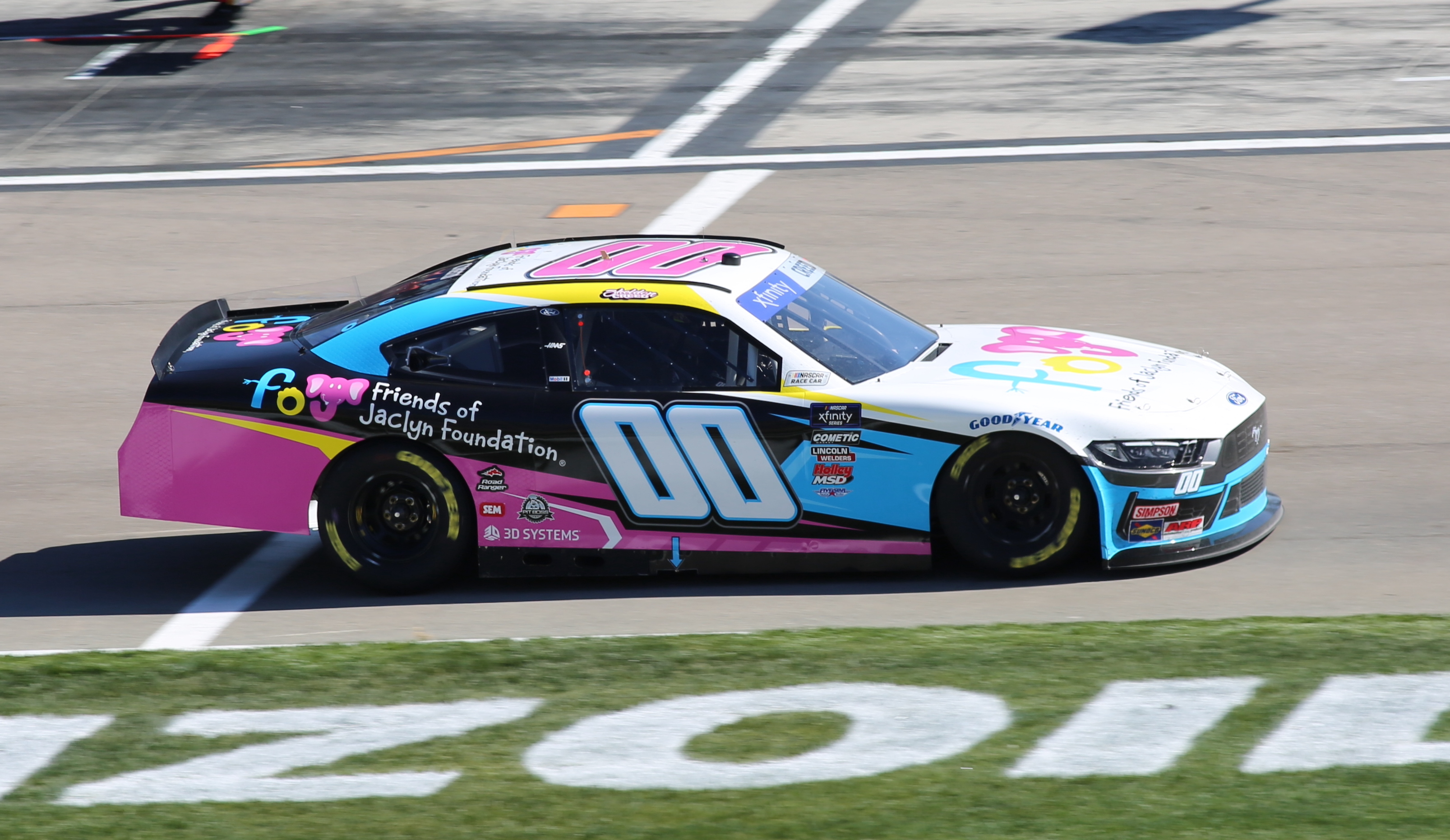
Creed's No. 00 car at Las Vegas Motor Speedway in 2025

On August 17, 2024, Creed signed with Haas Factory Team to drive the No. 00 Ford in 2025. Creed finished with 16 top-tens and eight top-fives, including two runner-up finishes, along with a pole and finishing 9th in the final points standings. This made 15 times Creed had finished runner-up before scoring his first win.

Creed kicked off the 2026 season with a 24th place at Daytona. After countless second-place finishes, Creed claimed his first O'Reilly Series win at Atlanta 1. During "The Chase", he won at Darlington and Bristol.

==== Sam Hunt Racing (2027–) ====
On October 3, 2026, it was announced that Creed would join Sam Hunt Racing to drive their No. 26 Toyota from 2027 onwards.

=== NASCAR Cup Series ===
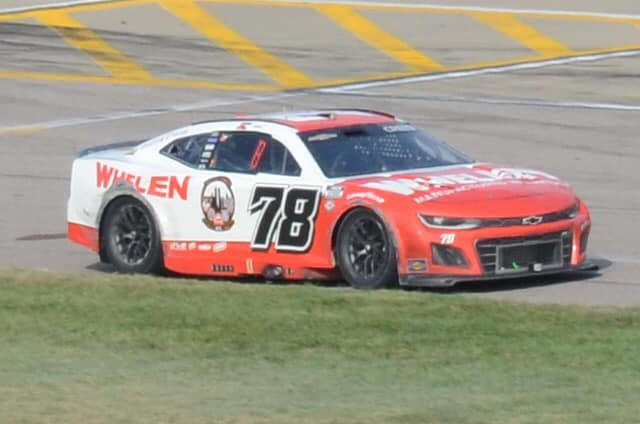
Sheldon Creed in the Live Fast Motorsports No. 78 Chevrolet at Kansas Speedway.

On July 12, 2023, it was announced that Creed would make his NASCAR Cup Series debut at Kansas in September in the No. 78 for Live Fast Motorsports. He started 34th in the 36-car field and finished the race two laps down in 29th.

== Other racing ==
In May 2017, while racing with the Stadium Super Trucks at Barbagallo Raceway in Perth, Creed participated in the Aussie Racing Cars support event. He raced the No. 57 car usually driven by fellow SST driver Bill Hynes as Hynes wished to focus on the trucks. Sharing the car with Robby Gordon, Creed finished ninth after starting last.

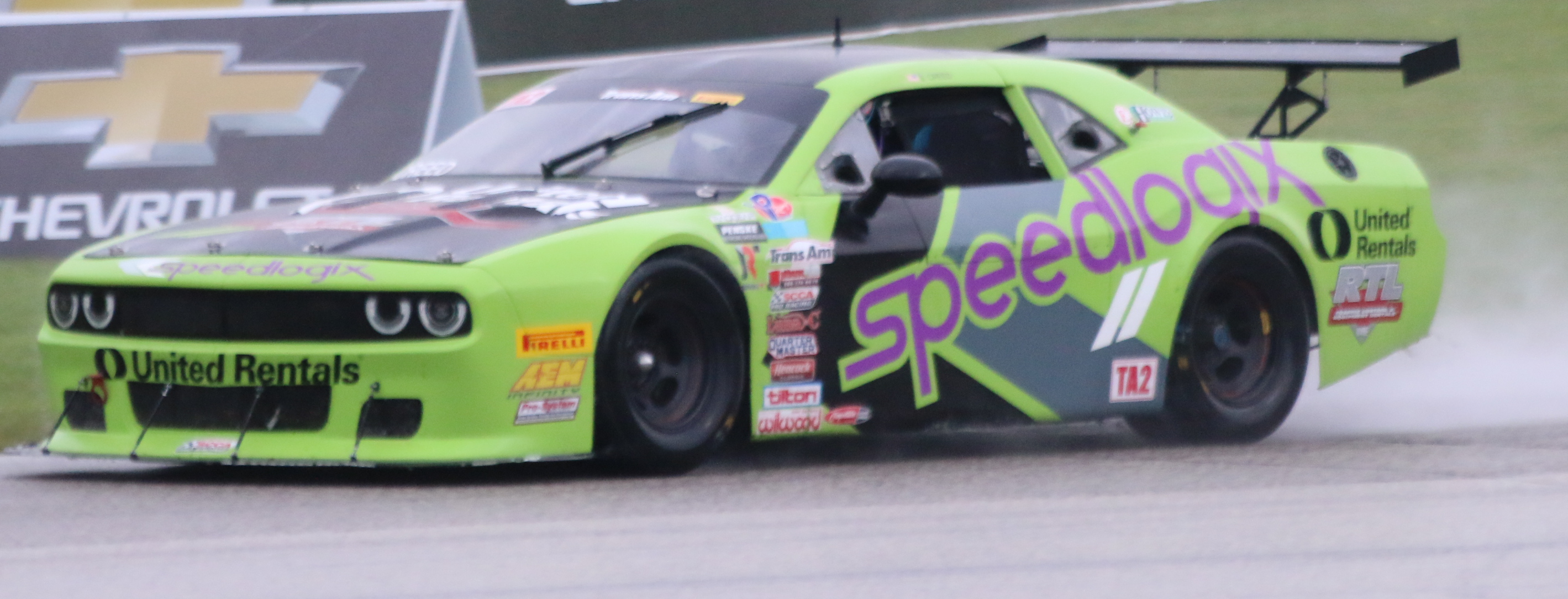
Creed in a 2017 Trans-Am TA2 race at Road America

Creed began running sports cars in 2017 when he joined the Trans-Am Series at Road Atlanta in May. He drove Stevens-Miller Racing's Dodge Challenger in the TA2 class as part of a four-race schedule, which included racing at Detroit, Mid-Ohio, and Road America. Although he had no prior experience at Road Atlanta and was unable to test the car due to other obligations, he prepared for the race using iRacing.com, in-car video from Stevens-Miller, and a virtual track system from Ross Bentley. At Road Atlanta, he finished tenth in his class, which he improved upon in Detroit with a fourth-place run. He recorded another top ten at Mid-Ohio (sixth) before scoring his first TA2 win at Road America; in rainy conditions, he passed race leader Tony Buffomante with five laps remaining. Creed attributed his success in such weather to his experience in off-road racing, as both require heavy throttle control.

In 2018, Creed returned to sprint cars when he finished third in the Tulsa Shootout's 1200cc Winged Mini Sprint division. The following year, he joined the POWRi Lucas Oil California Lightning Sprint Car Series at Barona and finished third. Creed purchased a micro sprint car in 2020 to race at Millbridge Speedway.

After Creed and Stewart Friesen finished second and first in the 2019 Eldora Dirt Derby, the two held a ten-lap one-on-one exhibition race at Orange County Fair Speedway in August as part of the track's centennial anniversary. Both drivers used their NASCAR trucks for the event, which was approved by NASCAR as the Truck Series calendar did not feature other dirt races, ensuring neither would have an advantage over other drivers for later races on such surfaces. Creed also entered the track's Big-Block Modified races during the weekend, but he was involved in a crash in his heat race on Friday, while he failed to qualify for the Saturday feature. When the 2020 NASCAR season was paused due to the COVID-19 pandemic, Creed participated in the NASCAR-sanctioned eNASCAR iRacing Pro Invitational Series' Saturday Night Thunder events for lower series drivers. After the season ended, he returned to the California Lightning Sprints for the final races of the year at Bakersfield Speedway and Placerville Speedway. Creed also raced in the Tulsa Shootout's Winged and Non-Wing Outlaw classes in December.

In August 2022, Creed made his USAC National Midget Series debut in the BC39 at Indianapolis Motor Speedway with Abacus Racing.

== Nicknames ==
He is nicknamed "the Showstopper", which he received from SST announcer Sean Sermini. During his early off-road career, he possessed the moniker "Prodigy of Short Course". Creed's fans have also dubbed him with their own nicknames, such as "Shelgoat", due to his car control and ability to recover from seemingly unavoidable spins. During qualifying at Atlanta Motor Speedway in 2024, Rick Allen gave Sheldon the nickname "Silver" to represent the amount of times he has finished second in the Xfinity series.

== Personal life ==
Creed was born in Alpine, California, with his family being heavily involved in racing. His father, Scott, who supported him throughout his early career, was a dirt bike rider, while his grandfather was a late model racer at Cajon Speedway. Grandfather Maurice Ortega runs the underground utility construction company A.M. Ortega and has sponsored Creed's off-road and NASCAR trucks. Ortega's grandson and Creed's cousin Bronsen Chiaramonte, also an off-road racer, was the LOORRS Mod Kart Rookie of the Year in 2018.

Among Creed's idols growing up were motocross stars Travis Pastrana and Jeremy McGrath. Seven-time NASCAR Cup champion Jimmie Johnson is a family friend of the Creeds; like Creed, Johnson was from San Diego County and began his racing career on dirt bikes at Barona, followed by success in off-road and stadium trucks as a teenager before moving to stock cars. In 2020, Johnson's final year as a full-time NASCAR driver, Creed ran a tribute paint scheme based on Johnson's trophy truck at Darlington Raceway.

Creed is married to Cami Parsons, the twin sister of Stefan Parsons. They are the parents of a son named Axel, who was born on June 11, 2022. He enjoys watching extreme sports and listening to country music such as Florida Georgia Line.

== Motorsports career results ==
=== Career summary ===
| Season | Series | Team | Races | Wins | Poles | Points | Position |
|---|---|---|---|---|---|---|---|
| 2013 | Stadium Super Trucks | Lofton Cattle, Traxxas | 9 | 2 | 1 | 215 | 5th |
| 2014 | Stadium Super Trucks | Traxxas | 14 | 3 | 0 | 417 | **2nd** |
| 2014 | World of Asphalt Stock Car Racing - Pro Late Model Division | TRI Driver Development | 6 | 0 | 0 | 213 | 17th |
| 2015 | Stadium Super Trucks | Traxxas | 19 | 9 | 2 | 617 | **1st** |
| 2015 | World of Asphalt Stock Car Racing - Pro Late Model Division | TRI Driver Development | 7 | 0 | 0 | 356 | **3rd** |
| 2016 | ARCA Racing Series | Lira Motorsports | 6 | 0 | 0 | 970 | 27th |
| 2016 | NASCAR Camping World Truck Series | SS-Green Light Racing | 1 | 0 | 0 | 18 | 58th |
| 2016 | Stadium Super Trucks | Traxxas | 19 | 9 | 2 | 617 | **1st** |
| 2017 | Arca Racing Series | MDM Motorsports | 8 | 0 | 1 | 2050 | 15th |
| 2017 | Arca Racing Series | Mason Mitchell Motorsports | 2 | 0 | 0 | 2050 | 15th |
| 2017 | Aussie Racing Cars | Hynes Racing | 1 | 0 | 0 | – | N/A |
| 2017 | NASCAR K&N Pro Series East | Jefferson Pitts Racing | 2 | 0 | 0 | 78 | 27th |
| 2017 | NASCAR K&N Pro Series West | MDM Motorsports | 4 | 2 | 0 | 138 | 17th |
| 2017 | NASCAR Camping World Truck Series | Young's Motorsports | 1 | 0 | 0 | 0^{1} | 102nd |
| 2017 | NASCAR Xfinity Series | JD Motorsports | 2 | 0 | 0 | 5 | 77th |
| 2017 | Stadium Super Trucks | Safecraft Safety Equipment | 14 | 7 | 0 | 411 | 5th |
| 2017 | Trans-Am - TA2 | Stevens-Miller Racing | 4 | 1 | 0 | 92 | 15th |
| 2018 | Arca Racing Series | MDM Motorsports | 20 | 4 | 4 | 5140 | **1st** |
| 2018 | California Lightning Sprint Car Series | Not Available | 1 | 0 | 0 | 116 | 49th |
| 2018 | NASCAR K&N Pro Series West | Norman-Levin Racing | 1 | 1 | 0 | 47 | 29th |
| 2018 | NASCAR Camping World Truck Series | MDM Motorsports | 1 | 0 | 0 | 123 | 33rd |
| 2018 | NASCAR Camping World Truck Series | GMS Racing | 4 | 0 | 0 | 123 | 33rd |
| 2018 | Stadium Super Trucks | United Fiber & Data | 3 | 0 | 1 | 62 | 13th |
| 2019 | Arca Racing Series | GMS Racing | 1 | 0 | 0 | 395 | 43rd |
| 2019 | Arca Racing Series | KBR Development | 1 | 0 | 0 | 395 | 43rd |
| 2019 | POWRi Lucas Oil California Lightning Sprint Car Series | Sexton Gatlin Racing | 1 | 0 | 0 | – | – |
| 2019 | NASCAR Gander Outdoors Truck Series | GMS Racing | 0 | 0 | 0 | 726 | 10th |
| 2019 | NASCAR Xfinity Series | JR Motorsports | 0 | 0 | 0 | 0^{1} | 103rd |
| 2019 | Stadium Super Trucks | Continental AG | 6 | 3 | 0 | 179 | 7th |
| 2020 | Bay Cities Racing Association Midget Lites | Not Available | 1 | 0 | 0 | – | – |
| 2020 | Brucebilt Performance Iron-Man Series | Not Available | 1 | 0 | 0 | – | – |
| 2020 | POWRi Lucas Oil California Lightning Sprint Car Series | Sexton Gatlin Racing | 1 | 0 | 0 | –^{2} | N/A^{2} |
| 2020 | Super DIRTcar Series | Not Available | 2 | 0 | 0 | 164 | 47th |
| 2020 | NASCAR Gander RV & Outdoors Truck Series | GMS Racing | 23 | 5 | 0 | 4040 | **1st** |
| 2020 | Stadium Super Trucks | Continental AG | 2 | 0 | 0 | –^{2} | N/A^{2} |
| 2021 | POWRi Minn-Kota Lightning Sprints | Not Available | 3 | 0 | 0 | – | – |
| 2021 | NASCAR Camping World Truck Series | GMS Racing | 22 | 3 | 0 | 2325 | 5th |
| 2021 | NASCAR Xfinity Series | B. J. McLeod Motorsports | 1 | 0 | 0 | 0^{1} | 88th |
| 2021 | Stadium Super Trucks | Continental AG | 4 | 3 | 0 | 116 | 5th |
| 2022 | NASCAR Camping World Truck Series | Young's Motorsports | 1 | 0 | 1 | 0^{1} | 106th |
| 2022 | NASCAR Xfinity Series | Richard Childress Racing | 33 | 0 | 0 | 751 | 14th |
| 2022 | POWRi 600cc Outlaw Micro League | Not Available | 2 | 0 | 0 | – | – |
| 2022 | USAC NOS Energy Drink Midget National Championship | Not Available | 0 | 0 | 0 | – | – |
| 2023 | Hyper Racing 600 Speedweek | Not Available | 3 | 0 | 0 | 259 | 14th |
| 2023 | NASCAR Cup Series | Live Fast Motorsports | 1 | 0 | 0 | 0^{1} | 60th |
| 2023 | NASCAR Xfinity Series | Richard Childress Racing | 33 | 0 | 1 | 2225 | 7th |
| 2023 | NOW600 National Micro Series Stock Non-Wing Division | Not Available | 2 | 0 | 0 | – | – |
| 2023 | NOW600 National Micro Series Winged A-Class Division | Not Available | 0 | 0 | 0 | – | – |
| 2023 | POWRi 600cc Outlaw Micro League | Not Available | 2 | 0 | 0 | – | – |
| 2024 | NASCAR Xfinity Series | Joe Gibbs Racing | 33 | 0 | 1 | 2264 | 6th |
| 2025 | NASCAR Xfinity Series | Haas Factory Team | 33 | 0 | 1 | 2218 | 9th |

^{1} Ineligible for series points. ^{2} Standings were not awarded by the series for the 2020 season. ^{*} Season in progress.

=== NASCAR ===
(key) (Bold – Pole position awarded by qualifying time. Italics – Pole position earned by points standings or practice time. * – Most laps led.)

==== Cup Series ====
NASCAR Cup Series results
| Year | Team | No. | Make | 1 | 2 | 3 | 4 | 5 | 6 | 7 | 8 | 9 | 10 | 11 | 12 | 13 | 14 | 15 | 16 | 17 | 18 | 19 | 20 | 21 | 22 | 23 | 24 | 25 | 26 | 27 | 28 | 29 | 30 | 31 | 32 | 33 | 34 | 35 | 36 | NCSC | Pts | Ref |
|---|---|---|---|---|---|---|---|---|---|---|---|---|---|---|---|---|---|---|---|---|---|---|---|---|---|---|---|---|---|---|---|---|---|---|---|---|---|---|---|---|---|---|
| 2023 | Live Fast Motorsports | 78 | Chevy | DAY | CAL | LVS | PHO | ATL | COA | RCH | BRD | MAR | TAL | DOV | KAN | DAR | CLT | GTW | SON | NSH | CSC | ATL | NHA | POC | RCH | MCH | IRC | GLN | DAY | DAR | KAN; 29 | BRI | TEX | TAL | ROV | LVS | HOM | MAR | PHO | 60th | 0^{1} | |

==== O'Reilly Auto Parts Series ====
NASCAR O'Reilly Auto Parts Series results
| Year | Team | No. | Make | 1 | 2 | 3 | 4 | 5 | 6 | 7 | 8 | 9 | 10 | 11 | 12 | 13 | 14 | 15 | 16 | 17 | 18 | 19 | 20 | 21 | 22 | 23 | 24 | 25 | 26 | 27 | 28 | 29 | 30 | 31 | 32 | 33 | NOAPSC | Pts | Ref |
|---|---|---|---|---|---|---|---|---|---|---|---|---|---|---|---|---|---|---|---|---|---|---|---|---|---|---|---|---|---|---|---|---|---|---|---|---|---|---|---|
| 2017 | JD Motorsports | 01 | Chevy | DAY | ATL | LVS | PHO | CAL | TEX | BRI | RCH | TAL | CLT | DOV | POC | MCH | IOW | DAY | KEN | NHA | IND | IOW | GLN | MOH; 34 | BRI | ROA; 38 | DAR | RCH | CHI | KEN | DOV | CLT | KAN | TEX | PHO | HOM | 77th | 5 | |
| 2019 | JR Motorsports | 8 | Chevy | DAY | ATL | LVS | PHO | CAL | TEX | BRI | RCH | TAL | DOV | CLT | POC | MCH | IOW | CHI | DAY; 34 | KEN | NHA | IOW | GLN | MOH | BRI | ROA | DAR | IND | LVS | RCH | ROV | DOV | KAN | TEX | PHO | HOM | 103rd | 0^{1} | |
| 2021 | B. J. McLeod Motorsports | 78 | Chevy | DAY | DRC | HOM | LVS | PHO | ATL | MAR | TAL | DAR | DOV | COA | CLT | MOH | TEX | NSH | POC | ROA | ATL | NHA | GLN | IRC | MCH | DAY | DAR | RCH | BRI | LVS | TAL | ROV | TEX | KAN | MAR | PHO; 10 | 88th | 0^{1} | |
| 2022 | Richard Childress Racing | 2 | Chevy | DAY; 6 | CAL; 32 | LVS; 7 | PHO; 14 | ATL; 9 | COA; 10 | RCH; 22 | MAR; 30 | TAL; 24 | DOV; 8 | DAR; 38 | TEX; 26 | CLT; 8 | PIR; 32 | NSH; 36 | ROA; 27 | ATL; 12 | NHA; 5 | POC; 5 | IRC; 23 | MCH; 11 | GLN; 8 | DAY; 36 | DAR; 2 | KAN; 11 | BRI; 37 | TEX; 7 | TAL; 12 | ROV; 16 | LVS; 37 | HOM; 17 | MAR; 2 | PHO; 6 | 14th | 751 | |
| 2023 | Richard Childress Racing | 2 | Chevy | DAY; 34 | CAL; 23 | LVS; 9 | PHO; 3 | ATL; 21 | COA; 9 | RCH; 6 | MAR; 27 | TAL; 2 | DOV; 11 | DAR; 25 | CLT; 28 | **PIR**; 7* | SON; 11 | NSH; 17 | CSC; 11 | ATL; 35 | NHA; 21 | POC; 11 | ROA; 26 | MCH; 12 | IRC; 8 | GLN; 2 | DAY; 2 | DAR; 8 | KAN; 3 | BRI; 11 | TEX; 8 | ROV; 10 | LVS; 15 | HOM; 26 | MAR; 2 | PHO; 2 | 7th | 2225 | |
| 2024 | Joe Gibbs Racing | 18 | Toyota | DAY; 2 | ATL; 4 | LVS; 26 | PHO; 3 | COA; 32 | RCH; 35 | MAR; 6 | TEX; 19 | TAL; 6 | DOV; 4 | DAR; 9 | CLT; 36 | PIR; 13 | SON; 2 | IOW; 5 | NHA; 2 | NSH; 33 | CSC; 26 | **POC**; 4 | IND; 5 | **MCH**; 2 | DAY; 8 | DAR; 3 | ATL; 25 | GLN; 2 | BRI; 2 | KAN; 5 | TAL; 4 | ROV; 35 | LVS; 9 | HOM; 5 | MAR; 6 | PHO; 7 | 6th | 2264 | |
| 2025 | Haas Factory Team | 00 | Ford | DAY; 3 | ATL; 14 | COA; 12 | PHO; 36 | LVS; 10 | HOM; 5 | MAR; 2 | DAR; 10 | BRI; 37 | CAR; 35 | TAL; 9 | TEX; 36 | CLT; 10 | NSH; 4 | MXC; 11 | POC; 36 | **ATL**; 32 | CSC; 3 | SON; 10 | DOV; 8 | IND; 17 | IOW; 7 | GLN; 35 | DAY; 17 | PIR; 27 | GTW; 30 | BRI; 2 | KAN; 5 | ROV; 11 | LVS; 11 | TAL; 34 | MAR; 4 | PHO; 8 | 9th | 2218 | |
| 2026 | Haas Factory Team | 00 | Chevy | DAY; 24 | ATL; 1 | COA; 11 | PHO; 4 | LVS; 3 | DAR; 7 | MAR; 4 | CAR; 6 | BRI; 6 | KAN; 2 | TAL; 3 | TEX; 6 | GLN; 29 | DOV; 18 | CLT; 32 | NSH; 15 | POC; 5 | COR; 3 | SON; 10 | CHI; 16 | ATL; 25 | **IND**; 8 | IOW; 5 | DAY; 10 | DAR; 1 | GTW; 2 | BRI; 1 | LVS; 13 | CLT; 3 | PHO; 32 | TAL; 5 | MAR; 6 | **HOM**; 6* | 4th | 2444 | |

==== Camping World Truck Series ====
NASCAR Camping World Truck Series results
| Year | Team | No. | Make | 1 | 2 | 3 | 4 | 5 | 6 | 7 | 8 | 9 | 10 | 11 | 12 | 13 | 14 | 15 | 16 | 17 | 18 | 19 | 20 | 21 | 22 | 23 | NCWTC | Pts | Ref |
|---|---|---|---|---|---|---|---|---|---|---|---|---|---|---|---|---|---|---|---|---|---|---|---|---|---|---|---|---|---|
| 2016 | SS-Green Light Racing | 07 | Chevy | DAY | ATL | MAR | KAN | DOV | CLT | TEX | IOW | GTW | KEN | ELD; 16 | POC | BRI | MCH | MSP | CHI | NHA | LVS | TAL | MAR | TEX | PHO | HOM | 58th | 18 | |
| 2017 | Young's Motorsports | 20 | Chevy | DAY | ATL | MAR | KAN | CLT | DOV | TEX | GTW | IOW | KEN | ELD; 27 | POC | MCH | BRI | MSP | CHI | NHA | LVS | TAL | MAR | TEX | PHO | HOM | 102nd | 0^{1} | |
| 2018 | MDM Motorsports | 99 | Chevy | DAY | ATL | LVS | MAR | DOV | KAN | CLT | TEX | IOW | GTW | CHI | KEN | ELD; 15 | POC | MCH | BRI | MSP | LVS | TAL | | | | | 33rd | 123 | |
| 2018 | GMS Racing | 2 | Chevy | | | | | | | | | | | | | | | | | | | | MAR; 19 | TEX; 25 | PHO; 10 | HOM; 5 | 33rd | 123 | |
| 2019 | GMS Racing | 2 | Chevy | DAY; 17 | ATL; 12 | LVS; 6 | MAR; 17 | TEX; 22 | DOV; 27 | KAN; 19 | CLT; 12 | TEX; 6 | IOW; 6 | GTW; 7 | CHI; 11 | KEN; 21 | POC; 25 | ELD; 2 | MCH; 2 | BRI; 6 | MSP; 4 | LVS; 4 | TAL; 9 | MAR; 11 | PHO; 12 | HOM; 9 | 10th | 726 | |
| 2020 | GMS Racing | 2 | Chevy | DAY; 9 | LVS; 10 | CLT; 5 | ATL; 14 | HOM; 20 | POC; 3* | KEN; 1 | TEX; 16 | KAN; 8 | KAN; 26 | MCH; 30 | DRC; 1* | DOV; 22 | GTW; 1 | DAR; 18* | RCH; 13 | BRI; 11 | LVS; 2* | TAL; 12 | KAN; 2* | TEX; 1* | MAR; 8* | PHO; 1 | 1st | 4040 | |
| 2021 | GMS Racing | 2 | Chevy | DAY; 6 | DRC; 2* | LVS; 18 | ATL; 5 | BRD; 16 | RCH; 11 | KAN; 32 | DAR; 1 | COA; 5* | CLT; 35 | TEX; 35 | NSH; 14 | POC; 3 | KNX; 35 | GLN; 3 | GTW; 1* | DAR; 1* | BRI; 19* | LVS; 36 | TAL; 12 | MAR; 9 | PHO; 4 | | 5th | 2325 | |
| 2022 | Young's Motorsports | 20 | Chevy | DAY | LVS | ATL | **COA**; 36 | MAR | BRD | DAR | KAN | TEX | CLT | GTW | SON | KNX | NSH | MOH | POC | IRP | RCH | KAN | BRI | TAL | HOM | PHO | 106th | 0^{1} | |

^{*} Season still in progress
^{1} Ineligible for series points

=== ARCA Menards Series ===
(key) (Bold – Pole position awarded by qualifying time. Italics – Pole position earned by points standings or practice time. * – Most laps led.)

ARCA Menards Series results
| Year | Team | No. | Make | 1 | 2 | 3 | 4 | 5 | 6 | 7 | 8 | 9 | 10 | 11 | 12 | 13 | 14 | 15 | 16 | 17 | 18 | 19 | 20 | AMSC | Pts | Ref |
|---|---|---|---|---|---|---|---|---|---|---|---|---|---|---|---|---|---|---|---|---|---|---|---|---|---|---|
| 2016 | Lira Motorsports | 38 | Ford | DAY | NSH; 7 | SLM; 20 | TAL; 14 | TOL; 13 | NJE; 11 | POC | MCH; 18 | MAD | WIN | IOW | IRP | POC | BLN | ISF | DSF | SLM | CHI | KEN | KAN | 27th | 970 | |
| 2017 | MDM Motorsports | 28 | Toyota | DAY | NSH; 6 | SLM | TAL | TOL | ELK | | MCH; 17 | MAD | | | | | | | | | CHI; 31 | **KEN**; 3 | | 15th | 2050 | |
| 2017 | MDM Motorsports | 12 | Toyota | | | | | | | POC; 8 | | | IOW; 3 | IRP; 5 | POC | WIN | | | | | | | KAN; 19 | 15th | 2050 | |
| 2017 | Mason Mitchell Motorsports | 78 | Chevy | | | | | | | | | | | | | | ISF; 4 | ROA | DSF; 2 | SLM | | | | 15th | 2050 | |
| 2018 | MDM Motorsports | 28 | Toyota | DAY; 3* | NSH; 2 | SLM; 3 | TAL; 4* | TOL; 18 | CLT; 3 | POC; 2 | MCH; 1 | MAD; 3 | **GTW**; 1* | CHI; 2 | **IOW**; 1* | ELK; 15 | POC; 2 | ISF; 2 | BLN; 6* | **DSF**; 10* | SLM; 4 | IRP; 2 | KAN; 1 | 1st | 5140 | |
| 2019 | GMS Racing | 21 | Chevy | DAY | FIF | SLM | TAL | NSH | TOL | CLT; 2 | POC | MCH | MAD | GTW | CHI | ELK | IOW | POC | ISF | DSF | SLM | IRP | | 43rd | 395 | |
| 2019 | KBR Development | 28 | Chevy | | | | | | | | | | | | | | | | | | | | KAN; 11 | 43rd | 395 | |

==== K&N Pro Series East ====
NASCAR K&N Pro Series East results
| Year | Team | No. | Make | 1 | 2 | 3 | 4 | 5 | 6 | 7 | 8 | 9 | 10 | 11 | 12 | 13 | 14 | NKNPSEC | Pts | Ref |
|---|---|---|---|---|---|---|---|---|---|---|---|---|---|---|---|---|---|---|---|---|
| 2017 | MDM Motorsports | 40 | Toyota | NSM; 19 | GRE | BRI; 11 | SBO | SBO | MEM | BLN | TMP | NHA; 5 | IOW | GLN | LGY | NJM | DOV; 4 | 17th | 138 | |

==== K&N Pro Series West ====
NASCAR K&N Pro Series West results
| Year | Team | No. | Make | 1 | 2 | 3 | 4 | 5 | 6 | 7 | 8 | 9 | 10 | 11 | 12 | 13 | 14 | NKNPSWC | Pts | Ref |
|---|---|---|---|---|---|---|---|---|---|---|---|---|---|---|---|---|---|---|---|---|
| 2017 | Jefferson Pitts Racing | 27 | Ford | TUS | KCR | IRW | IRW | SPO | OSS; 2 | CNS | | | | | | | | 27th | 78 | |
| 2017 | Jefferson Pitts Racing | 55 | Ford | | | | | | | | SON; 9 | IOW | EVG | DCS | MER | AAS | KCR | 27th | 78 | |
| 2018 | Norman-Levin Racing | 40 | Chevy | KCR | TUS | TUS | OSS | CNS | SON | DCS | IOW | EVG | GTW | LVS; 1 | MER | AAS | KCR | 29th | 47 | |

=== Stadium Super Trucks ===
(key) (Bold – Pole position. Italics – Fastest qualifier. * – Most laps led.)

Stadium Super Trucks results
| Year | 1 | 2 | 3 | 4 | 5 | 6 | 7 | 8 | 9 | 10 | 11 | 12 | 13 | 14 | 15 | 16 | 17 | 18 | 19 | 20 | 21 | 22 | SSTC | Pts | Ref |
|---|---|---|---|---|---|---|---|---|---|---|---|---|---|---|---|---|---|---|---|---|---|---|---|---|---|
| 2013 | PHO | LBH | LAN | SDG; 10 | SDG; 2 | STL; 8 | TOR; 3 | TOR; 1* | **CRA**; 8 | CRA; 2 | OCF | OCF | OCF; 1* | CPL; 7 | | | | | | | | | 5th | 215 | |
| 2014 | STP; 9 | STP; 5 | LBH; 3 | IMS; 8 | IMS; 3 | DET; 7^{†} | DET; 6^{†} | DET; 8^{†} | AUS; 2 | TOR; 1 | TOR; 1 | OCF; Rpl^{†} | OCF; Rpl^{†} | CSS; 2 | LVV; 4 | LVV; 1 | | | | | | | 2nd | 417 | |
| 2015 | ADE; 5 | ADE; 1* | ADE; 3 | STP; 1 | STP; 4 | LBH; 2 | DET; Rpl^{‡} | DET; Rpl^{‡} | DET; Rpl^{‡} | **AUS**; 1* | TOR; 2 | TOR; 2 | OCF; 8 | **OCF**; 1* | OCF; 1* | SRF; 9 | SRF; 1* | SRF; 1 | SRF; 5 | SYD; 1* | LVV; 10 | **LVV**; 1* | 1st | 617 | |
| 2016 | ADE; 1 | ADE; 4 | ADE; 1* | STP; 1* | STP; 2 | LBH; 1 | LBH; 1 | DET; 7 | DET; C^{1} | DET | TOW; 1 | TOW; 2 | TOW; 4 | TOR; 2 | TOR; 1* | CLT; 1* | CLT; 1* | OCF; 8 | OCF; 1* | SRF; 1* | SRF; 6 | SRF; 1* | 1st | 645 | |
| 2017 | ADE; 7 | ADE; 1 | ADE; 5 | STP; 2 | STP; 2 | LBH | LBH | PER; 1 | PER; 5 | PER; 1 | DET; 1* | DET; 1* | TEX; 9 | TEX; 1* | HID | HID | HID | BEI | GLN | GLN | ELS; 2 | ELS; 1* | 5th | 411 | |
| 2018 | ELS; 6 | ADE | ADE | ADE | LBH | LBH | BAR | BAR | DET | DET | TEX | TEX | ROA | ROA | SMP | SMP | **HLN**; 6 | HLN; 9 | MXC | MXC | | | 13th | 62 | |
| 2019 | COA | COA | TEX; 1* | TEX; 1* | LBH; 2* | LBH; 4 | TOR | TOR | MOH | MOH | MOH | MOH | ROA | ROA | ROA | POR; 1* | POR; 6 | SRF | SRF | | | | 7th | 179 | |
| 2020 | ADE | ADE | ADE | ROA; 2 | ROA; 3 | | | | | | | | | | | | | | | | | | N/A^{2} | – | |
| 2021 | STP; 1* | STP; 1* | MOH; 1* | MOH; 7 | MOH | MOH | NSH | NSH | LBH | LBH | | | | | | | | | | | | | 5th | 116 | |
^{†} – Replaced by Keegan Kincaid, points went to Creed · ^{‡} – Replaced by P. J. Jones, points went to Creed

^{1} The race was abandoned after Matt Mingay suffered serious injuries in a crash on lap three.
^{2} Standings were not recorded by the series for the 2020 season.

=== Dakar Rally ===
| Year | Class | Vehicle | Position | Stages won | Ref |
|---|---|---|---|---|---|
| 2016 | Car | Gordini | DSQ | 0 | |

Sporting positions
| Preceded by Robby Gordon | Stadium Super Trucks Champion; 2015–2016 | Succeeded by Paul Morris |
| Preceded by Austin Theriault | ARCA Racing Series Champion; 2018 | Succeeded by Christian Eckes |
| Preceded by Matt Crafton | NASCAR Gander RV & Outdoors Truck Series Champion; 2020 | Succeeded by Ben Rhodes |
