= 2023 Hollywood Casino 400 =

NASCAR Cup Series race

Race details
- Race 28 of 36 in the 2023 NASCAR Cup Series
- Date: September 10, 2023
- Location: Kansas Speedway in Kansas City, Kansas
- Course: Permanent racing facility
- Course length: 1.5 miles (2.4 km)
- Distance: 268 laps, 402 mi (643.2 km)
- Scheduled distance: 267 laps, 400.5 mi (640.8 km)
- Average speed: 125.212 miles per hour (201.509 km/h)

Pole position
Driver	Christopher Bell	Joe Gibbs Racing
- Time: 29.954

Most laps led
Driver	Kyle Larson	Hendrick Motorsports
- Laps: 99

Winner
No. 45	Tyler Reddick	23XI Racing

Television in the United States
- Network: USA
- Announcers: Rick Allen, Jeff Burton, Steve Letarte and Dale Earnhardt Jr.

Radio in the United States
- Radio: MRN
- Booth announcers: Alex Hayden, Jeff Striegle and Rusty Wallace
- Turn announcers: Dave Moody (1 & 2) and Mike Bagley (3 & 4)

The 2023 Hollywood Casino 400 was a NASCAR Cup Series race held on September 10, 2023, at Kansas Speedway in Kansas City, Kansas. Contested over 268 laps—extended from 267 laps due to an overtime finish, on the 1.5 mi (2.4 km) intermediate speedway, it was the 28th race of the 2023 NASCAR Cup Series season, the second race of the Playoffs, and the second race of the Round of 16.

== Report ==
=== Background ===
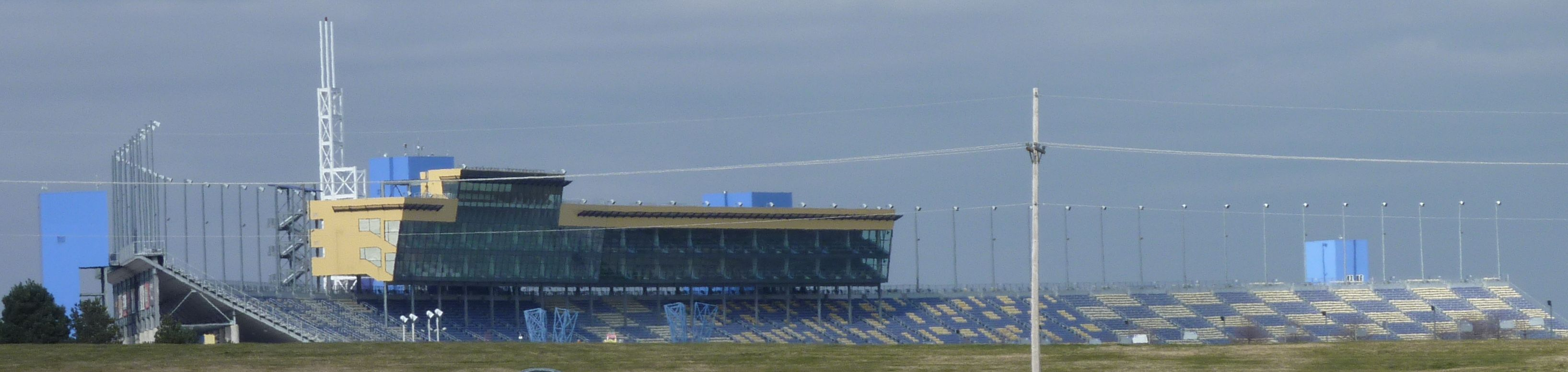
Kansas Speedway, the track where the race was held.

Kansas Speedway is a 1.5-mile (2.4 km) tri-oval race track in Kansas City, Kansas. It was built in 2001 and it currently hosts two annual NASCAR race weekends. The IndyCar Series also raced at here until 2011. The speedway is owned and operated by the International Speedway Corporation.

==== Entry list ====
- (R) denotes rookie driver.
- (i) denotes the driver ineligible for series driver points.
- (P) denotes playoff driver.
- (OP) denotes owner’s playoffs car.

No.	Driver	Team	Manufacturer
1	Ross Chastain (P)	Trackhouse Racing	Chevrolet
2	Austin Cindric	Team Penske	Ford
3	Austin Dillon	Richard Childress Racing	Chevrolet
4	Kevin Harvick (P)	Stewart-Haas Racing	Ford
5	Kyle Larson (P)	Hendrick Motorsports	Chevrolet
6	Brad Keselowski (P)	RFK Racing	Ford
7	Corey LaJoie	Spire Motorsports	Chevrolet
8	Kyle Busch (P)	Richard Childress Racing	Chevrolet
9	Chase Elliott (OP)	Hendrick Motorsports	Chevrolet
10	Aric Almirola	Stewart-Haas Racing	Ford
11	Denny Hamlin (P)	Joe Gibbs Racing	Toyota
12	Ryan Blaney (P)	Team Penske	Ford
14	Chase Briscoe	Stewart-Haas Racing	Ford
15	J. J. Yeley (i)	Rick Ware Racing	Ford
16	A. J. Allmendinger	Kaulig Racing	Chevrolet
17	Chris Buescher (P)	RFK Racing	Ford
19	Martin Truex Jr. (P)	Joe Gibbs Racing	Toyota
20	Christopher Bell (P)	Joe Gibbs Racing	Toyota
21	Harrison Burton	Wood Brothers Racing	Ford
22	Joey Logano (P)	Team Penske	Ford
23	Bubba Wallace (P)	23XI Racing	Toyota
24	William Byron (P)	Hendrick Motorsports	Chevrolet
31	Justin Haley	Kaulig Racing	Chevrolet
34	Michael McDowell (P)	Front Row Motorsports	Ford
38	Todd Gilliland	Front Row Motorsports	Ford
41	Ryan Preece	Stewart-Haas Racing	Ford
42	Carson Hocevar (i)	Legacy Motor Club	Chevrolet
43	Erik Jones	Legacy Motor Club	Chevrolet
45	Tyler Reddick (P)	23XI Racing	Toyota
47	Ricky Stenhouse Jr. (P)	JTG Daugherty Racing	Chevrolet
48	Alex Bowman	Hendrick Motorsports	Chevrolet
51	Cole Custer (i)	Rick Ware Racing	Ford
54	Ty Gibbs (R)	Joe Gibbs Racing	Toyota
77	Ty Dillon	Spire Motorsports	Chevrolet
78	Sheldon Creed (i)	Live Fast Motorsports	Chevrolet
99	Daniel Suárez	Trackhouse Racing	Chevrolet
Official entry list

== Practice ==
Tyler Reddick was the fastest in the practice session with a time of 30.200 seconds and a speed of 178.808 mph (287.764 km/h).

=== Practice results ===
Pos	No.	Driver	Team	Manufacturer	Time	Speed
1	45	Tyler Reddick (P)	23XI Racing	Toyota	30.200	178.808
2	24	William Byron (P)	Hendrick Motorsports	Chevrolet	30.378	177.760
3	23	Bubba Wallace (P)	23XI Racing	Toyota	30.390	177.690
Official practice results

== Qualifying ==
Christopher Bell scored the pole for the race with a time of 29.954 and a speed of 180.276 mph (290.126 km/h).

=== Qualifying results ===
Pos	No.	Driver	Team	Manufacturer	R1	R2
1	20	Christopher Bell (P)	Joe Gibbs Racing	Toyota	30.126	29.954
2	5	Kyle Larson (P)	Hendrick Motorsports	Chevrolet	30.162	30.029
3	19	Martin Truex Jr. (P)	Joe Gibbs Racing	Toyota	30.375	30.207
4	9	Chase Elliott (OP)	Hendrick Motorsports	Chevrolet	30.381	30.227
5	45	Tyler Reddick (P)	23XI Racing	Toyota	30.199	30.253
6	1	Ross Chastain (P)	Trackhouse Racing	Chevrolet	29.925	30.282
7	34	Michael McDowell (P)	Front Row Motorsports	Ford	30.175	30.291
8	3	Austin Dillon	Richard Childress Racing	Chevrolet	30.253	30.303
9	24	William Byron (P)	Hendrick Motorsports	Chevrolet	30.240	30.375
10	23	Bubba Wallace (P)	23XI Racing	Toyota	30.215	30.436
11	22	Joey Logano (P)	Team Penske	Ford	30.397	—
12	6	Brad Keselowski (P)	RFK Racing	Ford	30.404	—
13	17	Chris Buescher (P)	RFK Racing	Ford	30.417	—
14	11	Denny Hamlin (P)	Joe Gibbs Racing	Toyota	30.421	—
15	99	Daniel Suárez	Trackhouse Racing	Chevrolet	30.426	—
16	47	Ricky Stenhouse Jr. (P)	JTG Daugherty Racing	Chevrolet	30.437	—
17	12	Ryan Blaney (P)	Team Penske	Ford	30.451	—
18	2	Austin Cindric	Team Penske	Ford	30.458	—
19	43	Erik Jones	Legacy Motor Club	Chevrolet	30.469	—
20	4	Kevin Harvick (P)	Stewart-Haas Racing	Ford	30.516	—
21	42	Carson Hocevar (i)	Legacy Motor Club	Chevrolet	30.585	—
22	16	A. J. Allmendinger	Kaulig Racing	Chevrolet	30.587	—
23	7	Corey LaJoie	Spire Motorsports	Chevrolet	30.655	—
24	48	Alex Bowman	Hendrick Motorsports	Chevrolet	30.662	—
25	10	Aric Almirola	Stewart-Haas Racing	Ford	30.693	—
26	14	Chase Briscoe	Stewart-Haas Racing	Ford	30.711	—
27	51	Cole Custer (i)	Rick Ware Racing	Ford	30.724	—
28	41	Ryan Preece	Stewart-Haas Racing	Ford	30.756	—
29	21	Harrison Burton	Wood Brothers Racing	Ford	30.774	—
30	31	Justin Haley	Kaulig Racing	Chevrolet	30.818	—
31	15	J. J. Yeley (i)	Rick Ware Racing	Ford	30.889	—
32	38	Todd Gilliland	Front Row Motorsports	Ford	30.893	—
33	77	Ty Dillon	Spire Motorsports	Chevrolet	30.956	—
34	78	Sheldon Creed (i)	Live Fast Motorsports	Chevrolet	31.165	—
35	8	Kyle Busch (P)	Richard Childress Racing	Chevrolet	0.000	—
36	54	Ty Gibbs (R)	Joe Gibbs Racing	Toyota	0.000	—
Official qualifying results

== Race ==
=== Race results ===
==== Stage results ====
Stage One Laps: 80

Pos	No	Driver	Team	Manufacturer	Points
1	5	Kyle Larson (P)	Hendrick Motorsports	Chevrolet	10
2	23	Bubba Wallace (P)	23XI Racing	Toyota	9
3	20	Christopher Bell (P)	Joe Gibbs Racing	Toyota	8
4	1	Ross Chastain (P)	Trackhouse Racing	Chevrolet	7
5	12	Ryan Blaney (P)	Team Penske	Ford	6
6	45	Tyler Reddick (P)	23XI Racing	Toyota	5
7	11	Denny Hamlin (P)	Joe Gibbs Racing	Toyota	4
8	6	Brad Keselowski (P)	RFK Racing	Ford	3
9	9	Chase Elliott (OP)	Hendrick Motorsports	Chevrolet	2
10	4	Kevin Harvick (P)	Stewart-Haas Racing	Ford	1
Official stage one results

Stage Two Laps: 85

Pos	No	Driver	Team	Manufacturer	Points
1	6	Brad Keselowski (P)	RFK Racing	Ford	10
2	11	Denny Hamlin (P)	Joe Gibbs Racing	Toyota	9
3	9	Chase Elliott (OP)	Hendrick Motorsports	Chevrolet	8
4	4	Kevin Harvick (P)	Stewart-Haas Racing	Ford	7
5	45	Tyler Reddick (P)	23XI Racing	Toyota	6
6	43	Erik Jones	Legacy Motor Club	Chevrolet	5
7	12	Ryan Blaney (P)	Team Penske	Ford	4
8	22	Joey Logano (P)	Team Penske	Ford	3
9	17	Chris Buescher (P)	RFK Racing	Ford	2
10	20	Christopher Bell (P)	Joe Gibbs Racing	Toyota	1
Official stage two results

=== Final Stage results ===
Stage Three Laps: 102

Pos	Grid	No	Driver	Team	Manufacturer	Laps	Points
1	5	45	Tyler Reddick (P)	23XI Racing	Toyota	268	51
2	14	11	Denny Hamlin (P)	Joe Gibbs Racing	Toyota	268	48
3	19	43	Erik Jones	Legacy Motor Club	Chevrolet	268	39
4	2	5	Kyle Larson (P)	Hendrick Motorsports	Chevrolet	268	43
5	11	22	Joey Logano (P)	Team Penske	Ford	268	35
6	4	9	Chase Elliott (OP)	Hendrick Motorsports	Chevrolet	268	41
7	35	8	Kyle Busch (P)	Richard Childress Racing	Chevrolet	268	30
8	1	20	Christopher Bell (P)	Joe Gibbs Racing	Toyota	268	38
9	12	6	Brad Keselowski (P)	RFK Racing	Ford	268	41
10	24	48	Alex Bowman	Hendrick Motorsports	Chevrolet	268	27
11	20	4	Kevin Harvick (P)	Stewart-Haas Racing	Ford	268	34
12	17	12	Ryan Blaney (P)	Team Penske	Ford	268	35
13	6	1	Ross Chastain (P)	Trackhouse Racing	Chevrolet	268	31
14	36	54	Ty Gibbs (R)	Joe Gibbs Racing	Toyota	268	23
15	9	24	William Byron (P)	Hendrick Motorsports	Chevrolet	268	22
16	15	99	Daniel Suárez	Trackhouse Racing	Chevrolet	268	21
17	25	10	Aric Almirola	Stewart-Haas Racing	Ford	268	20
18	28	41	Ryan Preece	Stewart-Haas Racing	Ford	268	19
19	26	14	Chase Briscoe	Stewart-Haas Racing	Ford	268	18
20	21	42	Carson Hocevar (i)	Legacy Motor Club	Chevrolet	268	0
21	30	31	Justin Haley	Kaulig Racing	Chevrolet	268	16
22	23	7	Corey LaJoie	Spire Motorsports	Chevrolet	268	15
23	16	47	Ricky Stenhouse Jr. (P)	JTG Daugherty Racing	Chevrolet	268	14
24	27	51	Cole Custer (i)	Rick Ware Racing	Ford	268	0
25	32	38	Todd Gilliland	Front Row Motorsports	Ford	267	12
26	7	34	Michael McDowell (P)	Front Row Motorsports	Ford	267	11
27	13	17	Chris Buescher (P)	RFK Racing	Ford	267	12
28	33	77	Ty Dillon	Spire Motorsports	Chevrolet	267	9
29	34	78	Sheldon Creed (i)	Live Fast Motorsports	Chevrolet	266	0
30	22	16	A. J. Allmendinger	Kaulig Racing	Chevrolet	266	7
31	18	2	Austin Cindric	Team Penske	Ford	266	6
32	10	23	Bubba Wallace (P)	23XI Racing	Toyota	264	14
33	8	3	Austin Dillon	Richard Childress Racing	Chevrolet	259	4
34	31	15	J. J. Yeley (i)	Rick Ware Racing	Ford	212	0
35	29	21	Harrison Burton	Wood Brothers Racing	Ford	175	2
36	3	19	Martin Truex Jr. (P)	Joe Gibbs Racing	Toyota	3	1
Official race results

=== Race statistics ===
- Lead changes: 19 among 10 different drivers
- Cautions/Laps: 9 for 45 laps
- Red flags: 0
- Time of race: 3 hours, 12 minutes, and 38 seconds
- Average speed: 125.212 miles per hour (201.509 km/h)

== Media ==
=== Television ===
USA covered the race on the television side. Rick Allen, Jeff Burton, Steve Letarte and Dale Earnhardt Jr. called the race from the broadcast booth. Dave Burns, Kim Coon and Parker Kligerman handled the pit road duties from pit lane.

USA
Booth announcers	Pit reporters
Lap-by-lap: Rick Allen; Color-commentator: Jeff Burton; Color-commentator: Steve Letarte; Color-commentator: Dale Earnhardt Jr.	Dave Burns; Kim Coon; Parker Kligerman

=== Radio ===
MRN had the radio call for the race, which was also simulcast on Sirius XM NASCAR Radio. Alex Hayden, Jeff Striegle and 1989 NASCAR Cup Series Champion Rusty Wallace called the race for MRN when the field raced thru the front straightaway. Dave Moody called the race for MRN from Turns 1 & 2, and Mike Bagley called the race for MRN from turns 3 & 4. Steve Post, Chris Wilner, Jacklyn Drake and Brienne Pedigo covered the action for MRN from pit lane.

MRN
Booth announcers	Turn announcers	Pit reporters
Lead announcer: Alex Hayden; Announcer: Jeff Striegle; Announcer: Rusty Wallace	Turns 1 & 2: Dave Moody; Turns 3 & 4: Mike Bagley	Steve Post; Chris Wilner; Jacklyn Drake; Brienne Pedigo

== Standings after the race ==
Drivers' Championship standings

	Pos	Driver	Points
1	1	Kyle Larson	2,117
1	2	Tyler Reddick	2,111 (–6)
2	3	Denny Hamlin	2,105 (–12)
3	4	William Byron	2,097 (–20)
3	5	Brad Keselowski	2,089 (–28)
3	6	Ryan Blaney	2,081 (–36)
	7	Kyle Busch	2,080 (–37)
2	8	Ross Chastain	2,074 (–43)
5	9	Chris Buescher	2,069 (–48)
2	10	Christopher Bell	2,069 (–48)
	11	Joey Logano	2,068 (–49)
2	12	Kevin Harvick	2,063 (–54)
7	13	Martin Truex Jr.	2,056 (–61)
1	14	Bubba Wallace	2,044 (–73)
	15	Ricky Stenhouse Jr.	2,041 (–76)
	16	Michael McDowell	2,023 (–94)
Official driver's standings

Manufacturers' Championship standings

	Pos	Manufacturer	Points
	1	Chevrolet	1,035
1	2	Toyota	967 (–68)
1	3	Ford	961 (–74)

- Note: Only the first 16 positions are included for the driver standings.

Previous race: 2023 Cook Out Southern 500	NASCAR Cup Series; 2023 season	Next race: 2023 Bass Pro Shops Night Race
