= POWRi Midget Racing =

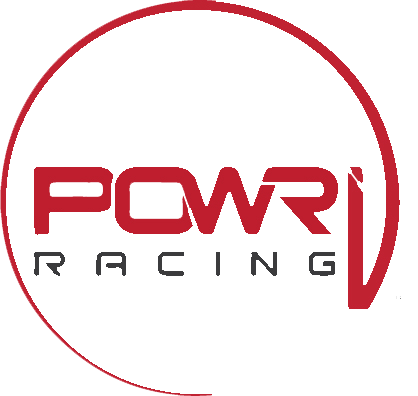

POWRi (Performance Open Wheeled Racing, inc.) is a dirt track racing sanctioning body based in the United States, founded by promoter Kenny Brown.

It organizes the POWRi National Midget Series, a midget car racing series rival to the USAC National Midget Series, as well as the POWRi West Midget Series and POWRi Outlaw Midget Series feeder series. Also it organizes sprint car racing series such as the POWRi WAR Sprints (wingless), Bandit Outlaw Sprint Series and Desert Wing Sprint League (winged), plus the POWRi 600cc Outlaw Micro Sprints.

Drivers that have competed in POWRi events include Tony Stewart, Kyle Larson, Bryan Clauson, Brady Bacon, Christopher Bell, Dave Darland, Rico Abreu and Andrew Felker.

== Cars ==
Sprint cars weight 1,475 pounds and have 410 cu in engines that produce 900 horsepower.

A typical Midget weighs about 1,000 pounds and produces up to 350 horsepower from its four-cylinder engine. They are intended to be driven for races of relatively short distances, usually 2.5 to 25 miles (4 to 40 km).

== History ==
The Gateway Racing Midget Series debuted in 2005, and was rebranded the POWRi National Midget Series in 2006 after a lawsuit by Gateway International Raceway owner Dover Motorsports.

The POWRi West Midget Series was launched in 2012.

POWRi is the only current midget series to compete at Lucas Oil Speedway in Wheatland, Missouri.

POWRi has expanded to other countries in order to grow midget racing on an international level. It entered into a multi-year agreement to sanction the POWRi Lucas Oil Australian Speedcar Super Series and the POWRi Lucas Oil New Zealand Midget Super Series. The three series operate under the same technical regulations and procedures. It establishes a platform for a Midget World Championship, which POWRi organized for the 2013/14 season. The 16-race series began in Australia and New Zealand in December 2013 and it ended in June 2014 with four events in Illinois, United States.

In November 2016, POWRi announced that they would begin to sanction the POWRi WAR Sprint Car Series for the 2017 season. The organization sanctioned the Elite Sprint Car Series for the 2018 season, but the partnership was dissolved in 2019.

== POWRi National Midget League ==
The National Midgets are 900 pound cars putting out up to 370 horsepower racing on dirt tracks from 1/5-mile bullrings to high banked half miles.

Drivers such as Tony Stewart, Jeff Gordon, Ken Schrader, Kasey Kahne, Ryan Newman, Kyle Larson, Christopher Bell and Rico Abreu plus many others have used these cars as stepping-stones to Nascar and the IRL.

== Champions ==
=== POWRi National Midget League ===
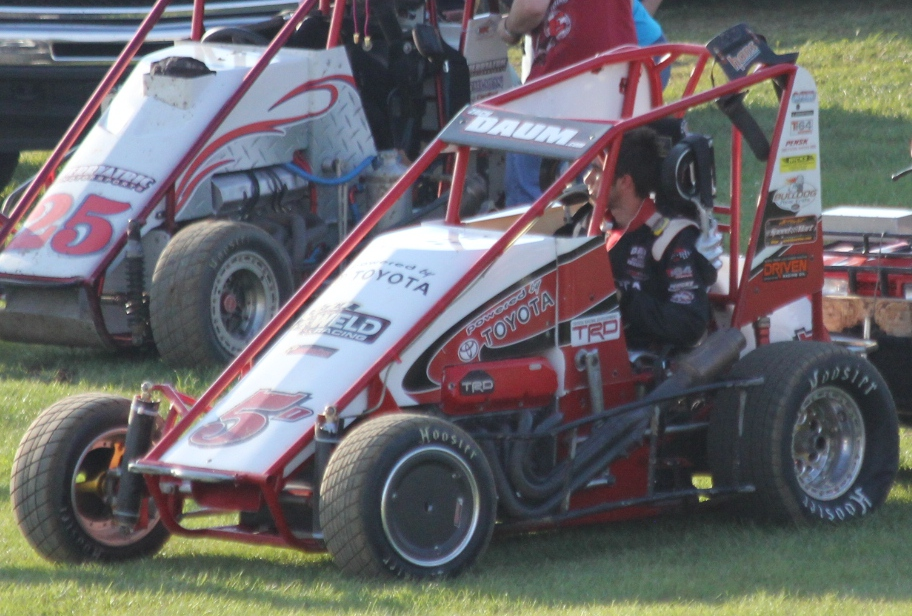
Zack Daum's midget in 2014

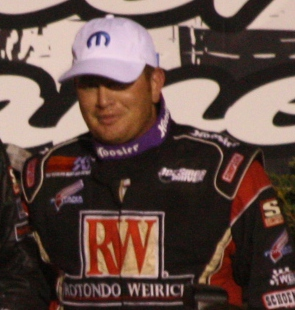
Brad Kuhn, 2006/2009 champion

- 2023 - Karter Sarff (Mason City, IL)
- 2022 - Brenham Crouch (Lubbock, TX)
- 2021 - Bryant Wiedeman (Colby, KS)
- 2020 - Jake Neuman (New Berlin, IL)
- 2019 - Jesse Colwell (Red Bluff, CA)
- 2018 - Tucker Klaasmeyer (Paola, KS)
- 2017 - Logan Seavey (Sutter, CA)
- 2016 - Zach Daum (Pocahontas, IL)
- 2015 - Darren Hagen (Riverside, CA)
- 2014 - Zach Daum (Pocahontas, Illinois)
- 2013 - Zach Daum (Pocahontas, Illinois)
- 2012 - Andrew Felker (Carl Junction, MO)
- 2011 - Brad Loyet (Sunset Hills, MO)
- 2010 - Brad Loyet (Sunset Hills, MO)
- 2009 - Brad Kuhn (Avon, IN)
- 2008 - Brett Anderson (Belleville, IL)
- 2007 - Brad Loyet (Sunset Hills, MO)
- 2006 - Brad Kuhn (Avon, IN)
- 2005 - Mike Hess (Riverton, IL)

=== POWRi West Midget League ===
- 2023 - Michelle Decker
- 2022 - Emilio Hoover (Broken Arrow, OK)
- 2021 - Emilo Hoover (Broken Arrow, OK)
- 2020 - Andrew Felker (Carl Junction, MO)
- 2019 - Andrew Felker (Carl Junction, MO)
- 2018 - Kory Schudy (Springfield, MO)
- 2017 - Grady Chandler (Edmond, OK)
- 2016 - Steven Shebester (Pauls Valley, OK)
- 2015 - Anton Hernandez (Arlington, TX)
- 2014 - Alex Sewell (Broken Arrow, OK)

=== POWRi WAR Sprint Car League ===
- 2023 - Jack Wagner
- 2022 - Kory Schudy
- 2021 - Mario Clouser (Chatham, IL)
- 2020 - Riley Kreisel (Warsaw, MO)
- 2019 - Riley Kreisel (Warsaw, MO)
- 2018 - Riley Kreisel (Warsaw, MO)
- 2017 - Korey Weyant (Springfield, IL)

=== POWRi 410 Bandit Outlaw Sprint League ===
- 2023 - Ayrton Gennetten
- 2022 - Roger Crocket

=== POWRi 305 Wing Sprint Series ===
- 2023 - Brett Combs

=== POWRi 600cc Outlaw Micro Sprint League ===
- 2023 - Kale Drake
- 2022 - John Barnard
- 2021 - Bradley Fezard (Bonnerdale, AR)
- 2020 - Harley Hollan (Tulsa, OK)
- 2019 - Gunner Ramey (Sedalia, MO)
- 2018 - Harley Hollan (Tulsa, OK)
- 2017 - Joe B. Miller (Millersville, NO)
- 2016 - Nathan Benson (Concordia, MO)
- 2015 - Nathan Benson (Concordia, MO)
- 2014 - Nathan Benson (Concordia, MO)
- 2013 - Nathan Benson (Concordia, MO)
- 2012 - Joe B. Miller (Millersville, MO)
- 2011 - Trent Beckinger (Evansville, IN)
- 2010 - Jeremy Camp (Blue Mound, IL)
- 2009 - Dereck King (Goreville, IL)
- 2008 - Dereck King (Goreville, IL)
- 2007 - Dereck King (Goreville, IL)
- 2006 - Kevin Bayer (Bixby, OK)
- 2005 - Daniel Robinson (Mt. Vernon, IL)

=== POWRi WAR East / Wildcard Sprints ===
- 2018 - Landon Simon (Brownsburg, IN)
- 2017 - Korey Weyant (Springfield, IL)

=== POWRi Elite Sprints ===
- 2018 - Paul White (Waco, TX)
