= Steven Behn =

German athlete (born 1995)

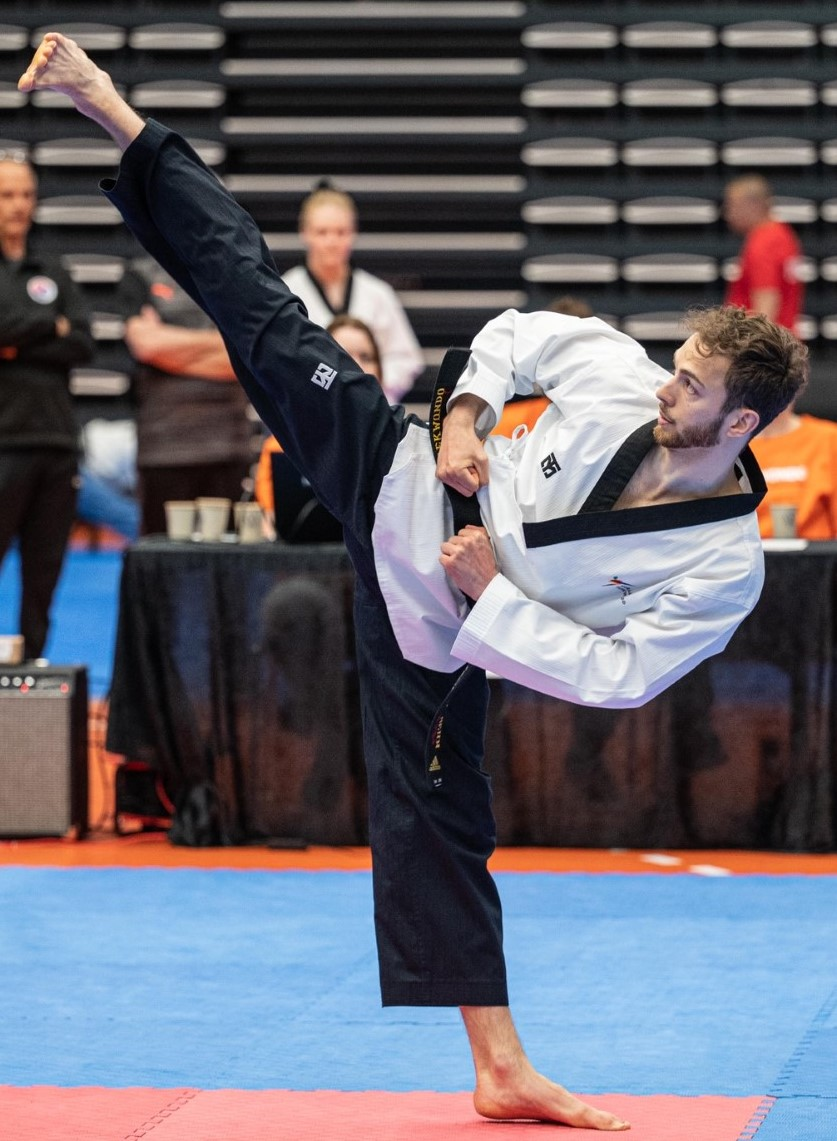
- Steven Behn competing a side kick

Personal information
- Born: 12 October 1995 (age 31)
- Education: University of Hamburg; University of Hagen
- Occupation: Youth counsellor

Sport
- Country: Germany
- Sport: Taekwondo
- Events: Recognized Poomsae; Freestyle Poomsae
- Club: Taekwondo Team Fuhlsbüttel e. V.
- Coached by: Matthias Behn
- Now coaching: Leah Lawall

Achievements and titles
- World finals: 3rd place, bronze medalist(s)
- Regional finals: 1st place, gold medalist(s)
- Highest world ranking: 30 (2025)
Medal record
Men's Taekwondo
Representing Germany
World Championships
Bronze medal – third place	2018 Taipei	Freestyle, team over 17
European Championships
Gold medal – first place	2015 Belgrade	Freestyle, team over 18
Gold medal – first place	2017 Rhodes	Freestyle, team over 12
Bronze medal – third place	2019 Antalya	Poomsae, pair under 30
Bronze medal – third place	2019 Antalya	Freestyle, team over 12
Bronze medal – third place	2021 Seixal	Freestyle, pair over 17
Bronze medal – third place	2025 Tallinn	Freestyle, team over 12
European Cup
Gold medal – first place	2022 Stockholm	Freestyle, pair over 17
- Updated on 15 November 2026

Steven Behn (born 12 October 1995) is a German taekwondo athlete, six-time European poomsae medalist, two-time European freestyle champion and 2018 world bronze medalist.

== Career history ==
Steven Behn began practising the Korean martial art of taekwondo at his father's sports club in Hamburg in 2002.

In 2015, he took part in his first international senior competition, the European Taekwondo Championships in Belgrade, where he became European champion in the freestyle competition with the mixed team (consisting of five team members, at least two men and two women).

In 2016, Behn competed at the World Championships in Lima, where he placed sixth with the mixed team and in pairs (a two-person team consisting of one man and one woman). In 2017, he took part in the FISU World University Games in Taipei, where he finished in seventh place in the men's team competition. At the European Championships in Rhodes in the same year, he became European champion in the freestyle competition with the mixed team for a second time.

At the 2018 World Championships in Taipei, Behn won a bronze medal in the freestyle competition together with the mixed team. The following year, at the 2019 European Championships in Antalya, Behn won a bronze medal in pairs in the discipline of traditional poomsae. He also won a second bronze medal in the freestyle team competition at these European Championships.

In 2019, Behn once again took part in the World University Games, which were held in Naples. There, as in 2017, he finished seventh in the men's team competition. At the 2021 European Championships in Seixal, he won a bronze medal in the pairs' freestyle competition.

Behn took part in the 2022 World Championships in Goyang, where he finished fifth in the freestyle pairs competition. In 2023, he became German champion in the men's individual freestyle competition for the first time. He also won his seventh German runner-up title overall in the individual's traditional poomsae competition. In 2024, he competed at the World Poomsae Championships in Hong Kong in the semifinals of the men's individual freestyle competition, where he narrowly missed moving on to the eight-person final.

At the 2025 European Championships held in Tallinn, Steven Behn won a bronze medal with the German freestyle team.

== Personal life & career ==
Behn studied psychology at the University of Hamburg and the University of Hagen and works as a research assistant. Since 2018, he has been appointed as the regional coach for poomsae at the Hamburg Taekwondo Association, and since 2023 is a certified sports psychology expert for the area of competitive sport. In June 2026, he was appointed youth counsellor (full-time) for the Deutsche Taekwondo Jugend, the youth organisation of the German Taekwondo Union (DTU).

At the 2025 World University Games, Steven Behn was nominated as team Germany's coach for poomsae, which at this competition was performed in combination with freestyle. During this tournament, he supervised athletes Leah Lawall, Adina Machwirth and Anna Siepmann, who as the women's team won a bronze medal in this discipline for Germany for the first time.

== Tournament record ==
Year	Event	Location	G-Rank	Discipline	Place
2025	European Championships	(Estonia) Tallinn	G-4	Freestyle Team	3rd
2025	Belgian Open	(Belgium) Lommel	G-1	Freestyle Team	1st
2024	World Championships	Hong Kong	G-8	Freestyle Individual	PAR
2024	Belgian Open	(Belgium) Lommel	G-2	Freestyle Individual	3rd
2024	Austrian Open	(Austria) Vienna	G-1	Freestyle Individual	2nd
2024	Danish Open	(Denmark) Skanderborg	-	Poomsae Individual	3rd
2024	Danish Open	(Denmark) Skanderborg	-	Freestyle Individual	2nd
2024	London International Open	(United Kingdom) London	-	Freestyle Individual	3rd
2023	Croatia Open	(Croatia) Zagreb	G-1	Freestyle Individual	3rd
2023	Swedish Open	(Sweden) Stockholm	G-1	Freestyle Individual	3rd
2023	German Open	(Germany) Hamburg	-	Freestyle Individual	1st
2023	German Open	(Germany) Hamburg	-	Freestyle Pair	1st
2023	Danish Open	(Denmark) Skanderborg	-	Freestyle Individual	1st
2022	European Cup	(Sweden) Stockholm	G-2	Freestyle Pair	1st
2022	Swedish Open	(Sweden) Stockholm	G-2	Freestyle Pair	1st
2022	Danish Open	(Denmark) Skanderborg	-	Freestyle Individual	2nd
2022	Danish Open	(Denmark) Skanderborg	-	Poomsae Individual	2nd
2022	Danish Open	(Denmark) Skanderborg	-	Freestyle Pair	1st
2022	Danish Open	(Denmark) Skanderborg	-	Poomsae Pair	2nd
2022	World Championships	(South Korea) Goyang	G-8	Freestyle Pair	5th
2021	European Championships	(Portugal) Seixal	G-4	Freestyle Pair	3rd
2019	FISU World University Games	(Italy) Naples	G-2	Poomsae Team	7th
2019	European Championships	(Turkey) Antalya	G-4	Poomsae, Pair	3rd
2019	European Championships	(Turkey) Antalya	G-4	Freestyle Team	3rd
2018	World Championships	(Chinese Taipei) Taipei	G-8	Freestyle Team	3rd
2017	FISU World University Games	(Chinese Taipei) Taipei	G-2	Poomsae Team	7th
2017	European Championships	(Greece) Rhodes	G-4	Freestyle Team	1st
2015	European Championships	(Serbia) Belgrade	G-4	Freestyle Team	1st
