= Christian Senft =

German athlete (born 1975)

Personal information
- Born: 7 January 1975 (age 51)
- Occupation: Educator

Sport
- Country: Germany
- Sport: Taekwondo
- Event: Recognized Poomsae
- Club: Redfire Kampfsport Team e. V.
- Now coaching: Bianca Schönemeier; Werner Unland; Heekyung Reimann; Tina Herrmann

Achievements and titles
- World finals: 2nd place, silver medalist(s)
- Regional finals: 1st place, gold medalist(s)
Medal record
Men's Taekwondo
Representing Germany
World Championships
Silver medal – second place	Taipei 2018	Poomsae, m under 50
European Championships
Gold medal – first place	Antalya 2019	Poomsae, m under 50
Gold medal – first place	Innsbruck 2023	Poomsae, men's team
Silver medal – second place	Ajaccio 2003	Poomsae, mixed
Silver medal – second place	Turku 2005	Poomsae, mixed team
Bronze medal – third place	Turku 2005	Poomsae, men's team
Bronze medal – third place	Belgrade 2015	Poomsae, men's team
Bronze medal – third place	Rhodes 2017	Poomsae, men's team
Bronze medal – third place	Antalya 2019	Poomsae, men's team
Bronze medal – third place	Innsbruck 2023	Poomsae, m under 50
Bronze medal – third place	Tallinn 2025	Poomsae, men's team
World Taekwondo Hanmadang
Silver medal – second place	Pyeongtaek 2015	Poomsae, men's team
World Masters Games
Gold medal – first place	Turin 2013	Poomsae, individual
European Masters Games
Gold medal – first place	Lignano 2011	Poomsae, mover 35
Gold medal – first place	Nice 2015	Poomsae, m over 35
WT President's Cup – Europe
Gold medal – first place	Bonn 2016	Poomsae, men's team
Gold medal – first place	Sindelfingen 2019	Poomsae, men's team
Gold medal – first place	Innsbruck 2025	Poomsae, men's team
Silver medal – second place	Bonn 2016	Poomsae, m under 50
Bronze medal – third place	Sindelfingen 2019	Poomsae, m under 50
- Updated on 15 November 2026

Christian Senft (born 7 January 1975) is a German taekwondo practitioner who competes in traditional poomsae. He was a silver medalist at the 2018 World Championships and European champion in 2019 as well as 2023.

== Background ==
Christian Senft began practicing taekwondo in 1987 at the age of twelve at the Yoo-Sin-Club in Bad Münder, Germany. He took on his first coaching responsibilities in 1992. In 2004, he founded the Redfire Kampfsport Team, which he represents as both a coach and a competitor.

Senft has been a member of the German national poomsae team since 2003. In addition to taekwondo, he holds an 8th Dan black belt in taekwondo and also practices ju-jutsu, judo and budo-jutsu. Since 2020, he is a Senior Director of Studies (German: Studiendirektor) at the teacher training institute in Hildesheim, where he serves as a subject coordinator for physical education and is responsible for training trainee teachers in the subject.

== Competitive career ==
=== World Championships ===
Christian Senft achieved his best result at the 2018 World Poomsae Championships in Taipei, winning the silver medal in the men's under-50 individual competition.

At the 2022 World Poomsae Championships in Goyang, he finished 11th in the same age category. Two years later, at the 2024 World Championships in Hong Kong, he placed 11th in the pairs competition alongside Bianca Schönemeier and fifth in the men's team competition.

At the 2026 World Poomsae Championships in Chuncheon, South Korea, Senft competed in the men's under-60 individual category, finishing in 11th place after losing his opening match to Great Britain's Simon Negus, who went on to win the silver medal.

=== European Championships ===
Senft won his first European Championship medal in Ajaccio in 2003, taking silver in the mixed competition. At the 2005 European Championships in Turku, he earned another silver medal in the mixed team event and bronze in the men's team competition.

He went on to win further bronze medals in the team competition at the 2015 European Championships in Belgrade and the 2017 championships in Rhodes. In 2019, he became European champion in the men's under-50 individual category in Antalya, where he also won bronze in the team competition.

At the 2023 European Championships in Innsbruck, Senft won his second European title in the men's team competition and also earned bronze in the individual event. He added another team bronze medal at the 2025 European Championships in Tallinn.

In total, Senft has won ten European Championship medals: two gold, two silver and six bronze.

=== Other achievements ===
In 2013, Senft won gold in the individual competition at the World Masters Games in Turin. He also won gold in the individual poomsae competition at the European Masters Games in Lignano in 2011 and Nice in 2015. At the 2015 World Taekwondo Hanmadang in Pyeongtaek, South Korea, he won silver in the men's team competition alongside Michael Bußmann and Kai Müller. He has won a total of 20 medals at the German National Championships across various individual, pairs and team events.

== Coaching and official roles ==
Senft has worked as a taekwondo instructor since 1992. In 2004, he founded the Redfire Kampfsport Team, for which he also serves as a competition coach. According to the German Taekwondo Union (DTU), ten athletes coached by Senft have been selected for the German national team. Senft has also worked as a coach at international Poomsae championships, including the European Championships in 2019 and 2021 and the World Championships in 2024 and 2026. His coaching activities included individual, pair, and team competitions.

The Redfire Kampfsport Team received the Grünes Band für vorbildliche Talentförderung im Verein (Green Ribbon for Exemplary Youth Development in Sports Clubs) award in 2010 and 2016. Senft himself was awarded the Gold Badge of Honour by both the German Taekwondo Union (DTU) and the Lower Saxony Taekwondo Union (NTU).

He previously served as the NTU's State Education Officer, State Poomsae Coach and Vice President for Education and Recreational Sports. At the national level, he was the DTU's Federal Education Officer from 2015 to 2024.
