= Adina Machwirth =

German athlete (born 2005)

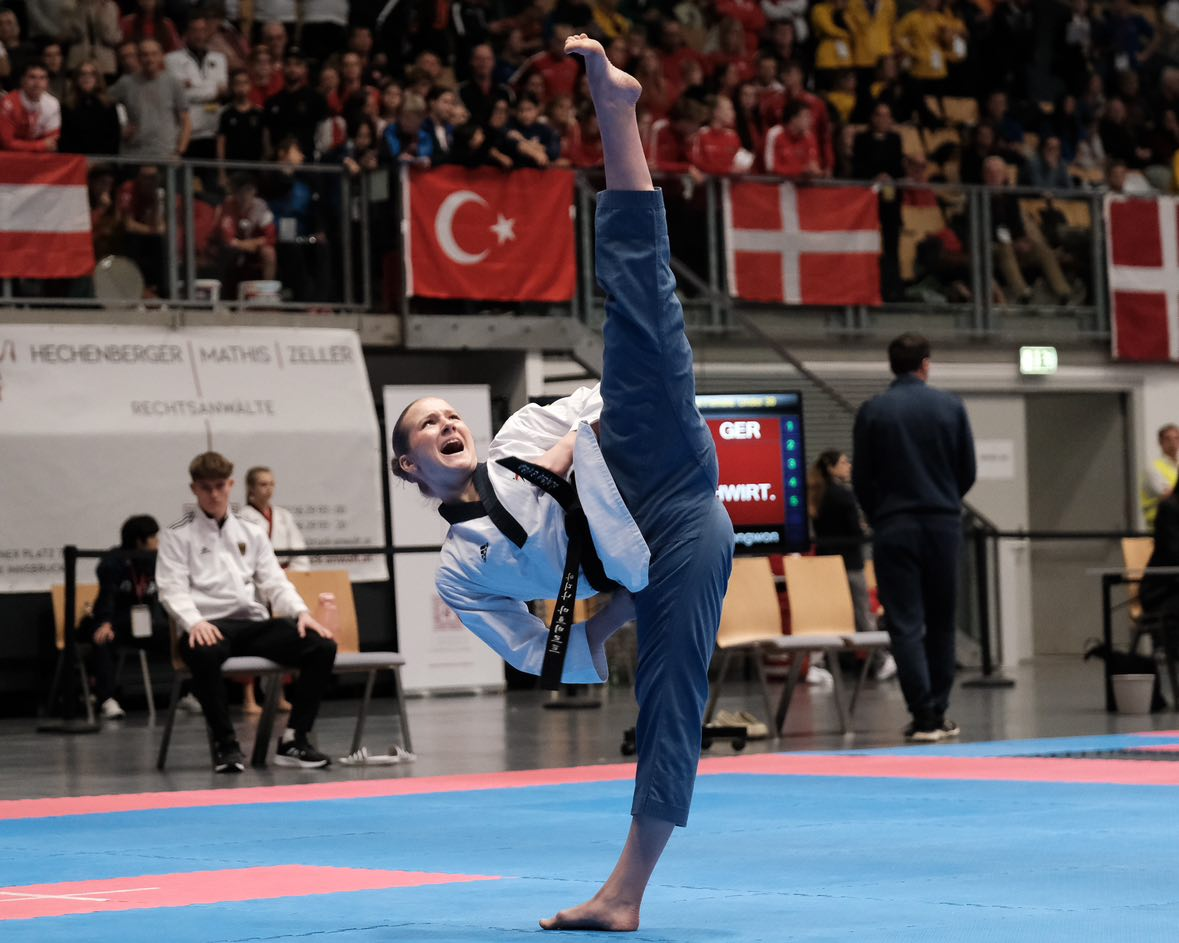
- Machwirth competing in 2023

Sport
- Country: Germany
- Sport: Taekwondo
- Events: Recognized Poomsae; Freestyle Poomsae
- Club: Budo-Schule Wiesbaden
- Coached by: Kai Müller

Achievements and titles
- World finals: 3rd place, bronze medalist(s)
- Regional finals: 1st place, gold medalist(s)
- Highest world ranking: 14 (2024)
Medal record
Women's Taekwondo
Representing Germany
Senior
World University Games
Bronze medal – third place	2025 Rhine-Ruhr	Poomsae/Freestyle, Team
Junior
World Championships
Bronze medal – third place	Goyang 2022	Freestyle, f under 17
European Championships
Gold medal – first place	Antalya 2019	Poomsae, team f
US Pan Am Series
Gold medal – first place	Fort Worth 2022	Freestyle, pairs

Adina Machwirth (born 2005) is a German taekwondo poomsae athlete and 2022 world bronze medalist.

== Career ==
Adina Machwirth began practising the Korean martial art of taekwondo in 2010 after initially training in ballet for three years. Machwirth competed in her first major international competition at the 2019 European Poomsae Championships in Antalya. There, she became European champion in the discipline of traditional forms with the cadet team (three-person team, female) alongside teammates Ana Catalina Pohl and Jessica Schober. She also competed in the freestyle pairs competition and the pairs competition in traditional poomsae, but did not reach the podium in those categories.

In 2021, Machwirth took part in the European Poomsae Championships in Seixal, Portugal, finishing sixth in the junior women's freestyle competition and fifth in the freestyle pairs competition. She won the freestyle pairs category of the 2022 US Pan Am Series I alongside Julius Müller. At the 2022 World Championships in Goyang, Machwirth won a bronze medal in the junior's individual freestyle competition.

At cadet and junior level, Machwirth has been German champion four times, runner-up three times and bronze medallist four times. She has been competing at senior level since 2023. In 2023, she became German champion in the senior's individual Recognized Poomsae competition as well as vice champion in the women's freestyle competition, behind teammate Leah Lawall.

At the 2023 European Championships in Innsbruck, Machwirth competed alongside teammate Anna Siepmann in the women's individual competition. She won the first round against Camille La Cour from Denmark, but lost to Eva Sandersen in the round of 16, finishing ninth. Machwirth also finished sixth in the individual freestyle competition at these European Championships.

== Tournament record ==
Year	Event	Location	G-Rank	Discipline	Place
2024	Croatia Open	(Croatia) Zagreb	G-1	Poomsae Individual	3rd
2024	Austrian Open	(Austria) Vienna	G-1	Freestyle Pair	1st
2024	Danish Open	(Denmark) Skanderborg	-	Poomsae Individual	3rd
2024	London International Open	(United Kingdom) London	-	Poomsae Individual	2nd
2024	London International Open	(United Kingdom) London	-	Freestyle Pair	2nd
2024	Bulgaria Open	(Bulgaria) Sofia	G-1	Freestyle Individual	2nd
2023	European Championships	(Austria) Innsbruck	G-4	Poomsae Individual	9th
2023	European Championships	(Austria) Innsbruck	G-4	Freestyle Individual	6th
2023	French Open	(France) Paris	G-1	Freestyle Individual	1st
2023	German Open	(Germany) Hamburg	-	Poomsae Individual	3rd
2023	German Open	(Germany) Hamburg	-	Freestyle Individual	3rd
2023	Swedish Open	(Sweden) Stockholm	G-1	Poomsae Individual	3rd
2023	Swedish Open	(Sweden) Stockholm	G-1	Freestyle Individual	3rd
2022	World Championships	(South Korea) Goyang	G-8	Freestyle Individual	3rd
2021	European Championships	(Portugal) Seixal	G-4	Freestyle Individual	6th
2021	European Championships	(Portugal) Seixal	G-4	Freestyle Pair	5th
2019	European Championships	(Turkey) Antalya	G-4	Poomsae Team	1st
2019	European Championships	(Turkey) Antalya	G-4	Poomsae Pair	n. a.
2019	European Championships	(Turkey) Antalya	G-4	Freestyle Pair	n. a.
