= Anh-Tuan Do =

German taekwondo athlete

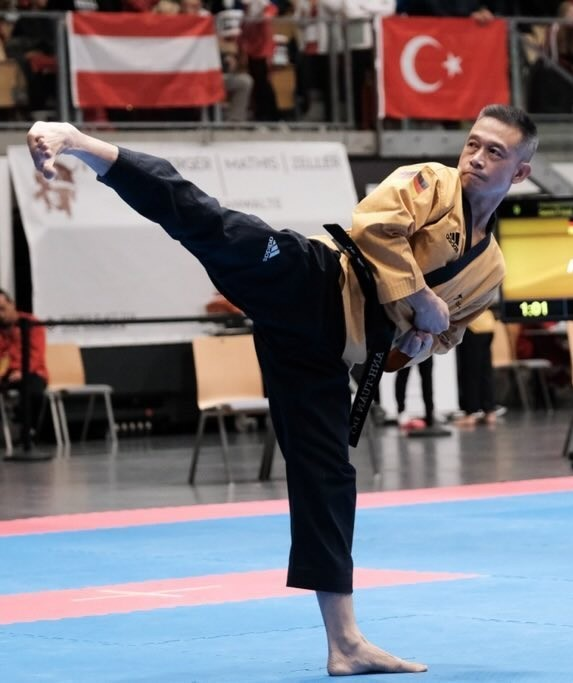
- Anh-Tuan Do competing in 2023

Personal information
- Born: 20 November 1971 (age 54)

Sport
- Country: Germany
- Sport: Taekwondo
- Event: Traditional Poomsae
- Club: Sportfreunde Bispingen
- Coached by: Georg Bombleski

Achievements and titles
- Regional finals: 1st place, gold medalist(s)
Medal record
Men's Taekwondo
Representing Germany
European Championships
Gold medal – first place	2023 Innsbruck	Poomsae, m<60
WT President's Cup
Silver medal – second place	2026 London	Poomsae, m<60
Silver medal – second place	2026 London	Poomsae, pair
European Cup
Silver medal – second place	2022 Solnahallen	Poomsae, m<60
- Updated on 1 July 2026

Anh-Tuan Do (born 20 November 1971) is a German taekwondo athlete and 2023 European Champion in traditional poomsae.

== Taekwondo career ==
Anh-Tuan Do started practicing the Korean martial arts taekwondo in 2017, following his children's participation in the sport. He is a member of the German poomsae national team.

Do started competing internationally in traditional poomsae in 2022, winning a bronze and a gold medal at the men's under 60 competition at the Swedish and Danish Open, respectively. He won silver at the 2022 European Cup. At the 2023 European Championships in Innsbruck, Do became European Champion in the men's 51 to 60 years competition, outscoring fellow national team member and coach of Pia Hoffmann Hans-Carsten Gauger in the finale.

== Personal life ==
Do is a graduate engineer. He is a poomsae referee and was the acting sports director for traditional poomsae of the Lower Saxony Taekwondo Union until 2025. Since 2026, he has been state coach for poomsae with both the Saxony-Anhalt Taekwondo Union and the Schleswig-Holstein Taekwondo Union.

== Tournament record ==
Year	Event	Location	G-Rank	Discipline	Place
2026	Austrian Open	(Austria) Vienna	G-1	Poomsae Pair	1st
2026	Austrian Open	(Austria) Vienna	G-1	Poomsae Team	2nd
2026	President's Cup	(United Kingdom) London	G-3	Poomsae Individual	2nd
2026	President's Cup	(United Kingdom) London	G-3	Poomsae Pair	2nd
2026	London Open	(United Kingdom) London	G-1	Poomsae Individual	3rd
2026	London Open	(United Kingdom) London	G-1	Poomsae Pair	3rd
2026	German Open	(Germany) Wiesbaden	G-1	Poomsae Pair	2nd
2025	Croatia Open	(Croatia) Zagreb	G-1	Poomsae Individual	1st
2025	Croatia Open	(Croatia) Zagreb	G-1	Poomsae Pair	1st
2025	Austrian Open	(Austria) Vienna	G-1	Poomsae Individual	3rd
2025	Austrian Open	(Austria) Vienna	G-1	Poomsae Pair	1st
2025	Danish Open	(Denmark) Skanderborg	-	Poomsae Individual	1st
2025	Danish Open	(Denmark) Skanderborg	-	Poomsae Pair	1st
2025	Belgian Open	(Belgium) Lommel	G-2	Poomsae Individual	1st
2025	Belgian Open	(Belgium) Lommel	G-2	Poomsae Pair	1st
2024	London Open	(United Kingdom) London	-	Poomsae Individual	3rd
2024	Belgian Open	(Belgium) Lommel	G-2	Poomsae Individual	3rd
2024	Austrian Open	(Austria) Vienna	G-1	Poomsae Individual	2nd
2024	Danish Open	(Denmark) Skanderborg	-	Poomsae Individual	2nd
2024	Bulgaria Open	(Bulgaria) Sofia	G-1	Poomsae Individual	1st
2023	European Championships	(Austria) Innsbruck	G-4	Poomsae Individual	1st
2023	French Open	(France) Paris	G-1	Poomsae Individual	1st
2023	German Open	(Germany) Hamburg	-	Poomsae Individual	2nd
2023	Swedish Open	(Sweden) Stockholm	G-1	Poomsae Individual	3rd
2023	Danish Open	(Denmark) Skanderborg	-	Poomsae Individual	1st
2022	Swedish Open	(Sweden) Stockholm	G-2	Poomsae Individual	3rd
2022	Danish Open	(Denmark) Skanderborg	-	Poomsae Individual	1st
2022	European Cup	(Sweden) Stockholm	G-2	Poomsae Individual	2nd
