= Ana Catalina Pohl =

German athlete (born 2005)

Personal information
- Nationality: German

Sport
- Country: Germany
- Sport: Taekwondo
- Events: Recognized Poomsae; Freestyle Poomsae
- Club: Dojang Frankfurt
- Coached by: Imke Turner

Achievements and titles
- Regional finals: 1st place, gold medalist(s)
Medal record
Women's Taekwondo
Representing Germany
Senior
European Championships
Silver medal – second place	2023 Innsbruck	Freestyle, team mixed
Bronze medal – third place	2025 Tallinn	Freestyle, team mixed
Junior
European Championships
Gold medal – first place	2019 Antalya	Poomsae, team f
Bronze medal – third place	2019 Antalya	Poomsae Individual

Ana Catalina Pohl (born 2005) is a German taekwondo athlete and four-time European poomsae medalist.

== Career ==
Pohl started practising the Korean martial arts taekwondo at the age of seven and trains at Dojang Frankfurt in Hessen, Germany.

In 2016, she took part in her first international competition, the Austrian Open Poomsae in Vienna, where she claimed second place in the individual cadet competition in traditional poomsae. This competition was the first tournament to have been assigned a G-ranking (G-1) under the Taekwondo Poomsae World Ranking system.

At the European Poomsae Championships in Antalya in 2019, Pohl became European Champion with the female cadets' team (three-person team) alongside teammates Adina Machwirth and Jessica Schober. She also won a bronze medal in the individual traditional poomsae competition. In 2022, she took part in the World Poomsae Championships in Goyang, where she placed fifth in traditional forms with Pia Hoffmann and Helena Silberhorn in the juniors' female team competition. She also participated in the juniors' individual poomsae competition, where she placed fourth in the preliminary round and fifteenth in the semi-final, therefore she did not advance to the finale.

Pohl claimed her first senior German championship title with the freestyle team in 2022 and, at cadet and junior level, has been German champion four times and both runner-up and bronze medallist twice.

At the 2023 European Poomsae Championships in Innsbruck, Pohl, as part of the mixed team (consisting of five team members, at least two men and two women), won a silver medal in the seniors' freestyle competition alongside teammates Pia Hoffmann, Leah Lawall, Julius Müller and Jules Berger. In 2024, she competed as part of the mixed freestyle team at the World Poomsae Championships in Hong Kong, with which she placed fifth in the semi-finals and ultimately seventh in the final.

At the 2025 European Championships held in Tallinn, she won a bronze medal with the German freestyle team.

== Tournament record ==
Year	Event	Location	G-Rank	Discipline	Place
2025	European Championships	(Estonia) Tallinn	G-4	Freestyle Team	3rd
2024	World Championships	Hong Kong	G-8	Freestyle Team	7th
2023	European Championships	(Austria) Innsbruck	G-4	Freestyle Team	2nd
2023	French Open	(France) Paris	G-1	Poomsae Individual	3rd
2023	French Open	(France) Paris	G-1	Freestyle Team	1st
2023	German Open	(Germany) Hamburg	-	Freestyle Team	1st
2023	German Championships	(Germany) Bautzen	-	Poomsae Individual	2nd
2022	World Championships	(South Korea) Goyang	G-8	Poomsae Team	5th
2022	German Championships	(Germany) Gehrden	-	Freestyle Team	1st
2019	European Championships	(Turkey) Antalya	G-4	Poomsae Individual	3rd
2019	European Championships	(Turkey) Antalya	G-4	Poomsae Team	1st
