= Pia Hoffmann =

German athlete (born 2006)

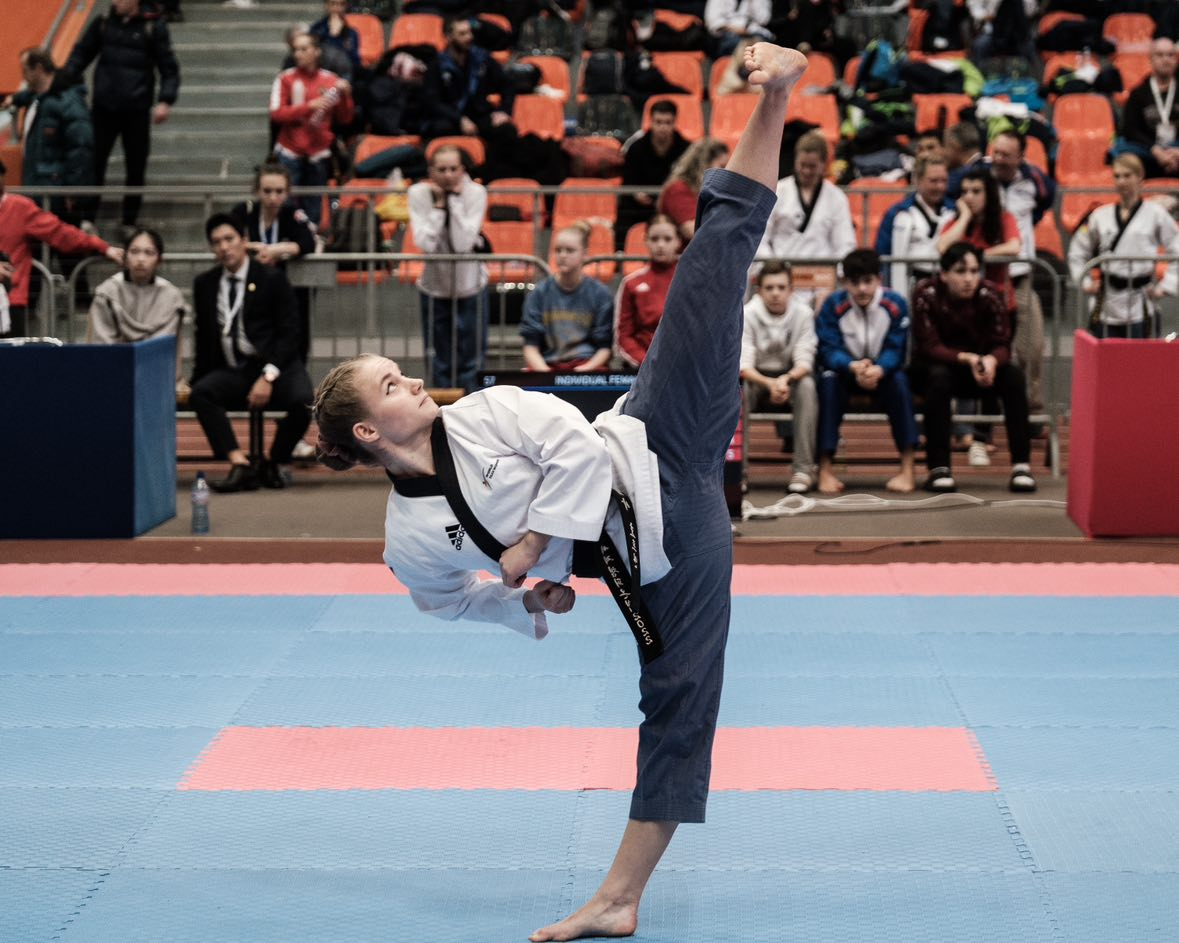
- Pia Hoffmann competing a side kick

Personal information
- Born: 14 September 2006 (age 20) Bensheim, Germany

Sport
- Country: Germany
- Sport: Taekwondo
- Events: Recognized Poomsae; Freestyle Poomsae
- Club: Taekwondo Poomsae Team Bensheim e.V.
- Coached by: Alina Nikonenko

Achievements and titles
- Regional finals: 2nd place, silver medalist(s)
- Highest world ranking: 17 (2025, 2026)
Medal record
Women's Taekwondo
Representing Germany
Senior
European Championships
Silver medal – second place	2023 Innsbruck	Freestyle, team
Silver medal – second place	2025 Tallinn	Poomsae, f under 30
Bronze medal – third place	2025 Tallinn	Freestyle, team
WT President's Cup
Gold medal – first place	2026 London	Poomsae, team
Junior
European Championships
Bronze medal – third place	2023 Innsbruck	Poomsae, f under 17
European Cup
Gold medal – first place	2022 Stockholm	Poomsae, team
Silver medal – second place	2022 Stockholm	Poomsae, f under 17

Pia Hoffmann (born 14 September 2006) is a German taekwondo athlete, four-time European medalist and Vice European Champion in traditional poomsae.

== Career ==
Hoffmann started practising the Korean martial arts taekwondo in 2013 at the age of seven and trained at Bergstrasse Bensheim Taekwondo Club in Hessen, Germany. Since 2025, she trains at Taekwondo Poomsae Team Bensheim, where she is also a coach.

Pia Hoffmann took part in her first international competition in 2019 at the Belgian Open Poomsae in Hasselt, where she won third place in the individual cadet competition in traditional poomsae.

At the 2020 World Championships, she reached the semi-finals with a seventh place in the preliminary round, but did not qualify for the next round due to placing tenth in the semi-finals. The competition was held online due to the COVID-19 pandemic.

In 2022, she took part in the World Poomsae Championships in Goyang, where she placed fifth with Ana Catalina Pohl and Helena Silberhorn in the junior's traditional forms team competition.

At cadet and junior level, Hoffmann became German champion four times, runner-up once, and bronze medallist once. She won her first German senior championship title with the freestyle team in 2022.

At the 2023 European Championships in Innsbruck, Hoffmann won a bronze medal in the individual junior competition and, as part of the mixed team (consisting of five team members, at least two men and two women), a silver medal in the seniors' freestyle competition alongside teammates Ana Catalina Pohl, Leah Lawall, Jules Berger and Julius Müller.

In 2024, Hoffmann competed for the first time as an individual senior at the Bulgaria Open in Sofia and claimed the silver medal in the women's traditional poomsae competition. In 2024, she competed as part of the mixed freestyle team at the World Poomsae Championships in Hong Kong, with which she placed fifth in the semi-finals and ultimately seventh in the final. She also competed in the women's individual poomsae competition, where she lost out to Japanese athlete Akari Shinano and thereby achieved a 17th place.

At the 2025 European Championships, Pia Hoffmann beat Austrian athlete Anna Schneeberger in the semi-finals and thus became Vice European Poomsae Champion in the women's individual competition. She also claimed a bronze medal with the freestyle team.

== Personal life ==
Hoffmann lives with diabetes.

== Tournament record ==
Year	Event	Location	G-Rank	Discipline	Place
2026	Croatia Open	(Croatia) Zagreb	G-1	Poomsae Individual	2nd
2026	Croatia Open	(Croatia) Zagreb	G-1	Poomsae Pair	2nd
2026	Austrian Open	(Austria) Vienna	G-1	Poomsae Team	3rd
2026	WT President's Cup	(United Kingdom) London	G-3	Poomsae Team	1st
2026	London Open	(United Kingdom) London	G-1	Poomsae Individual	2nd
2026	German Open	(Germany) Wiesbaden	G-1	Poomsae Team	3rd
2025	European Championships	(Estonia) Tallinn	G-4	Poomsae Individual	2nd
2025	European Championships	(Estonia) Tallinn	G-4	Freestyle Team	3rd
2025	Belgian Open	(Belgium) Lommel	G-1	Freestyle Team	1st
2024	World Championships	Hong Kong	G-8	Poomsae Individual	17th
2024	World Championships	Hong Kong	G-8	Freestyle Team	7th
2024	Belgian Open	(Belgium) Lommel	G-2	Poomsae Individual	3rd
2024	Austrian Open	(Austria) Vienna	G-1	Freestyle Team	1st
2024	Danish Open	(Denmark) Skanderborg	-	Poomsae Individual	2nd
2024	Bulgaria Open	(Bulgaria) Sofia	G-1	Poomsae Individual	2nd
2023	European Championships	(Austria) Innsbruck	G-4	Poomsae Individual	3rd
2023	European Championships	(Austria) Innsbruck	G-4	Freestyle Team	2nd
2023	French Open	(France) Paris	G-1	Freestyle Team	1st
2023	French Open	(France) Paris	G-1	Poomsae Individual	3rd
2023	German Open	(Germany) Hamburg	-	Freestyle Team	1st
2023	German Open	(Germany) Hamburg	-	Poomsae Individual	1st
2023	Swedish Open	(Sweden) Stockholm	G-1	Poomsae Individual	2nd
2022	World Championships	(South Korea) Goyang	G-8	Poomsae Team	5th
2022	Swedish Open	(Sweden) Stockholm	G-2	Poomsae Individual	2nd
2022	Portugal Open	Portugal	G-2	Poomsae Individual	2nd
2022	Portugal Open	Portugal	G-2	Poomsae Team	1st
2022	Danish Open	(Denmark) Skanderborg	-	Poomsae Individual	1st
2022	Danish Open	(Denmark) Skanderborg	-	Poomsae Team	2nd
2022	European Cup	(Sweden) Stockholm	G-2	Poomsae Individual	2nd
2022	European Cup	(Sweden) Stockholm	G-2	Poomsae Team	1st
2021	Belgian Open	(Belgium) online	G-2	Poomsae Individual	1st
2021	Danish Open	(Denmark) Skanderborg	-	Poomsae Individual	1st
2021	Danish Open	(Denmark) Skanderborg	-	Poomsae Team	1st
2020	World Championships	(South Korea) online	G-2	Poomsae Individual	PAR
2020	Austrian Open	(Austria) Vienna	-	Poomsae Individual	3rd
2020	German Open	(Germany) Hamburg	-	Poomsae Pair	3rd
2019	Belgian Open	(Belgium) Hasselt	G-2	Poomsae Individual	3rd
