= Eva Sandersen =

Danish athlete (born 2001)

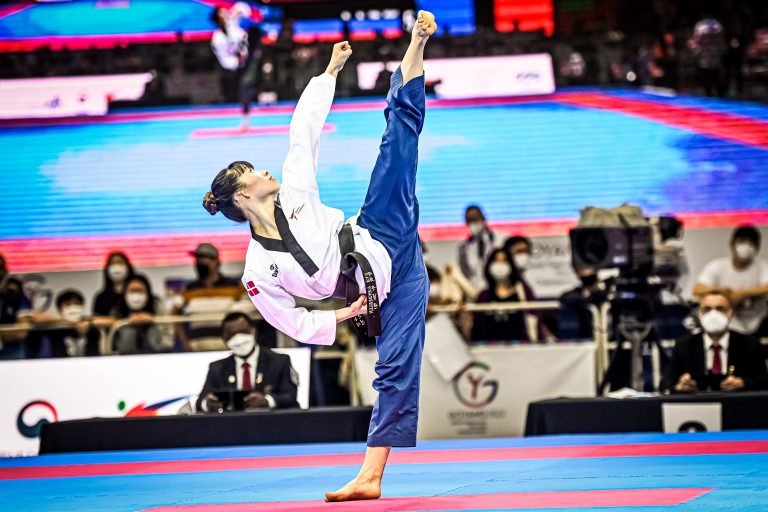
- Sandersen at the 2022 World Championships in Goyang

Personal information
- Full name: Eva Eun-Kyung Sandersen
- Born: 12 February 2001 (age 25)

Sport
- Country: Denmark
- Sport: Taekwondo
- Events: Recognized Poomsae; Freestyle Poomsae
- Club: Gangnam Sportstaekwondo
- Coached by: Bodo Von Münchow; Jacob Dahlslund Buus; Benjamin Harder; Ky-Tu Dang; Kim Drube

Achievements and titles
- World finals: 1st place, gold medalist(s)
- Regional finals: 1st place, gold medalist(s)
- Highest world ranking: 1 (2022-2026)
Medal record
Women's Taekwondo
Representing Denmark
Senior
World Championships
Gold medal – first place	2022 Goyang	Poomsae, f under 30
Silver medal – second place	2024 Hong Kong	Poomsae, f under 30
Silver medal – second place	2024 Hong Kong	Freestyle, f over 17
Bronze medal – third place	2020 Online	Poomsae, f under 30
Bronze medal – third place	2022 Goyang	Freestyle, f over 17
Bronze medal – third place	2026 Chuncheon	Poomsae, f under 30
World University Games
Gold medal – first place	2025 Rhine-Ruhr	Poomsae/Freestyle, Individual
World Taekwondo Poomsae Open Challenge
Gold medal – first place	2021 Online	Poomsae, f under 30
Gold medal – first place	2022 Online	Poomsae, f under 30
Gold medal – first place	2023 Muju	Poomsae, f under 30
European Championships
Gold medal – first place	2019 Antalya	Poomsae, f under 30
Gold medal – first place	2019 Antalya	Freestyle, f over 17
Gold medal – first place	2021 Seixal	Poomsae, f under 30
Gold medal – first place	2021 Seixal	Freestyle, f over 17
Gold medal – first place	2023 Innsbruck	Poomsae, f under 30
Gold medal – first place	2023 Innsbruck	Freestyle, f over 17
Gold medal – first place	2025 Tallinn	Poomsae, f under 30
Gold medal – first place	2025 Tallinn	Freestyle, f over 17
World Beach Championships
Silver medal – second place	2018 Rhodes	Freestyle, f under 30
European Beach Championships
Silver medal – second place	2019 Antalya	Freestyle, f over 17
Junior
World Championships
Silver medal – second place	2016 Lima	Freestyle, f under 17
Bronze medal – third place	2014 Aguascalientes	Poomsae, Team f
Bronze medal – third place	2018 Taipei	Poomsae, f under 17
Bronze medal – third place	2018 Taipei	Freestyle, f under 17
European Championships
Gold medal – first place	2015 Belgrade	Poomsae, f under 15
Gold medal – first place	2015 Belgrade	Freestyle, f under 17
Gold medal – first place	2017 Rhodes	Poomsae, f under 17
Silver medal – second place	2017 Rhodes	Freestyle, f under 17
Bronze medal – third place	2013 La Nucia	Poomsae, f under 14
World Beach Championships
Gold medal – first place	2017 Rhodes	Freestyle, f under 17
Gold medal – first place	2018 Rhodes	Poomsae, f under 17
Silver medal – second place	2017 Rhodes	Poomsae, f under 17

Eva Eun-Kyung Sandersen (Korean: Eva 은경 Sandersen, born 12 February 2001) is a Danish taekwondo athlete, ten-time World Poomsae medalist and eleven-time European Champion.

== Taekwondo career ==
Eva Sandersen started practicing the Korean martial arts taekwondo in 2009 at the suggestion of her parents.

=== Junior competitions ===
Sandersen participated in her first major competition as a junior at the 2014 World Poomsae Championships in Aguascalientes, where she claimed the bronze medal with the female team in the traditional Poomsae competition. At the 2015 European Championships in Belgrade, she placed first in the individual Freestyle as well as the traditional Poomsae Competition.

In 2016, she competed at the World Championships in Lima, where she won a silver medal in the junior's freestyle competition in the age group "under 17" (ages 15 to 17). Additionally, she competed in the junior's Recognized Poomsae competition, where she placed fifth. At this competition, Sandersen also competed alongside teammates Lærke Pedersen and Emma Kayerød-Rasmussenwon in the synchronous-team category, where the group received a fifth place as well.

Sandersen won a gold medal in the junior's Recognized Poomsae competition (ages 15 to 17) at the 2017 Taekwondo European Championships. At the same event, she also earned a second place in the junior's freestyle competition.

In 2018, Sandersen participated in the World Taekwondo Poomsae Championships, where she earned two bronze medals, one in the Recognized Poomsae competition and one in the Freestyle Poomsae competition for the age group from 15 to 17 years. That same year, she won the gold medal in the Recognized Poomsae competition at the 2018 World Taekwondo Beach Championships.

=== Senior competitions ===
Sandersen participated in her first senior competition in 2018, at the World Taekwondo Beach Championships in Rhodes, where she had also competed as a Junior in the Recognized Poomsae competition, and claimed the silver medal in the women's Freestyle Poomsae competition.

2019, at the European Poomsae Championships in Antalya, she became double-European champion in the women's Recognized Poomsae and freestyle competition. In February 2020, Sandersen ruptured an Achilles tendon during a training session and had to take a break from competing for six months.

At the end of 2020, she won her first major senior medal on the international stage at the World Poomsae Championships, where she claimed one of the bronze medals of the single-elimination tournament. The competition was held online due to the COVID-19 pandemic.

In 2021, Sandersen won two gold medals, in both the traditional poomsae category and the freestyle category of the women's senior competition (over 17 years of age) at the 15th European Poomsae Championships in Seixal.

At the Goyang 2022 World Taekwondo Poomsae Championships, she became the world champion in the women's Recognized Poomsae competition (ages 18 to 30), after beating Marjan Salahshouri in the finale. Additionally, Sandersen won the bronze medal in the women's Freestyle Poomsae competition.

Sandersen became European Champion for the third time at the 2023 European Championships in Innsbruck, beating Sweden's Alicia Brännback in the semi-final and Turkish athlete Seyda Nur Yavuz in the final of the Recognized Poomsae competition, with Austria's Anna Schneeberger taking the second bronze medal. Additionally, she beat Germany's Leah Lawall in the finale and took first place in the women's freestyle competition for the third time.

In 2024, she participated in the women's individual freestyle competition at the World Poomsae Championships in Hong Kong, where she placed second behind the defending freestyle world champion Ye Eun Cha from South Korea. She also claimed the silver medal in the women's Recognized Poomsae competition behind South Korean athlete Jooyeong Lee.

== Public appearances ==
Sandersen participated in the fifth and final season of Danmark Har Talent in November 2019. She performed several programs consisting of taekwondo moves combined with stunt elements. Sandersen advanced into the finals but missed out on the Top 5, finishing in the 6th to 10th ranking. In an interview with German athlete Steven Behn in 2023, she stated that she would like to see Poomsae competitions being included in the Olympic Games.

== Personal life ==
Sandersen began studying for a degree in Pharmaceutical Sciences in 2021.
