= Jules Berger =

German athlete (born 2001)

Personal information
- Born: 26 April 2002 (age 24)

Sport
- Country: Germany
- Sport: Taekwondo
- Event: Freestyle Poomsae
- Club: KSG Taepoong Germany e.V.
- Coached by: Nicole Ketteniss

Achievements and titles
- Regional finals: 2nd place, silver medalist(s)
- Highest world ranking: 15 (2024)
Medal record
Men's Taekwondo
Representing Germany
Senior
European Championships
Silver medal – second place	2023 Innsbruck	Freestyle, team over 12
Bronze medal – third place	2023 Innsbruck	Freestyle, m over 17

Jules Berger (born 26 April 2002) is a German taekwondo athlete and two time European medalist in freestyle poomsae.

== Taekwondo career ==
Jules Berger started practicing the Korean martial arts taekwondo in 2007, after he had first tried out soccer. He attended his first classes at Aita Budo Sports in Mommenheim and then trained at Taepung TKD Rheinhessen until 2019. He switched clubs to KSG Taepoong Germany in 2019 and has been a member of the German national team since that same year. Berger is also a state judge in Baden-Württemberg.

In 2019, Berger participated in his first international tournament, the Austrian Open Poomsae in Vienna, where he took first place in the junior's individual freestyle competition. At the 2021 European Poomsae Championships in Seixal, Berger placed 8th in the senior's freestyle competition. In 2022, he took part in the individual freestyle competition at the World Poomsae Championships in Goyang, narrowly missing the finale.

Berger competed at the 2021 University Games in Chengdu and placed 10th with the men's team in traditional poomsae. At the 2023 European Championships in Innsbruck, Berger won a bronze medal in the individual freestyle competition and, as part of the mixed team (consisting of five team members, at least two men and two women), a silver medal in the seniors' freestyle competition alongside teammates Pia Hoffmann, Ana Catalina Pohl, Leah Lawall and Julius Müller.
