= Taekwondo at the 2019 Pan American Games – Women's poomsae individual =

Women's individual poomsae at the 2019 Pan American Games
- Venue: Polideportivo Callao
- Dates: July 27
- Competitors: 7 from 7 nations
- Winning score: 7.660

Medalists
Gold medal	Paula Fregoso	Mexico
Silver medal	Marcella Castillo	Peru
Bronze medal	Karyn Real	United States
Bronze medal	Claudia Cardenas	Ecuador

The women's individual poomsae competition of the taekwondo events at the 2019 Pan American Games took place on July 27 at the Polideportivo Callao.

== Results ==
Position	Athlete	Round 1	Round 2	Total (average)
1st place, gold medalist(s)	Paula Fregoso (MEX)	7.52	7.80	7.660
2nd place, silver medalist(s)	Marcella Castillo (PER)	7.50	7.56	7.530
3rd place, bronze medalist(s)	Karyn Real (USA)	7.48	7.54	7.510
3rd place, bronze medalist(s)	Claudia Cardenas (ECU)	7.22	7.20	7.210
5	Arelis Medina (PUR)	7.28	7.14	7.210
6	Valerie Ho (CAN)	7.06	6.96	7.010
7	Maria Eufragio (GUA)	6.84	6.68	6.760
