= Carmina Presinszky =

Austrian athlete (born 1994)

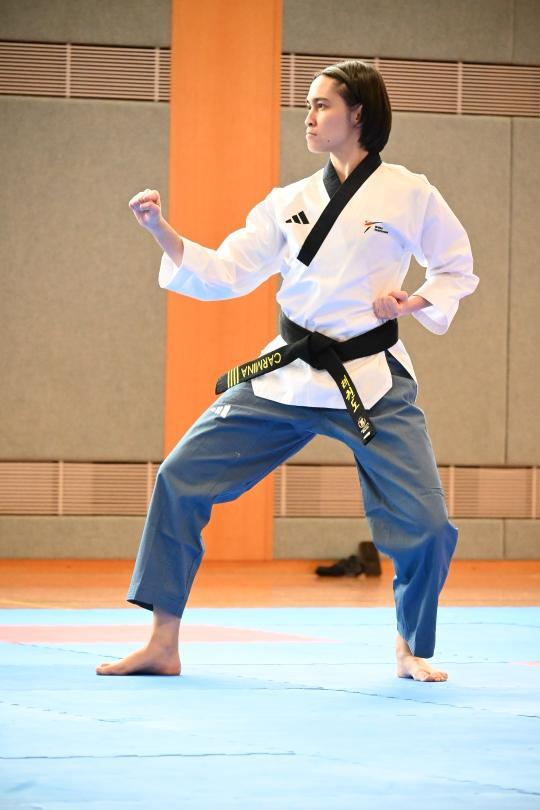
- Carmina Presinszky at national team training

Personal information
- Born: 30 October 1994 (age 31)

Sport
- Country: Austria
- Sport: Taekwondo
- Events: Recognized Poomsae –49 kg
- Club: Kampfkunstschule DOJANG Wien
- Coached by: Peter Nestler

Achievements and titles
- Regional finals: 3rd place, bronze medalist(s)
- Highest world ranking: 5 (2026)
Medal record
Women's Taekwondo
Representing Austria
WT President's Cup
Gold medal – first place	2026 London	Poomsae, f under 40
Silver medal – second place	2025 Innsbruck	Poomsae, f under 40
European Club Championships
Bronze medal – third place	2018 Marina d'Or	Poomsae, f under 30
Bronze medal – third place	2023 Sofia	Poomsae, f under 30

Carmina Presinszky (born 30 October 1994) is an Austrian taekwondo athlete and two-time European bronze medalist.

== Taekwondo career ==
Carmina Presinszky's sporting career began in 1999 at the age of five in Šamorín, Slovakia, where she initially learned karate from Attila Horváth until 2005. Since 2010, Presinszky has been training in the Korean martial art of taekwondo in Vienna with Austrian martial artist and international referee Peter Nestler. Since 2011, she has successfully participated in international junior tournaments and won first place in the junior class at both the Serbia Open Poomsae and the Hungarian Open Poomsae in her debut year.

From 2013 onwards, Presinszky achieved her first successes in international poomsae competitions. In 2014, she won the Austrian national championship title in Innsbruck in the poomsae team competition (three-person synchronized team) together with Anna Schneeberger and Anita Schermer. She won her first medal in Olympic sparring (“kyorugi”) in 2015 at the Kaiserwinkl Open in Tyrol. In the same year, she won the Austrian national championship title in Vienna in the Olympic weight class up to 49 kilograms.

Presinszky took part in the poomsae competitions in 2017 and 2024 as well as in both the poomsae and kyorugi contests (up to 49 kg) in 2019 at the European Universities Games. She placed fifth in kyorugi.

In 2018 and 2023, she competed for her club at the European Club Championships and in both competitions won a bronze medal in the women's individual poomsae competition. In 2025, she won a gold medal at the Austrian Open Poomsae in Vienna in the women's individual competition up to 40 years of age, becoming the first Austrian poomsae athlete to win a gold medal at a world ranking tournament (‘G rank tournament’). At the 2025 European Poomsae Championships in Tallinn, she finished 5th in the women's under 40 category, and in the same year she won a silver medal at the world ranking tournament ‘President's Cup’ in Innsbruck. This earned her 19th place in the world rankings for women 30 to 40 years of age in January 2026, putting her in the top 20 in this ranking for the first time.

At the 2026 WT President's Cup, she claimed the gold medal, making her the first Austrian taekwondo athlete to win a G3-level taekwondo tournament.

== Personal life ==
Carmina Presinszky completed a bachelor's degree in education for the subjects of history and physical education at the University of Vienna.

In March 2025, she took up a position as a consultant for sports at the Austrian Olympic Committee (ÖOC). Presinszky has a coaching licence and has also been secretary as well as board member of the Vienna Taekwondo Association since September 2024.

== Tournament record ==
Year	Event	Location	G-Rank	Discipline	Place
2026	Austrian Open	(Austria) Vienna	G-1	Poomsae Individual	2nd
2026	WT President's Cup	(United Kingdom) London	G-3	Poomsae Individual	1st
2026	London Open	(United Kingdom) London	G-1	Poomsae Individual	1st
2026	Skopje Open Ramus	(North Macedonia) Skopje	G-1	Poomsae Individual	3rd
2025	WT President's Cup	(Austria) Innsbruck	G-3	Poomsae Individual	2nd
2025	European Championships	(Estonia) Tallinn	G-4	Poomsae Individual	5th
2025	Austrian Open	(Austria) Vienna	G-1	Poomsae Individual	1st
2023	European Club Championships	(Bulgaria) Sofia	G-1	Poomsae Individual	3rd
2018	European Club Championships	(Spain) Marina d'Or	G-1	Poomsae Individual	3rd
