= Anna Schneeberger =

Austrian athlete (born 1999)

Personal information
- Born: 15 December 1999 (age 26)

Sport
- Country: Austria
- Sport: Taekwondo
- Event: Recognized Poomsae
- Club: Taekwondo Verein Wörgl
- Coached by: Daniel Pirchmoser

Achievements and titles
- Regional finals: 3rd place, bronze medalist(s)
- Highest world ranking: 5 (2026)
Medal record
Women's Taekwondo
Representing Austria
European Championships
Bronze medal – third place	2023 Innsbruck	Poomsae, f under 30
European Universities Combat Championships
Gold medal – first place	2023 Zagreb	Poomsae, f under 30

Anna Schneeberger (born 15 December 1999) is an Austrian taekwondo athlete and European bronze medalist.

== Career ==
Anna Schneeberger started practising the Korean martial art taekwondo at the age of six and trains at Taekwondo Verein Wörgl.

In 2016, she took part in her first international competition, the Austrian Open Poomsae, where she came third in the junior women's individual poomsae competition. She participated in the European Championships in 2017 and 2019 and the World Championships in 2020.

In 2023, she claimed first place in the women's individual competition at the European Universities Combat Championships in Zagreb. At the 2023 European Poomsae Championships in Innsbruck, Schneeberger beat Germany in the quarter-finals and lost to Şeyda Nur Yavuz from Turkey in the semi-finals, thus winning a bronze medal in the women's traditional poomsae competition. She placed 5th in the women's individual poomsae competition at the 2024 World Poomsae Championships in Hong Kong, and, alongside fellow national team member Carmina Presinszky, participated in the 2025 European Poomsae championships in Tallinn, where she also achieved a 5th place.
