= Julius Müller (taekwondo) =

German athlete (born 2006)

Personal information
- Born: Wiesbaden

Sport
- Country: Germany
- Sport: Taekwondo
- Event: Freestyle Poomsae
- Club: Budo-Schule Wiesbaden
- Coached by: Kai Müller

Achievements and titles
- Regional finals: 2nd place, silver medalist(s)
Medal record
Men's Taekwondo
Representing Germany
Senior
European Championships
Silver medal – second place	2023 Innsbruck	Freestyle, team
Bronze medal – third place	2025 Tallinn	Freestyle, team
Junior
US Pan Am Series
Gold medal – first place	2022 Fort Worth	Freestyle, pairs
Silver medal – second place	2022 Fort Worth	Freestyle, m under 17

Julius Müller (born 2005) is a German taekwondo athlete and two-time European poomsae medalist.

== Career ==
Julius Müller practises the Korean martial art of taekwondo at the Budo School Wiesbaden in Hesse. He is a coach and head of the Freestyle regional base of the Hessian Taekwondo Union.

In 2019, Müller took part in his first international tournament, the Turkish Open Poomsae in Istanbul, where he took second place in the junior freestyle pairs competition. In the same year, he competed in the freestyle pairs category at the European Poomsae Championships in Antalya.

At the 2021 European Poomsae Championships in Seixal, he finished 7th in the junior freestyle competition and 5th in the freestyle pairs competition together with Adina Machwirth. In 2022, he won the freestyle pairs division of the US Pan Am Series I as a team with Adina Machwirth, and also finished second in the individual freestyle competition.

As part of the mixed team (consisting of five team members, at least two men and two women), Müller won the silver medal in the freestyle team competition at the 2023 European Championships in Innsbruck, alongside Pia Hoffmann, Ana Catalina Pohl, Leah Lawall and Jules Berger. At the 2025 European Championships held in Tallinn, he won a bronze medal with the German freestyle team.
