= Pierre-Malo Tranchant =

French taekwondo athlete (born 2002)

- Born: 7 February 2002 (age 24); Paris, France
- Team: Moohan Team
- Years active: 2009–present

Other information
- University: Université Paris Nanterre; Grenoble École de Management
- Notable club: Taekwondo Vincennes

Pierre-Malo Tranchant
Medal record

Representing France

Men's taekwondo poomsae

European Championships
Gold medal – first place	2025 Tallinn	Individual, m under 30
Bronze medal – third place	2025 Tallinn	Team
Silver medal – second place	2023 Innsbruck	Individual, m under 30
Bronze medal – third place	2021 Seixal	Pair

European University Championships
Gold medal – first place	2025 Warsaw	Poomsae
Silver medal – second place	2025 Warsaw	Freestyle
Bronze medal – third place	2024 Debrecen-Miskolc	Poomsae

International Opens
Gold medal – first place	2024 Belgian Open (G2)	Individual
Gold medal – first place	2023 Bulgarian Open (G2)	Individual
Silver medal – second place	2024 Austrian Open (G1)	Individual
Bronze medal – third place	2024 Canada Open, Vancouver (G2)	Individual

Pierre-Malo Tranchant (born 7 February 2002) is a French taekwondo athlete specializing in poomsae. He is the 2025 European Poomsae Champion in the men's under-30 individual category and is ranked 4th in the world as of 2025. A member of the France national taekwondo team since 2015, he trains at INSEP in Paris. He holds the rank of 4th Dan from the Kukkiwon.

== Early life and beginnings ==
Pierre-Malo began practicing taekwondo at 7 at the club Taekwondo Vincennes, under the coaching of Mathieu Stehlin (6th Dan). He specialized in poomsae within his first year of training and was selected for the French national poomsae team in 2015, at the age of 13.

== Career ==
=== National career ===
Pierre-Malo is a 9-time individual French poomsae champion, with over 15 gold medals at the French Taekwondo Championships across individual, pair, team, and freestyle categories.

=== International career ===
Pierre-Malo first represented France at the European Poomsae Championships in 2019 in Antalya, Turkey. At the 2021 European Poomsae Championships in Seixal, Portugal, he won a bronze medal in the pair category alongside Amélie Leang.

He represented France at the 2022 World Poomsae Championships in Goyang, South Korea, and returned to the World Championships in 2024 in Hong Kong.

In 2023, he won the silver medal at the European Poomsae Championships in Innsbruck, Austria, in the men's individual under-30 category. That same year, he reached the final at the World University Games in Chengdu, China, and won gold at the Bulgarian Open (G2 event).

The 2024 season saw Pierre-Malo compete on the international open circuit, winning gold at the Belgian Open (G2), silver at the Austrian Open (G1), and bronze at the Canada Open in Vancouver (G2). He also earned a bronze medal at the European University Poomsae Championships in Debrecen–Miskolc, Hungary.

At the 2025 European Poomsae Championships in Tallinn, Estonia, Pierre-Malo won the gold medal in the men's individual under-30 recognized poomsae event, ahead of Dutch athlete Joël van der Weide. He also won a bronze medal in the team event alongside Mathys Thiramany and Tristan Hery. Later in 2025, he won gold in poomsae and silver in freestyle at the European University Championships in Warsaw, Poland. He also competed at the 2025 Summer World University Games, finishing 5th.

== Television ==
In 2021, Pierre-Malo appeared on the television show La France a un incroyable talent on M6.

== Education ==
Pierre-Malo holds a degree in sport management (STAPS) from Paris Nanterre University and is pursuing a specialization in sport business at Grenoble École de Management.
