= Leah Lawall =

German athlete (born 2003)

Personal information
- Born: 6 January 2003 (age 23)

Sport
- Country: Germany
- Sport: Taekwondo
- Events: Freestyle Poomsae; Recognized Poomsae
- Club: Taekwondo Team Fuhlsbüttel e. V.
- Coached by: Matthias Behn, Steven Behn

Achievements and titles
- World finals: 3rd place, bronze medalist(s)
- Regional finals: 2nd place, silver medalist(s)
- Highest world ranking: 7 (2024, 2025)
Medal record
Women's Taekwondo
Representing Germany
Senior
European Championships
Silver medal – second place	2023 Innsbruck	Freestyle, f over 17
Silver medal – second place	2023 Innsbruck	Freestyle, team over 12
Bronze medal – third place	2025 Tallinn	Freestyle, f over 17
Bronze medal – third place	2025 Tallinn	Freestyle, team over 17
World University Games
Bronze medal – third place	2025 Rhine-Ruhr	Poomsae/Freestyle, Team
European Universities Games
Gold medal – first place	2022 Łódź	Freestyle, f over 17
European Universities Combat Championships
Gold medal – first place	2023 Zagreb	Freestyle, f over 17
Junior
European Championships
Silver medal – second place	2019 Antalya	Freestyle, f under 17
European Beach Championships
Silver medal – second place	2019 Antalya	Freestyle, f under 17

Leah Lawall (born 6 January 2003) is a German taekwondo athlete and five-time European poomsae medalist.

== Career ==
Leah Lawall started practicing the Korean martial arts taekwondo in 2009. Her taekwondo club had offered a class at her primary school, which she took part in and subsequently officially registered with her club.

=== Junior competitions ===
Lawall participated in her first major international competition as a junior at the 2017 Taekwondo European Championships in Rhodes, where she placed seventh in the freestyle team competition.

In 2018, Lawall participated in the World Taekwondo Poomsae Championships in Taipei and placed seventh with the junior's team competition in traditional poomsae.

She became Vice European champion in the junior's Freestyle Poomsae competition (ages 15 to 17) at the 2019 Taekwondo European Championships in Antalya. That same year, she also earned a silver medal at the European Beach Championships.

=== Senior competitions ===
In 2021, Lawall competed at the European Poomsae Championships in Seixal, Portugal, and placed fifth in the freestyle category of the women's senior competition (over 17 years of age). She claimed the gold medal in the women's freestyle competition at the 2022 European Universities Games. In 2023, she earned another gold medal in the women's freestyle competition at the European Universities Combat Championships, held in Zagreb.

At the 2023 European Poomsae Championships in Innsbruck, Lawall lost to Eva Sandersen and thus became Vice-European Champion in the individual freestyle competition and, as part of the mixed team (consisting of five team members, at least two men and two women), won an additional silver medal in the seniors' freestyle competition alongside teammates Pia Hoffmann. Ana Catalina Pohl, Julius Müller and Jules Berger. In 2024, she competed as part of the mixed freestyle team at the World Poomsae Championships in Hong Kong, with which she placed fifth in the semi-finals and ultimately seventh in the final. She reached the final in the women's individual freestyle competition where she also placed seventh.

At the 2025 European Championships held in Tallinn, she won a bronze medal with the German freestyle team as well as an individual bronze in the women's freestyle competition.

== Personal life ==
Lawall is studying Sport Science at the German Sport University Cologne.
