= Anna Monika Siepmann =

German athlete (born 2004)

Personal information
- Born: 26 January 2004 (age 22) Witten
- Education: Bochum University of Applied Sciences

Sport
- Country: Germany
- Sport: Taekwondo
- Event: Recognized Poomsae

Achievements and titles
- World finals: 3rd place, bronze medalist(s)
- Regional finals: 2nd place, silver medalist(s)
Medal record
Women's Taekwondo
Representing Germany
Senior
World University Games
Bronze medal – third place	2025 Rhine-Ruhr	Poomsae/Freestyle, team
European Championships
Bronze medal – third place	2025 Tallinn	Poomsae, team
WT President's Cup
Gold medal – first place	2025 Innsbruck	Poomsae, team
Bronze medal – third place	2026 London	Poomsae, team
Junior
European Championships
Silver medal – second place	2019 Antalya	Poomsae, team
Bronze medal – third place	2021 Seixal	Poomsae, individual
Bronze medal – third place	2021 Seixal	Poomsae, pair
WT President's Cup
Gold medal – first place	2019 Sindelfingen	Poomsae, team
Bronze medal – third place	2019 Sindelfingen	Poomsae, individual

Anna Monika Siepmann (born 26 January 2004) is a German taekwondo poomsae athlete and five-time European medalist.

== Career ==
Anna Siepmann began training in the Korean martial art of taekwondo in 2010 at the age of six, originally for self-defence training. She has been part of the German national team since 2018. In 2018, she took part in the poomsae World Championships held in Taipei. As part of the junior team, Siepmann became vice European champion in the team competition (three-person female team) at the European Championships in Antalya in 2019.

In 2021, Siepmann took part in the European Championships in Seixal, Portugal, winning a bronze medal in the junior women's individual competition in traditional forms and another bronze medal in pairs (a boy and a girl in a team of two) alongside her team-mate Tung-Duong Tim Do.

At cadet and junior level, Siepmann became German champion seven times, runner-up five times and bronze medallist twice. Since competing as a senior, she has been German champion three times. At the 2023 European Championships in Innsbruck, Siepmann competed in the senior pairs event together with Tung-Duong Tim Do. They qualified in third place and finished sixth in the final.

In December 2024, she competed as part of the female three-person team in traditional poomsae at the World Poomsae Championships in Hong Kong, with which she placed seventh. At the 2025 European Championships held in Tallinn, she competed as part of the German three-person poomsae team in the women's 18 to 30 age class and, after beating Serbia in the quarter-finals, won a bronze medal.

== Personal life ==
Siepmann was appointed state coach for traditional poomsae of the Lower Saxony Taekwondo Union in 2024.

== Tournament record ==
Year	Event	Location	G-Rank	Discipline	Place
2026	WT President's Cup	(United Kingdom) London	G-3	Poomsae Team	3rd
2025	WT President's Cup	(Austria) Innsbruck	G-3	Poomsae Team	1st
2025	FISU World University Games	(Germany) Essen	G-4	Poomsae Team	3rd
2025	European Championships	(Estonia) Tallinn	G-4	Poomsae Team	3rd
2024	World Championships	Hong Kong	G-8	Poomsae Team	7th
2023	European Championships	(Austria) Innsbruck	G-4	Poomsae Pair	6th
2021	European Championships	(Portugal) Seixal	G-4	Poomsae Individual	3rd
2021	European Championships	(Portugal) Seixal	G-4	Poomsae Pair	3rd
2019	European Championships	(Turkey) Antalya	G-4	Poomsae Team	2nd
2019	European Championships	(Turkey) Antalya	G-4	Poomsae Individual	n. a.
2018	World Championships	(Chinese Taipei) Taipei	G-8	Poomsae Individual	n. a.
