= Michael Bussmann =

German athlete (born 1972)

- Michael Bussmann in competition in 2025

Personal information
- Born: 6 September 1972 (age 54)

Sport
- Country: Germany
- Sport: Taekwondo
- Event: Recognized Poomsae
- Club: Polizeisportverein Eichstätt e.V.

Achievements and titles
- World finals: 1st place, gold medalist(s)
- Regional finals: 1st place, gold medalist(s)
Medal record
Men's Taekwondo
Representing Germany
Senior
World Championships
Gold medal – first place	2010 Tashkent	Poomsae, pair
Gold medal – first place	2011 Vladivostok	Poomsae, pair
Silver medal – second place	2024 Hong Kong	Poomsae, pair
Bronze medal – third place	2014 Aguascalientes	Poomsae, m<50
World Taekwondo Hanmadang
Silver medal – second place	2015 Pyeongtaek	Poomsae, m<50
WT President's Cup
Gold medal – first place	2026 London	Poomsae, m<60
Gold medal – first place	2025 Innsbruck	Poomsae, m<60
European Championships
Gold medal – first place	2025 Tallinn	Poomsae, pair
Silver medal – second place	2015 Belgrade	Poomsae, m<50
Silver medal – second place	2019 Antalya	Poomsae, m<50
Bronze medal – third place	2011 Genua	Poomsae, pair
Bronze medal – third place	2013 Alicante	Poomsae, m<49
Bronze medal – third place	2015 Belgrade	Poomsae, team
Bronze medal – third place	2017 Rhodes	Poomsae, m<50
Bronze medal – third place	2017 Rhodes	Poomsae, team
Bronze medal – third place	2025 Tallinn	Poomsae, m<60

Michael Bussmann (born September 6, 1972, German spelling: Michael Bußmann) is a German taekwondo athlete and two-time World Champion in traditional poomsae.

== Taekwondo career ==
Michael Bußmann began training in the Korean martial art of taekwondo in 1989, having previously trained in judo and jujutsu. Bußmann has been a member of the German national team for poomsae since 2006. Since 2004, he has been German champion a total of eight times and has also won seven silver and three bronze medals at all-together eleven German championships.

At the 2010 Poomsae World Championships in Tashkent, Bußmann took first place in the pairs competition, becoming world champion for the first time. In 2011 in Vladivostok, he successfully defended this title in the same discipline. In Aguascalientes in 2014, Bußmann won his first World Championship medal in an individual discipline with a bronze medal in the men's under 50 years competition.

In 2011, Bußmann won his first medal at the European Championships in Genoa – a bronze medal in the pairs competition. In 2013, he won his first European Championship medal in an individual competition in Alicante: a bronze medal in the men's under 49 years competition. From 2011 to 2025, Bußmann won six bronze medals, two silver medals and one gold medal at all in all six European Championships.

In 2013, Michael Bußmann passed the Kukkiwon's 7th Dan examination. In 2015, he won a silver medal at the World Taekwondo Hanmadang, an international taekwondo festival featuring performances and competitions. It is highly regarded within the taekwondo community and, among other things, allows medal winners to shorten the waiting times between Dan examinations. In 2018, Bußmann passed the German Taekwondo Union's 8th Dan examination.

In 2024, Bußmann and Heekyung Reimann became vice world champions in the pairs competition in the under 60 years age group at the World Championships in Hong Kong. At the 2025 European Championships in Tallinn, he became European champion for the first time in the same class in pairs skating with Reimann. He also won a bronze medal in the men's singles competition in the 60+ age group.

== Personal life ==
Michael Bußmann was Vice President for Amateur Sports at the German Taekwondo Union (DTU) from 2012 to 2016 and was elected again in 2025. He has also been a member of the Executive Board of the Referee Committee of the World Combative Taekwondo Union (WCTU) since 2013, State Coach for poomsae at the Bavarian Taekwondo Union (BTU) since 2007, and Head of the taekwondo division of the Eichstätt Police Sports Club (Polizeisportverein Eichstätt e.V.) since 2001. He is married to fellow taekwondo athlete Angelika Bußmann, who is also a European medalist.
