= Alicia Brännback =

Swedish athlete (born 2000)

Personal information
- Born: 28 August 2000 (age 25)

Sport
- Country: Sweden
- Sport: Taekwondo
- Event: Recognized Poomsae
- Club: Västerås Taekwondoklubb, Poomsae Team Elite Sweden
Medal record
Women's Taekwondo
Representing Sweden
European Championships
Bronze medal – third place	2023 Innsbruck	Poomsae, f under 30
Bronze medal – third place	2025 Tallinn	Poomsae, f under 30
Bronze medal – third place	2025 Tallinn	Poomsae, pair under 30
European Beach Championships
Silver medal – second place	Antalya 2019	Poomsae, f under 30

Alicia Brännback (born 28 August 2000) is a Swedish taekwondo athlete and three-time European bronze medalist in traditional poomsae.

== Career ==
Brännback started practising the Korean martial art of taekwondo at the age of five and participated in her first international competition in 2015. As a junior, she competed in the European Championships in 2015 and the World Championships in 2016. In 2017, she placed 6th at the World Championships in the pairs competition (one boy and one girl) in traditional poomsae. In 2018, she started competing as a senior and participated in the World Championships in Taipei.

In 2019, she competed in the European Beach Championships in Antalya and won the silver medal in the women's traditional pumsae competition. She participated in the 2020 World Championships and the 2021 European Championships.

Brännback won the silver medal in the first Taekwondo Poomsae European Cup in 2022 and thus qualified for the European Championships in 2023. In 2023, after losing to Denmark's Eva Sandersen in the semi-finals, she claimed a bronze medal in the women's Recognized Poomsae competition at the European Championships in Innsbruck. In 2025 in Tallinn, Brännback won a second European bronze at the 2025 European Championships.
