= Marjan Salahshouri =

Iranian taekwondo practitioner

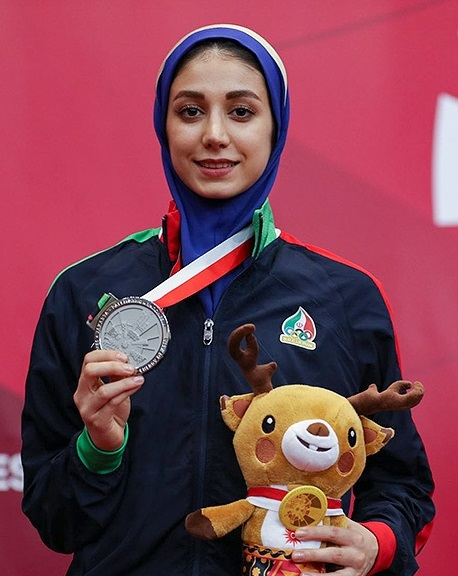
- Salahshouri in 2018

Personal information
- Nationality: Iranian
- Born: 12 October 1996 (age 29) Isfahan, Iran
- Education: Chemistry; SCU Ahvaz
- Height: 1.60 m (5 ft 3 in)

Sport
- Country: Iran
- Sport: Taekwondo
- Events: Poomsae, Freestyle Poomsae
Medal record
Representing Iran
Women's taekwondo
Senior
World Championships
Silver medal – second place	2013 Bali	Poomsae, pairs
Silver medal – second place	2022 Goyang	Poomsae, f under 30
Bronze medal – third place	2016 Lima	Poomsae, f under 30
Bronze medal – third place	2016 Lima	Freestyle, team f
Asian Games
Silver medal – second place	2018 Jakarta	Poomsae, f under 30
Bronze medal – third place	2022 Hangzhou	Poomsae, f under 30
Asian Championships
Gold medal – first place	2013 Jakarta	Poomsae, f under 30
Gold medal – first place	2013 Jakarta	Poomsae, pairs
Gold medal – first place	2014 Tashkent	Poomsae, f under 30
Silver medal – second place	2018 Ho Chi Minh City	Poomsae, f under 30
Silver medal – second place	2021 Beireut	Poomsae, f under 30
Silver medal – second place	2021 Beireut	Freestyle, team f
Silver medal – second place	2022 Chuncheon	Poomsae, f under 30
Bronze medal – third place	2018 Ho Chi Minh City	Freestyle, team f
World University Games
Bronze medal – third place	2015 Gwangju	Poomsae, team f
Bronze medal – third place	2019 Naples	Freestyle, team f
Bronze medal – third place	2019 Naples	Poomsae, pairs
Asian Indoor and Martial Arts Games
Gold medal – first place	2017 Ashgabat	Poomsae, f under 30
Bronze medal – third place	2017 Ashgabat	Poomsae, team f
Junior
World Championships
Gold medal – first place	2013 Bali	Poomsae, f under 17
Asian Championships
Gold medal – first place	2012 Ho Chi Ming City	Poomsae, f under 17
Gold medal – first place	2012 Ho Chi Ming City	Freestyle, team f
Silver medal – second place	2013 Bali	Poomsae, pairs

Marjan Salahshouri (Persian: مرجان سلحشوری, born 12 October 1996) is an Iranian taekwondo practitioner.

She represented Iran at the 2018 and 2022 Asian Games, claiming a silver medal and a bronze medal in the women's poomsae individual event.

Salahshouri became vice-champion in the pairs' traditional Poomsae competition at the 2013 World Taekwondo Championships. She also claimed a bronze medal in the women's individual competition as well as a second bronze medal in the women's team competition (three-person team) at the 2016 World Championships held in Lima.

At the Goyang 2022 World Taekwondo Poomsae Championships, she beat American athlete Kaitlyn Reclusado in the semi-finale, lost to Denmark's Eva Sandersen in the finale and thus became vice-champion in the women's Recognized Poomsae senior competition (ages 18 to 30).
