= Ryan Real =

American athlete (born 2003)

Personal information
- Born: June 10, 2003 (age 23) Diamond Bar, California, U.S.
- Height: 5 ft 8 in (173 cm)

Sport
- Country: United States
- Sport: Taekwondo
- Event(s): Recognized Poomsae, Freestyle Poomsae
- Club: Team Eagles Taekwondo

Achievements and titles
- World finals: 2nd place, silver medalist(s)
- Regional finals: 1st place, gold medalist(s)
- Highest world ranking: 1 (2022–2025)
Medal record
Men's Taekwondo
Representing United States
Senior
World Championships
Silver medal – second place	2024 Hong Kong	Poomsae, m under 30
Bronze medal – third place	2022 Goyang	Poomsae, m under 30
Pan American Championships
Gold medal – first place	2022 Punta Cana	Poomsae, m under 30
Gold medal – first place	2022 Punta Cana	Poomsae, pair
Gold medal – first place	2024 Rio de Janeiro	Poomsae, pair
Gold medal – first place	2026 Rio de Janeiro	Poomsae, pair
Bronze medal – third place	2024 Rio de Janeiro	Poomsae, m under 30
World Beach Championships
Gold medal – first place	2023 Chuncheon	Poomsae, pair
Junior
World Championships
Bronze medal – third place	2016 Lima	Poomsae, team m
Bronze medal – third place	2018 Taipeh	Poomsae, m under 17
Pan American Championships
Gold medal – first place	2015 Aguascalientes	Poomsae, m under 15
Gold medal – first place	2017 San Jose	Poomsae, m under 17
Gold medal – first place	2017 San Jose	33 kg
Gold medal – first place	2019 Portland	Poomsae, m under 17
Gold medal – first place	2019 Portland	Poomsae, team m
Silver medal – second place	2015 Aguascalientes	Poomsae, pair
Silver medal – second place	2017 San Jose	Poomsae, team m
Silver medal – second place	2020 online	Poomsae, m under 17

Ryan Real (born June 10, 2003) is an American taekwondo athlete and two-time world medalist in traditional Poomsae.

== Career ==
Ryan Real started practising the Korean martial arts taekwondo in 2007 and began competing internationally in 2013 at the US Open. Real won his first major international medal at the 2016 World Poomsae Championships in Lima, where he placed third with the cadet's male team (three person team) in traditional poomsae. He also placed fifth in the individual competition.

In 2016 and 2017, Real competed in several kyorugi competitions. He placed first in the cadet's 33 kg weight class at the 2017 Pan American Championships in San José. At the 2018 World Championships held in Taipei, he won a bronze medal in the individual poomsae competition. With the junior's male team, he placed fifth at these championships.

Real participated in the 2022 World Championships in Goyang and won a bronze medal at the men's Recognized Poomsae senior competition (ages 18 to 30). He also competed in the pair's competition alongside his sister Karyn Real, where the pair placed fifth.

At the 2023 World Beach Championships in Chuncheon, he and Karyn Real won the gold medal in the pair's traditional poomsae competition. In 2024, he competed at the World Poomsae Championships in Hong Kong, where he won silver in the men's individual traditional poomsae competition.

== Personal life ==
Real is a student at the University of Pennsylvania, pursuing a Bachelor's degree in Mechanical Engineering and Applied mechanics.
