= Karyn Real =

American athlete (born 2001)

Personal information
- Born: October 7, 2001 (age 25)
- Home town: Diamond Bar, CA, USA
- Education: Massachusetts Institute of Technology
- Height: 5 ft 4 in (163 cm)
- Relative: Ryan Real (Brother)

Sport
- Country: USA
- Sport: Taekwondo
- Events: Recognized Poomsae, Freestyle Poomsae
- Club: Team Eagles Taekwondo
- Coached by: Jung Hwan Jin

Achievements and titles
- Highest world ranking: 2 (2022)
Medal record
Women's Taekwondo
Representing United States
World Championships
Bronze medal – third place	2018 Taipei	Recognized, F Junior
Pan American Games
Gold medal – first place	2019 Lima	Freestyle, Team
Bronze medal – third place	2019 Lima	Recognized, F Under 30
Pan American Championships
Bronze medal – third place	2014 Aguascalientes	Poomsae, F Cadet
Silver medal – second place	2015 Aguascalientes	Recognized, pair
Gold medal – first place	2017 San José	Recognized, Pair Junior
Bronze medal – third place	2017 San José	Recognized, F Junior
Gold medal – first place	2020 online	Recognized, F Under 30
Gold medal – first place	2022 online	Recognized, F Under 30
Gold medal – first place	2022 Punta Cana	Recognized, Pair Under 30
Silver medal – second place	2022 Punta Cana	Recognized, F Under 30
Gold medal – first place	2024 Rio de Janeiro	Recognized, Pair Under 30
Gold medal – first place	2026 Rio de Janeiro	Recognized, Pair Under 30
World Beach Championships
Gold medal – first place	2023 Chuncheon	Recognized, Pair Under 30
Bronze medal – third place	2023 Chuncheon	Recognized, F Under 30
World Taekwondo Poomsae Open Challenge
Gold medal – first place	2023 Muju	Recognized, F Under 30

Karyn Real (born October 7, 2001) is an American taekwondo athlete.

== Career ==
Karyn Real started practicing the Korean martial art of Taekwondo in 2007 under Grand Master Young In Cheon in Diamond Bar, California. She began competing in both the poomsae and sparring disciplines at the national level in 2010. Real won her first major international medal at the 2011 U.S. Open, finishing first in the 10-11 individual competition.

Until 2016, Real competed in several kyorugi competitions. She placed second in the cadets' 29 kg weight class at the 2012 US Open and third in the juniors' 42 kg weight class at the 2016 Canada Open.

Real earned numerous international accolades across the cadet, junior, and senior age categories. At the 2014 World Championships in Aguascalientes she finished fifth in the cadet individual competition. At the 2018 World Poomsae Championships in Taipei, she claimed a bronze medal in the Junior individual recognized poomsae competition.

To start her Senior career, at the 2019 Pan American Games held in Lima, Real competed with Team USA for the first Poomsae appearance at any Pan Am Games. Real won a bronze medal in the women's individual recognized competition and reached first place as part of the mixed team freestyle competition. She also competed at the 2022 World Championships in Goyang and reached fifth place in the Female Under 30 individual Recognized Poomsae competition, and also placed fifth in the Pair Under 30 competition alongside her brother Ryan Real.

At the 2023 World Beach Championships in Chuncheon, she and Ryan Real won the gold medal in the Pair Under 30 recognized poomsae competition. She also placed third in the Female Under 30 individual competition. Later that year, at the 2023 Muju World Taekwondo Poomsae Open Challenge, she won the gold medal in the Female Under 30 individual category, qualifying for a wild card to the 2024 World Poomsae Championships.

At the 2024 World Poomsae Championships in Hong Kong, she placed fifth again in the Female Under 30 individual recognized competition, and placed ninth in the Pair Under 30 competition with Ryan Real. The pair competed again at the 2026 World Poomsae Championships in Chuncheon, finishing ninth in the Pair Under 30 division.

== Personal life ==
Real attended Diamond Bar High School, where she graduated in 2019. She studied at Massachusetts Institute of Technology (MIT) in Cambridge, Massachusetts, receiving her undergraduate degree in 2023. She then continued her studies at MIT, receiving a Master of Engineering (MEng) in 2024.
