= Hans-Carsten Gauger =

German taekwondo athlete

Personal information
- Born: 23 March 1970 (age 56) Gießen, Germany

Sport
- Country: Germany
- Sport: Taekwondo
- Event: Traditional Poomsae
- Club: Taekwondo Verein Bergstraße Bensheim e.V.
- Coached by: Michael Brenner; Marcus Ketteniß

Achievements and titles
- Regional finals: 2nd place, silver medalist(s)
Medal record
Men's Taekwondo
Representing Germany
European Championships
Silver medal – second place	2023 Innsbruck	Poomsae, m<60
European Cup
Bronze medal – third place	2022 Stockholm	Poomsae, m<60

Hans-Carsten Gauger (born 23 March 1970) is a German taekwondo athlete and 2023 Vice European champion in traditional poomsae.

== Taekwondo career ==
Hans-Carsten Gauger began practising taekwondo at the age of 18 at the ‘International Sports School’ in Wiesbaden, training under Michael Brenner (*1950) for four years. He competed in his first tournaments at national level in 1989, but not with any notable success at the time. After a break, he resumed training at Heppenheim Gymnastics Club in 2002.

At the age of 45, Gauger returned to the competition scene and went on to achieve success at national and international level in the poomsae discipline. In 2015, he took part in the German Championships for the first time in Wiesbaden, where he won the bronze medal.

At the 2023 European Poomsae Championships in Innsbruck, Gauger won a silver medal in the individual competition for men up to the age of 60, making him Vice European Champion.

Gauger holds a "Trainer C" coaches licence. In 2013, he founded the ‘Taekwondo-Verein Bergstraße Bensheim e.V.’ together with six other founding members. In 2021, he took over the management of the office of the Hessian Taekwondo Union.

== Tournament record ==
Year	Event	Location	G-Rank	Discipline	Place
2023	European Championships	(Austria) Innsbruck	G-4	Poomsae Individual	2nd
2023	French Open	(France) Paris	G-1	Poomsae Individual	2nd
2023	Swedish Open	(Sweden) Stockholm	G-1	Poomsae Individual	3rd
2022	Danish Open	(Denmark) Skanderborg	-	Poomsae Individual	3rd
2022	European Cup	(Sweden) Stockholm	G-2	Poomsae Individual	3rd
2022	Swedish Open	(Sweden) Stockholm	G-2	Poomsae Individual	2nd
2019	Belgian Open	(Belgium) Hasselt	-	Poomsae Pair	3rd
