= 2023 European Poomsae Championships =

16th European Poomsae Taekwondo Championships
- Venue: Olympiaworld
- Location: (Austria) Innsbruck
- Dates: 24–26 November 2023
- Competitors: 463

Champion
- Spain

The 2023 European Poomsae Taekwondo Championships, the 16th edition of the European Poomsae Championships, was held in Innsbruck, Austria, at the Olympiaworld venue from 24 to 26 November 2023. Additionally, the 1st European Poomsae Para Taekwondo Championships were held alongside the Poomsae Championships, making both competitions a combined event.

The event was organized by the European Taekwondo Union and sanctioned by World Taekwondo.

== Medal table ==
* Host nation (Austria)

Rank	Nation	Gold	Silver	Bronze	Total
1	Spain	12	7	13	32
2	Germany	8	8	7	23
3	Turkey	5	5	2	12
4	Italy	5	3	6	14
5	Denmark	5	1	5	11
6	Great Britain	2	3	7	12
7	Portugal	1	0	1	2
8	France	0	4	6	10
9	Sweden	0	2	6	8
10	Finland	0	2	4	6
11	Austria*	0	1	1	2
12	Belgium	0	1	0	1
12	Czech Republic	0	1	0	1
14	Netherlands	0	0	8	8
15	Ukraine	0	0	6	6
16	Norway	0	0	1	1
16	Poland	0	0	1	1
16	Serbia	0	0	1	1
Totals (18 entries)		38	38	75	151

== Medal summary: Recognized Poomsae ==
=== Men ===
Event	Gold	Silver	Bronze
Individual Cadets	Matteo-Won Campana; Germany	Tim Voillard; France	Liam Sky Lumban; Norway
Individual Cadets	Matteo-Won Campana; Germany	Tim Voillard; France	Nicolas Achili; Italy
Individual Juniors	Zaw Torley; Great Britain	Marco Garcia Martinez; Spain	Mian Fromm; Germany
Individual Juniors	Zaw Torley; Great Britain	Marco Garcia Martinez; Spain	Marco Palma; Portugal
Individual under 30	Joël van der Weide; Netherlands	Pierre-Malo Tranchant; France	Carlos Rey Cuadrado; Spain
Individual under 30	Joël van der Weide; Netherlands	Pierre-Malo Tranchant; France	Muhammed Emir Yılmaz; Turkey
Individual under 40	Benjamin Harder; Denmark	Ali Kemal Ustabaş; Turkey	Hyeon Wook Kang; Italy
Individual under 40	Benjamin Harder; Denmark	Ali Kemal Ustabaş; Turkey	Murat Sarıkuş; Turkey
Individual under 50	Ramon Lopez Bailon; Spain	Ondrej Havlicek; Czech Republic	Eric Albasini; France
Individual under 50	Ramon Lopez Bailon; Spain	Ondrej Havlicek; Czech Republic	Christian Senft; Germany
Individual under 60	Anh-Tuan Do; Germany	Hans-Carsten Gauger; Germany	Hans Brian Aakmann Christensen; Denmark
Individual under 60	Anh-Tuan Do; Germany	Hans-Carsten Gauger; Germany	Ji-Pyo Lim; Sweden
Individual under 65	Jorn Andersen; Denmark	Josef Chiu; Sweden	Jose Manuel Marin Fernandez; Spain
Individual under 65	Jorn Andersen; Denmark	Josef Chiu; Sweden	Manfred Stadtmüller; Germany
Individual over 65	Jeong Cheol Kim Kim; Spain	Ali Pourtaheri; Great Britain	Guy Friess; France
Individual over 65	Jeong Cheol Kim Kim; Spain	Ali Pourtaheri; Great Britain	Leszek Wenecki; Poland

=== Women ===
Event	Gold	Silver	Bronze
Individual Cadets	Ksenia Alexandra Bongard; Germany	Emma Au-Nguyen; Denmark	Romane Soukhotine; France
Individual Cadets	Ksenia Alexandra Bongard; Germany	Emma Au-Nguyen; Denmark	Robin Leewis; Netherlands
Individual Juniors	Annebell Tamayo Wittendorf Ibsen; Denmark	Laura Alvarez Suarez; Spain	Pia Hoffmann; Germany
Individual Juniors	Annebell Tamayo Wittendorf Ibsen; Denmark	Laura Alvarez Suarez; Spain	Ellen Eckerstrom; Sweden
Individual under 30	Eva Sandersen; Denmark	Şeyda Nur Yavuz; Turkey	Alicia Brännback; Sweden
Individual under 30	Eva Sandersen; Denmark	Şeyda Nur Yavuz; Turkey	Anna Schneeberger; Austria
Individual under 40	Franziska Schneegans; Germany	Charlotte Pedersen; Denmark	Núria Serra Fernández; Spain
Individual under 40	Franziska Schneegans; Germany	Charlotte Pedersen; Denmark	Katia Parroche; Switzerland
Individual under 50	Vanesa Ortega Villodres; Spain	Wenqi Li; Great Britain	Johanna Nukari; Finland
Individual under 50	Vanesa Ortega Villodres; Spain	Wenqi Li; Great Britain	Nicole Nielsen; Denmark
Individual under 60	Heekyung Reimann; Germany	Soo mi Jo Lee; Spain	Niina Virtala; Finland
Individual under 60	Heekyung Reimann; Germany	Soo mi Jo Lee; Spain	Sybille Forca; France
Individual under 65	Marina Riquelme Ballester; Spain	Vera Moens; Belgium	Leni Niedermayr; Austria
Individual under 65	Marina Riquelme Ballester; Spain	Vera Moens; Belgium	Marina Malaffo; Great Britain
Individual over 65	Eduarda Ferraz; Portugal	Marie France David; France	Jenny Furness; Great Britain

=== Team competitions ===
Event	Gold	Silver	Bronze
Pair Cadet	Germany	France	Italy
Pair Cadet	Germany	France	Spain
Pair Juniors	Spain	Germany	Sweden
Pair Juniors	Spain	Germany	United Kingdom
Pair under 30	Spain	Turkey	Germany
Pair under 30	Spain	Turkey	Netherlands
Pair over 30	Turkey	Spain	France
Pair over 30	Turkey	Spain	Netherlands
Team Male Cadet	United Kingdom	Italy	Spain
Team Male Cadet	United Kingdom	Italy	Netherlands
Team Female Cadet	Spain	Finland	United Kingdom
Team Female Cadet	Spain	Finland	Sweden
Team Male Junior	Spain	Finland	Ukraine
Team Male Junior	Spain	Finland	Sweden
Team Female Junior	Germany	United Kingdom	Finland
Team Female Junior	Germany	United Kingdom	Spain
Team Male under 30	Spain	Austria	United Kingdom
Team Male under 30	Spain	Austria	Italy
Team Female under 30	Denmark	Spain	Netherlands
Team Female under 30	Denmark	Spain	Italy
Team Male over 30	Germany	Spain	Finland
Team Male over 30	Germany	Spain	Serbia
Team Female over 30	Denmark	Germany	Spain
Team Female over 30	Denmark	Germany	United Kingdom

== Medal summary: Freestyle Poomsae ==
=== Men ===
Event	Gold	Silver	Bronze
Individual Male under 17	Muhammed Çağrı Gülen; Turkey	Wyatt Sommerfeld; Germany	Roman Bilous; Ukraine
Individual Male under 17	Muhammed Çağrı Gülen; Turkey	Wyatt Sommerfeld; Germany	Anton Sabin Rendo; Spain
Individual Male over 17	Manuel Alejandro Paz Romer; Spain	Aykut Taşgın; Turkey	Jules Berger; Germany
Individual Male over 17	Manuel Alejandro Paz Romer; Spain	Aykut Taşgın; Turkey	Andreas Bregnballe Sörensen; Denmark

=== Women ===
Event	Gold	Silver	Bronze
Individual Female under 17	Beatrice Coradeschi; Italy	Isabelle Lammers; Sweden	Ecrin Yanıt; Turkey
Individual Female under 17	Beatrice Coradeschi; Italy	Isabelle Lammers; Sweden	Robin Leewis; Netherlands
Individual Female over 17	Eva Sandersen; Denmark	Leah Lawall; Germany	Gülsena Karakuyulu; Turkey
Individual Female over 17	Eva Sandersen; Denmark	Leah Lawall; Germany	Valentina Arlotti; Italy

=== Team competitions ===
Event	Gold	Silver	Bronze
Pair under 17	Turkey	Italy	Spain
Pair under 17	Turkey	Italy	Ukraine
Pair over 17	Italy	Turkey	Ukraine
Pair over 17	Italy	Turkey	Spain
Mixed Team over 12	Italy; Valentina Arlotti; Alessia Bertagnin; Luca Ferella; Luca Matellini; Andrea Norbiato	Germany; Jules Berger; Pia Hoffmann; Leah Lawall; Julius Müller; Ana Catalina Pohl	Denmark; Johan Hogrefe Fredmar; Johan Diget Hollederer; Silje Anne Liborius Jensen; Silja damm Kjolbo; Andreas Bregnballe Sorensen
Mixed Team over 12	Italy; Valentina Arlotti; Alessia Bertagnin; Luca Ferella; Luca Matellini; Andrea Norbiato	Germany; Jules Berger; Pia Hoffmann; Leah Lawall; Julius Müller; Ana Catalina Pohl	Spain; Yaiza Velo Diaz; Rubén Galdo Maira; Ines Abuin Sanchez; Irea Abuin Sanchez; Pepe Soto Veira

== Medal summary: Para Poomsae ==
=== Men ===
Event	Gold	Silver	Bronze
Senior I (A-class) P21	Bradley Brockies; Great Britain	Ben Savage; Great Britain	Viktor Frane Gliglo; Croatia
Senior I (A-class) P22	Stefano Guglielmi; Italy	Federico Fricano; Italy	
Senior I (A-class) P23	Renzo Caraccia; Italy	Matteo Tosoni; Italy	Bruno Zivkovic; Croatia
Senior I (A-class) P23	Renzo Caraccia; Italy	Matteo Tosoni; Italy	Dusan Marisavljevic; Serbia
Senior I (A-class) P32	Giovanni Sunseri; Italy		
Senior I (A-class) P33	Leon Bozo Skravan; Croatia	Filip Cimas; Croatia	
Senior I (A-class) P34	Riccardo Zimmerman; Italy		
Senior I (B-class) P21	Mateo Skara; Croatia	Thomas Mravec; Slovakia	
Senior I (B-class) P22	Roko Boduljak; Croatia		
Senior I (B-class) P31	Domagoj Vujcic; Croatia		
Senior I (B-class) P33	Peter Sopuch; Hungary		
Senior II (A-class) P34	Arndt Mallepree; Germany	Cristiano Sgarella; Italy	Luigi Carlino; Italy
Senior II (A-class) P21	Cianciotto Michele; Italy	Mario Komorclec; Croatia	Kelvin Lowe; Great Britain
Senior II (A-class) P51	Giuseppe Corasaniti; Italy		

=== Women ===
Event	Gold	Silver	Bronze
Senior I (A-class) P21	Summer Waheed; Great Britain	Teodora Jovic; Serbia	Melissa Engels; Belgium
Senior I (A-class) P22	Daniela Topic; Croatia	Gabrielle Toas; Great Britain	
Senior I (B-class) P21	Karla Lukac; Croatia		
Senior I (B-class) P31	Ivona Budiscak; Croatia		
Senior II (A-class) P23	Stefania Monaco; Italy		
Senior II (A-class) P21	Biserka Sambol; Croatia		
Senior II (A-class) P22	Tihana Preksavec; Croatia		
Senior II (A-class) P31	Senada Halilcevic; Croatia		
Senior II (A-class) P34	Lenka Simeckova; Czech Republic		
Senior II (B-class) P34	Jane Bedford; Great Britain		

== Participating nations ==
463 athletes from 28 countries:

1. Austria (14) (Host)
2. Belgium (6)
3. Croatia (12)
4. Czech Republic (7)
5. Denmark (20)
6. Spain (42)
7. Finland (14)
8. France (24)
9. Germany (35)
10. United Kingdom (28)
11. Greece (3)
12. Hungary (2)
13. Ireland (2)
14. Italy (31)
15. Netherlands (15)
16. Norway (8)
17. Poland (4)
18. Portugal (5)
19. Serbia (6)
20. Slovakia (3)
21. Sweden (11)
22. Switzerland (4)
23. Turkey (26)
24. Ukraine (9)
25. Iceland (2)
26. Romania (3)
27. Bulgaria (2)
28. Luxembourg (2)

== See also ==
- 2022 World Poomsae Championships
- 2023 World Taekwondo Championships
- 2024 European Taekwondo Championships
- 2024 World Poomsae Championships
- 2025 European Poomsae Championships
- 2024 World Para Poomsae Championships
