= German Taekwondo Union =

Taekwondo union

- Sport: Taekwondo
- Jurisdiction: Germany
- Founded: 1981
- Affiliation: World Taekwondo

Official website
- www.dtu.de
- (Germany)

The German Taekwondo Union (German: Deutsche Taekwondo Union or DTU) is the largest taekwondo association in Germany. It is a member of the German Olympic Sports Confederation (Deutscher Olympischer Sportbund or DOSB).

== International competition ==
DTU is a member of the European umbrella organization European Taekwondo Union (ETU) as well as the World Association for World Taekwondo (WT).

On the part of the German Olympic Committee, the German Taekwondo Union is the only taekwondo association authorized to send athletes to the Olympic Games.
