= 2025 European Poomsae Championships =

17th European Poomsae Taekwondo Championships
- Venue: UNIBET ARENA
- Location: (Estonia) Tallinn
- Dates: 16–17 April 2025
- Competitors: 497 from 29 nations

Champion
- Spain

The 2025 European Poomsae Taekwondo Championships, the 17th edition of the European Poomsae Championships, were held in Tallinn, Estonia, from 16 to 17 April 2025.

The event featured competitions in traditional poomsae as well as freestyle poomsae. It is classified as a G4 event and was organized by the European Taekwondo Union and sanctioned by World Taekwondo.

== Medal table ==
* Host nation (Estonia)

Rank	Nation	Gold	Silver	Bronze	Total
1	Spain	9	10	6	25
2	Turkey	8	6	8	22
3	France	4	4	3	11
4	Great Britain	4	3	5	12
5	Denmark	4	1	4	9
6	Germany	2	3	14	19
7	Ukraine	2	1	4	7
8	Italy	1	5	2	8
9	Netherlands	1	2	2	5
10	Finland	1	1	10	12
11	Norway	1	1	2	4
12	Greece	1	0	1	2
12	Portugal	1	0	1	2
14	Austria	0	2	5	7
15	Belgium	0	0	2	2
15	Sweden	0	0	2	2
17	Croatia	0	0	1	1
17	Czech Republic	0	0	1	1
17	Poland	0	0	1	1
Totals (19 entries)		39	39	74	152

== Medal summary: Recognized Poomsae ==
=== Men ===
Event	Gold	Silver	Bronze
Individual Cadets	Nikolaos Karakatsanis; Greece	Edward Sobiecki; Great Britain	Topias Elonen; Finland
Individual Cadets	Nikolaos Karakatsanis; Greece	Edward Sobiecki; Great Britain	Utku Efe; Turkey
Individual Juniors	Tim Voillard; France	Gino van Leeuwen; Netherlands	Nicolas Achilli; Italy
Individual Juniors	Tim Voillard; France	Gino van Leeuwen; Netherlands	Liam Sky Lumban; Norway
Individual under 30	Pierre-Malo Tranchant; France	Joël van der Weide; Netherlands	Marco Palma; Portugal
Individual under 30	Pierre-Malo Tranchant; France	Joël van der Weide; Netherlands	Tomas Fernandez; Spain
Individual under 40	Selgi Leblanc; France	Ali Kemal Ustabaş; Turkey	Alejandro Marin Borras; Spain
Individual under 40	Selgi Leblanc; France	Ali Kemal Ustabaş; Turkey	Benjamin Harder; Denmark
Individual under 50	Mevlüt Pekcan; Turkey	Sampsa Aukio; Finland	Eric Albasini; France
Individual under 50	Mevlüt Pekcan; Turkey	Sampsa Aukio; Finland	Jae-Hyong Kim; Austria
Individual under 60	Namık Konanç; Turkey	Antonio Moreno; Spain	Michael Bussmann; Germany
Individual under 60	Namık Konanç; Turkey	Antonio Moreno; Spain	Farid Begag; France
Individual under 65	Ata Alavi; Netherlands	Jon Andersen; Denmark	Teyfik Çelik; Turkey
Individual under 65	Ata Alavi; Netherlands	Jon Andersen; Denmark	Werner Unland; Germany
Individual over 65	Ali Pourtaheri; Great Britain	Michel Carron; France	Manfred Stadtmüller; Germany
Individual over 65	Ali Pourtaheri; Great Britain	Michel Carron; France	Leszek Wenecki; Poland

=== Women ===
Event	Gold	Silver	Bronze
Individual Cadets	Mei Ling Duque Mendoza; Spain	Tia Rehana Nazir; Germany	Ceren Behiye Okur; Turkey
Individual Cadets	Mei Ling Duque Mendoza; Spain	Tia Rehana Nazir; Germany	Amina Halhul; Finland
Individual Juniors	Adrianna Beard; Great Britain	Romane Soukhotine; France	Tuong-Vi Hannah Do; Germany
Individual Juniors	Adrianna Beard; Great Britain	Romane Soukhotine; France	Robin Leewis; Netherlands
Individual under 30	Eva Sandersen; Denmark	Pia Hoffmann; Germany	Axelle Bonnez; Belgium
Individual under 30	Eva Sandersen; Denmark	Pia Hoffmann; Germany	Alicia Brännback; Sweden
Individual under 40	Anna Kim; Norway	Laura Alvarez Suarez; Spain	Charlotte Pedersen; Denmark
Individual under 40	Anna Kim; Norway	Laura Alvarez Suarez; Spain	Joelle Tze-Hsin Tieterickx; Belgium
Individual under 50	Safiye Yalçın Türk; Turkey	Vanesa Ortega; Spain	Johanna Nukari; Finland
Individual under 50	Safiye Yalçın Türk; Turkey	Vanesa Ortega; Spain	Tina Herrmann; Germany
Individual under 60	Soo Mi Jo Lee; Spain	Celine Hery; France	Heekyung Reimann; Germany
Individual under 60	Soo Mi Jo Lee; Spain	Celine Hery; France	Karin Traxler; Austria
Individual under 65	Beatriz Queiro Campos; Spain	Sylvia Gringer; Austria	Sylvia Hohfeld; Germany
Individual under 65	Beatriz Queiro Campos; Spain	Sylvia Gringer; Austria	Sirpa Huuskonen; Finland
Individual over 65	Eduarda Ferraz; Portugal	Mireille Aunac; France	Tomasi Urizar; Spain
Individual over 65	Eduarda Ferraz; Portugal	Mireille Aunac; France	Leni Niedermayr; Austria

=== Team competitions ===
Event	Gold	Silver	Bronze
Pair Cadet	Finland; Amina Halhul; Leevi Heiskanen	Spain; Julia Cepeda Torres; Jaime Cerisola Tapia	United Kingdom; Naomi Lam; Edward Sobiecki
Pair Cadet	Finland; Amina Halhul; Leevi Heiskanen	Spain; Julia Cepeda Torres; Jaime Cerisola Tapia	Turkey; Reyyan Sonmez; Utku Efe
Pair Juniors	United Kingdom; Adrianna Beard; Louis Exton	Italy; Greta Mascherino; Nicolas Achilli	Austria; Stella Wasinger; Xavier Goss
Pair Juniors	United Kingdom; Adrianna Beard; Louis Exton	Italy; Greta Mascherino; Nicolas Achilli	Germany; Tuong-Vi Do; Wyatt Sommerfeld
Pair under 30	Spain; Laura Alvarez Suarez; Daniel Arean Grejs	Norway; Tuva Hatlen Kjodnes; Sune Ostli	Italy; Claudia Cianci; Michelangelo Sampognaro
Pair under 30	Spain; Laura Alvarez Suarez; Daniel Arean Grejs	Norway; Tuva Hatlen Kjodnes; Sune Ostli	Sweden; Alicia Brännback; Mans Dahlgren
Pair under 50	Denmark; Benjamin Harder; Charlotte Pedersen	Spain; Vanesa Ortega; Ramon Lopez Bailon	Finland; Olli Siltanen; Johanna Nukari
Pair under 50	Denmark; Benjamin Harder; Charlotte Pedersen	Spain; Vanesa Ortega; Ramon Lopez Bailon	Czech Republic; Hana Vu; Anh Viet Vu
Pair under 60	Germany; Heekyung Reimann; Michael Bussmann	Spain; Isabel Gomez Mendez; Bernardo Hernando Lucas	Austria; Karin Traxler; Martin Seelos
Pair under 60	Germany; Heekyung Reimann; Michael Bussmann	Spain; Isabel Gomez Mendez; Bernardo Hernando Lucas	France; Celine Hery; Farid Begag
Pair over 60	Germany; Sylvia Hohfeld; Manfred Stadtmuller	Austria; Leni Niedermayr; Gerhard Reinsperger	Turkey; Sevgican Yalcin; Serif Kandirmis
Pair over 60	Germany; Sylvia Hohfeld; Manfred Stadtmuller	Austria; Leni Niedermayr; Gerhard Reinsperger	Spain; Beatriz Queiro Campos; Manuel Sanmartin
Team Male Cadet	Turkey; Salih Aymaz, Ali Kaan Mese, Mehmet Tural	United Kingdom; Jinmi Akinrele, James Sau, Ethan Wan	Finland; Topias Elonen, Viljami Elonen, Emil Karma
Team Male Cadet	Turkey; Salih Aymaz, Ali Kaan Mese, Mehmet Tural	United Kingdom; Jinmi Akinrele, James Sau, Ethan Wan	Greece; Efstratios Eleftheriadis, Lazaros Eleftheriadis, Christos Poulos
Team Female Cadet	Turkey; Melek Ahu Celik, Ceren Behiye Okur, Reyyan Sonmez	Spain; Marina Garcias, Caterina Lladonet, Lina Roman	Finland; Elsa Alavillamo, Emilia Kivikangas, Alexina Leino
Team Female Cadet	Turkey; Melek Ahu Celik, Ceren Behiye Okur, Reyyan Sonmez	Spain; Marina Garcias, Caterina Lladonet, Lina Roman	United Kingdom; Fearne Corkish, Vi Ho, Bethany Smith
Team Male Junior	Spain; Hugo Arnoso Naveiras; Aitor Teijeiro Eladio; Mateo Fernandez	Turkey; Emre Devrengec; Bahadir Turken; Ali Bugra Yilmaz	Ukraine; Yevhen Lantukh; Mykyta Neviedomykh; Tymofii Vypasnyak
Team Male Junior	Spain; Hugo Arnoso Naveiras; Aitor Teijeiro Eladio; Mateo Fernandez	Turkey; Emre Devrengec; Bahadir Turken; Ali Bugra Yilmaz	United Kingdom; Kieran Owen; Peter Sellwood; Jia Hao Yu
Team Female Junior	Turkey; Nilda Aytekin; Ruya Gokce; Nursena Gultekin	Spain; Noa Campillo Andres; Jessy Sun Shin Veiga; Noa Zarate Gracia	Norway; Maya Gasperini Kjeldsen; Jenny Shin Nakstad; Annie Wicklund
Team Female Junior	Turkey; Nilda Aytekin; Ruya Gokce; Nursena Gultekin	Spain; Noa Campillo Andres; Jessy Sun Shin Veiga; Noa Zarate Gracia	United Kingdom; Evie Co; Kaitlin Hoang; Cuba Wilson
Team Male under 30	Spain; Marco Garcia Martinez; Alejandro Losada; Carlos Rey Cuadrado	Germany; Emir Can Erdemir; Mian Fromm; Patrick Kuzenko	France; Tristan Hery; Mathys Thiramany; Pierre-Malo Tranchant
Team Male under 30	Spain; Marco Garcia Martinez; Alejandro Losada; Carlos Rey Cuadrado	Germany; Emir Can Erdemir; Mian Fromm; Patrick Kuzenko	Turkey; Yusuf Emre Akbiyik; Furkan Bayrak; Yigit Kemal Yilmaz
Team Female under 30	Spain; Carolina Escolar Parra; Alicia Yin Lopez Mendez; Carla Galiano Jimenez	Turkey; Dilan Yaprak Alan; Seyda Nur Yavuz; Busra Deniz Yilmaz	Germany; Anna Monika Siepmann; Helena Silberhorn; Thi Nam Phuong Vuong
Team Female under 30	Spain; Carolina Escolar Parra; Alicia Yin Lopez Mendez; Carla Galiano Jimenez	Turkey; Dilan Yaprak Alan; Seyda Nur Yavuz; Busra Deniz Yilmaz	Finland; Aino Kortelainen; Linda Rakkolainen; Sofia Sarala
Team Male under 50	France; Fabien Babault; Selgi Leblanc; Alexis Mehrmann	Turkey; Fazli Karisik; Murat Sarikus; Adil Tekin	Germany; Fabian Frank; Hilko Paschke; Christian Senft
Team Male under 50	France; Fabien Babault; Selgi Leblanc; Alexis Mehrmann	Turkey; Fazli Karisik; Murat Sarikus; Adil Tekin	Finland; Sampsa Aukio; Tatu Iivanainen; Ville Lethinen
Team Female under 50	Turkey; Rabia Kim Karisik; Fatma Torehan; Safiye Yalcin Turk	United Kingdom; Sheena Au-Yeung; Georgina Ingram; Ling Tze Tan	Germany; Baerbel Baeuerle; Angelika Bussmann; Bianca Schoenemeier
Team Female under 50	Turkey; Rabia Kim Karisik; Fatma Torehan; Safiye Yalcin Turk	United Kingdom; Sheena Au-Yeung; Georgina Ingram; Ling Tze Tan	Finland; Miia Astala; Laura Kinnunen; Laura Wild
Team Male under 60	Spain; Bernardo Hernando Lucas; Antonio Moreno; Seung Han Shin Jang	Turkey; Omer Budancamanak; Zeynel Celik; Ismail Kokcu	Denmark; Anders Prahl Bennedsen; Hans Brian Aakmann Christensen; Preben Ernst
Team Male under 60	Spain; Bernardo Hernando Lucas; Antonio Moreno; Seung Han Shin Jang	Turkey; Omer Budancamanak; Zeynel Celik; Ismail Kokcu	United Kingdom; Simon Negus; Wayne Nicklin; Mark Pawlett
Team Female under 60	Spain; Beatriz Castellanos; Esperanza Fernande; Isabel Gomez Mendez	United Kingdom; Maria Pier; Gilliam Raylor-Fitzpatrick; Juliet Williams	/
Team Female under 60	Spain; Beatriz Castellanos; Esperanza Fernande; Isabel Gomez Mendez	United Kingdom; Maria Pier; Gilliam Raylor-Fitzpatrick; Juliet Williams	/
Team Male over 60	Turkey; Teyfik Celik; Mehmet Orkan; Mustafa Kemal Yildiran	United Kingdom; Michael Pejic; Ali Pourtaheri; Gerry Reilly	Spain; Fernando Manuel Jose Bendala Alvarez; Alberto Calvo Guisado; Jose Manuel Marin Fernandez
Team Male over 60	Turkey; Teyfik Celik; Mehmet Orkan; Mustafa Kemal Yildiran	United Kingdom; Michael Pejic; Ali Pourtaheri; Gerry Reilly	/

== Medal summary: Freestyle Poomsae ==
=== Men ===
Event	Gold	Silver	Bronze
Individual Male under 17	Alvaro Ballesteros Diaz; Spain	Davyd Gavrylov; Ukraine	Filippo Di Vincenzo; Italy
Individual Male under 17	Alvaro Ballesteros Diaz; Spain	Davyd Gavrylov; Ukraine	Wyat Sommerfeld; Germany
Individual Male over 17	Aykut Taşgın; Turkey	Ruben Galdo Maira; Spain	Roman Biolus; Ukraine
Individual Male over 17	Aykut Taşgın; Turkey	Ruben Galdo Maira; Spain	Borna Pecko; Croatia

=== Women ===
Event	Gold	Silver	Bronze
Individual Female under 17	Yeva Gavrylova; Ukraine	Sofia Bechini; Italy	Ecrin Yanıt; Turkey
Individual Female under 17	Yeva Gavrylova; Ukraine	Sofia Bechini; Italy	Robin Leewis; Netherlands
Individual Female over 17	Eva Sandersen; Denmark	Valentina Arlotti; Italy	Judith Fernandez Albarca; Spain
Individual Female over 17	Eva Sandersen; Denmark	Valentina Arlotti; Italy	Leah Lawall; Germany

=== Team competitions ===
Event	Gold	Silver	Bronze
Pair under 17	Ukraine; Davyd Gavrylo; Yeva Gavrylova	Italy; Thomas Campana; Gaia Molari	Spain; Nadia Blanco Babio; Pepe Soto Veira
Pair under 17	Ukraine; Davyd Gavrylo; Yeva Gavrylova	Italy; Thomas Campana; Gaia Molari	Turkey; Enes Akar; Ecrin Yanit
Pair over 17	Denmark; Johan Hogrefe Fredmar; Silje Anne Liborius Jensen	Italy; Valentina Arlotti; Luca Matellini	Turkey; Kubra Dagli; Emirhan Muran
Pair over 17	Denmark; Johan Hogrefe Fredmar; Silje Anne Liborius Jensen	Italy; Valentina Arlotti; Luca Matellini	Ukraine; Mykhailo Kniazhev; Myroslava Koval
Mixed Team under 17	Italy; Sofia Bechini; Thomas Campana; Filippo Di Vincenzo; Emanuele Fugazza; Federica Leone	Spain; Hugo Arnoso Naveiras; Nadia Blanco Babio; Ivan Pena Perez; Nuria Rodriguez; Ana Llin Shin Veiga; Lucas Yelo Palomera	Ukraine; Oleksandr Fylonenko; Polina Ivanova; Yevhenii Kapustynskyi; Daria Klochko; Yurii Kovalenko
Mixed Team under 17	Italy; Sofia Bechini; Thomas Campana; Filippo Di Vincenzo; Emanuele Fugazza; Federica Leone	Spain; Hugo Arnoso Naveiras; Nadia Blanco Babio; Ivan Pena Perez; Nuria Rodriguez; Ana Llin Shin Veiga; Lucas Yelo Palomera	/
Mixed Team over 17	Italy; Christian Borrello; Giada Bronzetti; Beatrice Coradeschi; Luca Ferella; Andrea Norbiato; Federico Serain	Spain; Ines Abuin Sanchez; Irea Abuin Sanchez; Miguel Barreiro; Ruben Galdo Maira; Pepe Soto Veira; Yaiza Velo Diaz	Turkey; Pelin Duzen; Muhammed Cagri Gulen; Gulsena Karakuyulu; Omer Dogukan Ozturk; Emre Senturk; Aykut Tasgin
Mixed Team over 17	Italy; Christian Borrello; Giada Bronzetti; Beatrice Coradeschi; Luca Ferella; Andrea Norbiato; Federico Serain	Spain; Ines Abuin Sanchez; Irea Abuin Sanchez; Miguel Barreiro; Ruben Galdo Maira; Pepe Soto Veira; Yaiza Velo Diaz	Germany; Pia Hoffmann; Steven Behn; Leah Lawall; Julius Müller; Ana Catalina Pohl

== Related ==
Additionally to the 2025 European Poomsae Championships, the 2025 European Para Poomsae Championships were too held in Tallinn.

In the same year, the European ITF Taekwondo Championships were also held in Tallinn from April 28 to May 4.

== Participating nations ==
497 athletes from 29 countries:

1. Austria (10)
2. Belgium (5)
3. Croatia (9)
4. Czech Republic (4)
5. Denmark (19)
6. Spain (48)
7. Finland (18)
8. France (17)
9. Germany (36)
10. United Kingdom (26)
11. Greece (6)
12. Hungary (2)
13. Ireland (2)
14. Israel (1)
15. Italy (33)
16. Moldova (1)
17. Netherlands (14)
18. Norway (7)
19. Poland (5)
20. Portugal (4)
21. Serbia (4)
22. Slovakia (2)
23. Sweden (9)
24. Switzerland (3)
25. Turkey (29)
26. Ukraine (11)
27. Iceland (1)
28. Romania (2)
29. Luxembourg (1)

== See also ==
- 2023 European Poomsae Championships
- 2024 World Poomsae Championships
- 2024 European Taekwondo Championships
