= 2022 World Poomsae Championships =

Goyang 2022 World Taekwondo Poomsae Championships
- Venue: KINTEX
- Location: (South Korea) Goyang
- Dates: 21 April - 24 April 2022
- Competitors: 760 from 63 nations

The 2022 World Taekwondo Poomsae Championships, the 13th edition of the World Taekwondo Poomsae Championships, were held in Goyang, South Korea, at the Korea International Exhibition Center (KINTEX) from April 21 to April 24, 2022.

The event was organized by World Taekwondo and the Korea Taekwondo Association (KTA). The World Poomsae Championships were hosted by South Korea for the third time.

== Medal summary: Recognized Poomsae ==
=== Men ===
Event	Gold	Silver	Bronze
Individual Cadets	Seung Ju Lee; South Korea	Kuan-fu Liu; Chinese Taipei	Thai Ha Anh Nguyen; Vietnam
Individual Cadets	Seung Ju Lee; South Korea	Kuan-fu Liu; Chinese Taipei	Kobe Lok Yin Fung; United States
Individual Juniors	Lee Junhee; South Korea	Sung Hyun Eric Gun; United States	Ho-hsuan Tsai; Chinese Taipei
Individual Juniors	Lee Junhee; South Korea	Sung Hyun Eric Gun; United States	Amirali Alizadeh; Iran
Individual under 30	Wan-jin Kang; South Korea	Jun-ho Kim; South Korea	Rodolfo Reyes Jr. Philippines
Individual under 30	Wan-jin Kang; South Korea	Jun-ho Kim; South Korea	Ryan Real; United States
Individual under 40	Jae Uk Jang; South Korea	Alejandro Marin Borras; Spain	Raffique Hashimi Hashim; Malaysia
Individual under 40	Jae Uk Jang; South Korea	Alejandro Marin Borras; Spain	Minki Seong; United States
Individual under 50	Ernesto Guzman; Philippines	Hak Dong Kim; South Korea	Patricio Martinez Cano; Spain
Individual under 50	Ernesto Guzman; Philippines	Hak Dong Kim; South Korea	Pok Sun Yang; United States
Individual under 60	Cheol-hee Lee; South Korea	Ky-tu Dang; Denmark	Juan Enrique Luna; Mexico
Individual under 60	Cheol-hee Lee; South Korea	Ky-tu Dang; Denmark	Taewon Jung; United States
Individual under 65	Nader Khodamoradi; Iran	Dong Kyun Seo; South Korea	Jørn Christian Andersen; Denmark
Individual under 65	Nader Khodamoradi; Iran	Dong Kyun Seo; South Korea	Manfred Stadtmüller; Germany
Individual over 65	Jeong Cheol Kim Kim; Spain	Jae-jin Kang; South Korea	Hadi Torkashvand; Iran
Individual over 65	Jeong Cheol Kim Kim; Spain	Jae-jin Kang; South Korea	Chi Duong; United States

=== Women ===
Event	Gold	Silver	Bronze
Individual Cadets	Song yeon Han; South Korea	Yi-hsuan Chang; Chinese Taipei	Mikayla Xiong; United States
Individual Cadets	Song yeon Han; South Korea	Yi-hsuan Chang; Chinese Taipei	Brisa Alexandra Alekc Hernandez; Mexico
Individual Juniors	Jooyeong Lee; South Korea	Chang-ying Yang; Chinese Taipei	Fatemeh Salmanizadeh Najafabadi; Iran
Individual Juniors	Jooyeong Lee; South Korea	Chang-ying Yang; Chinese Taipei	Thuy Nhi Bui; Vietnam
Individual under 30	Eva Sandersen; Denmark	Marjan Salahshouri; Iran	Pin-chieh Huang; Chinese Taipei
Individual under 30	Eva Sandersen; Denmark	Marjan Salahshouri; Iran	Kaitlyn Reclusado; United States
Individual under 40	Yu-jin Kang; South Korea	Katia Parroche; Switzerland	Carissa Fu; United States
Individual under 40	Yu-jin Kang; South Korea	Katia Parroche; Switzerland	Wen li-ting Kao; Chinese Taipei
Individual under 50	Vanesa Ortega Villodres; Spain	Kathy Do; United States	Yeon-bu Kim; South Korea
Individual under 50	Vanesa Ortega Villodres; Spain	Kathy Do; United States	Johanna Nukari; Finland
Individual under 60	Rommy Hubner Thorne; Peru	Cindy Sin Sook Um; United States	Soo Mi Jo Lee; Spain
Individual under 60	Rommy Hubner Thorne; Peru	Cindy Sin Sook Um; United States	Niina Virtala; Finland
Individual under 65	Barbara Brand; United States	Vera Moens; Belgium	Shelley Vettese-Baert; Canada
Individual under 65	Barbara Brand; United States	Vera Moens; Belgium	Leni Niedermayr; Austria
Individual over 65	Linda Sim; Singapore	Bronwyn Butterworth; United States	Marie-France David; France
Individual over 65	Linda Sim; Singapore	Bronwyn Butterworth; United States	Luiza Yabiku; Brazil

=== Team competitions ===
Event	Gold	Silver	Bronze
Pair Cadet	Chinese Taipei	United States	Mexico
Pair Cadet	Chinese Taipei	United States	Vietnam
Pair Juniors	Chinese Taipei	Philippines	Spain
Pair Juniors	Chinese Taipei	Philippines	Iran
Pair under 30	Chinese Taipei	Malaysia	Vietnam
Pair under 30	Chinese Taipei	Malaysia	Thailand
Pair over 30	Spain	Iran	France
Pair over 30	Spain	Iran	United States
Team Male Cadet	South Korea	Chinese Taipei	Egypt
Team Male Cadet	South Korea	Chinese Taipei	United States; Kobe Lok Yin Fung; Whye Jing Ong; Kalyx Calimlim
Team Female Cadet	United States	Chinese Taipei	South Korea
Team Female Cadet	United States	Chinese Taipei	Vietnam
Team Male Junior	United States	South Korea	Vietnam
Team Male Junior	United States	South Korea	Chinese Taipei
Team Female Junior	South Korea	Iran	Chinese Taipei
Team Female Junior	South Korea	Iran	United States
Team Male under 30	Chinese Taipei	South Korea	Vietnam
Team Male under 30	Chinese Taipei	South Korea	Indonesia
Team Female under 30	South Korea	Chinese Taipei	Thailand
Team Female under 30	South Korea	Chinese Taipei	Malaysia
Team Male over 30	South Korea	Iran	United States
Team Male over 30	South Korea	Iran	Spain
Team Female over 30	South Korea	United States	Brazil
Team Female over 30	South Korea	United States	Mexico

== Medal summary: Freestyle Poomsae ==
=== Men ===
Event	Gold	Silver	Bronze
Individual Male under 17	Jin-ho Lee; South Korea	Anthony Do; United States	Thanh an Ho; Vietnam
Individual Male under 17	Jin-ho Lee; South Korea	Anthony Do; United States	Andi Sultan; Indonesia
Individual Male over 17	Namhoon Lee; South Korea	William Arroyo; Mexico	Jinsu Ha; Canada
Individual Male over 17	Namhoon Lee; South Korea	William Arroyo; Mexico	Darius Venerable; Philippines

=== Women ===
Event	Gold	Silver	Bronze
Individual Female under 17	Han-sol Jang; South Korea	Yu-jan Hsu; Chinese Taipei	Adina Machwirth; Germany
Individual Female under 17	Han-sol Jang; South Korea	Yu-jan Hsu; Chinese Taipei	Gian Legaspi; United States
Individual Female over 17	Ye Eun Cha; South Korea	Adalis Munoz; United States	Phan khanh han Nguyen; Vietnam
Individual Female over 17	Ye Eun Cha; South Korea	Adalis Munoz; United States	Eva Sandersen; Denmark

=== Pairs ===
Event	Gold	Silver	Bronze
Pair under 17	South Korea	United States	Mexico
Pair under 17	South Korea	United States	Canada
Pair over 17	Mexico	Philippines	Chinese Taipei
Pair over 17	Mexico	Philippines	Canada

=== Mixed Teams ===
Event	Gold	Silver	Bronze
Mixed Team under 17	South Korea	Vietnam	Chinese Taipei
Mixed Team under 17	South Korea	Vietnam	United States
Mixed Team over 17	South Korea	Chinese Taipei	Mexico
Mixed Team over 17	South Korea	Chinese Taipei	United States

== Medal table ==
* Host nation (South Korea)

Rank	Nation	Gold	Silver	Bronze	Total
1	South Korea*	20	6	2	28
2	Chinese Taipei	4	8	7	19
3	United States	3	9	16	28
4	Spain	3	1	4	8
5	Iran	1	4	4	9
6	Philippines	1	2	2	5
7	Mexico	1	1	6	8
8	Denmark	1	1	2	4
9	Peru	1	0	0	1
9	Singapore	1	0	0	1
11	Vietnam	0	1	9	10
12	Malaysia	0	1	2	3
13	Belgium	0	1	0	1
13	Switzerland	0	1	0	1
15	Canada	0	0	4	4
16	Brazil	0	0	2	2
16	Finland	0	0	2	2
16	France	0	0	2	2
16	Germany	0	0	2	2
16	Indonesia	0	0	2	2
16	Thailand	0	0	2	2
22	Austria	0	0	1	1
22	Egypt	0	0	1	1
Totals (23 entries)		36	36	72	144

== See also ==
- 2024 World Poomsae Championships
- 2023 European Poomsae Championships
- 2025 European Poomsae Championships
