= 2024 World Poomsae Championships =

Hong Kong 2024 World Taekwondo Poomsae Championships
- Venue: Hong Kong Coliseum
- Location: Hong Kong
- Dates: 30 November - 4 December 2024
- Competitors: 1727 from 79 nations

The 2024 World Taekwondo Poomsae Championships, the 14th edition of the World Taekwondo Poomsae Championships, were held in Hong Kong at the Hong Kong Coliseum from November 30 to December 4, 2024. The tournament is classified as a G-8 event.

The event was organized by World Taekwondo and the "Hong Kong, China Taekwondo Association“. The World Championships were hosted in Hong Kong for the first time.

== History ==
1. 2006 Seoul, South Korea
2. 2007 Incheon, South Korea
3. 2008 Ankara, Turkey
4. 2009 Cairo, Egypt
5. 2010 Tashkent, Uzbekistan
6. 2011 Vladivostok, Russia
7. 2012 Tunja, Colombia
8. 2013 Bali, Indonesia
9. 2014 Aguascalientes, Mexico
10. 2016 Lima, Peru
11. 2018 Taipei, Taiwan
12. 2020 South Korea Online
13. 2022 Goyang, South Korea
14. 2024 Hong Kong, China
15. 2026 Chuncheon, South Korea

== Medal table ==
* Host nation (Hong Kong)

Rank	Nation	Gold	Silver	Bronze	Total
1	South Korea	17	6	2	25
2	United States	9	4	4	17
3	Chinese Taipei	4	5	6	15
4	Iran	3	2	4	9
4	Vietnam	3	2	4	9
6	China	2	1	3	6
7	Germany	1	2	2	5
8	Spain	1	1	3	5
9	Austria	1	0	2	3
10	Portugal	1	0	0	1
11	Australia	0	3	4	7
11	Thailand	0	3	4	7
13	Denmark	0	3	1	4
14	Philippines	0	2	8	10
15	Mexico	0	2	7	9
16	Great Britain	0	2	3	5
17	Hong Kong*	0	1	4	5
18	Canada	0	1	3	4
19	Argentina	0	1	2	3
20	Malaysia	0	1	1	2
21	Japan	0	0	3	3
22	Brazil	0	0	2	2
22	Italy	0	0	2	2
22	Norway	0	0	2	2
25	Egypt	0	0	1	1
25	Finland	0	0	1	1
25	France	0	0	1	1
25	Macau	0	0	1	1
25	Myanmar	0	0	1	1
25	Peru	0	0	1	1
Totals (30 entries)		42	42	82	166

== Medal summary: Recognized Poomsae ==
=== Men ===
Event	Gold	Silver	Bronze
Individual Cadets	Kim Jeong-jae; South Korea	Liu Kuan-fu; Chinese Taipei	Zen Shiosaki; Japan
Individual Cadets	Kim Jeong-jae; South Korea	Liu Kuan-fu; Chinese Taipei	Jaynazh Jamias; Philippines
Individual Juniors	Lee Jin-yong; South Korea	Navin Pinthasute; Thailand	Amirali Alizadeh; Iran
Individual Juniors	Lee Jin-yong; South Korea	Navin Pinthasute; Thailand	Rodrigo Subauste; Peru
Individual under 30	Kim Sang-woo; South Korea	Ryan Real; United States	Nino Ontoy; Great Britain
Individual under 30	Kim Sang-woo; South Korea	Ryan Real; United States	Ian Matthew Corton; Philippines
Individual under 40	Zhu Yuxiang; China	Kanawat Sukcharoen; Thailand	Benjamin Harder; Denmark
Individual under 40	Zhu Yuxiang; China	Kanawat Sukcharoen; Thailand	Selgi Leblanc; France
Individual under 50	Kim Hak-dong; South Korea	Ali Salmani; Iran	Marcio Losada; Brazil
Individual under 50	Kim Hak-dong; South Korea	Ali Salmani; Iran	Heriberto Sanchez; Mexico
Individual under 60	Kim Sung-hoi; South Korea	Antonio Moreno Rodríguez; Spain	Juan Enrique Luna; Mexico
Individual under 60	Kim Sung-hoi; South Korea	Antonio Moreno Rodríguez; Spain	June Ninobla; Philippines
Individual under 65	Nader Khodamoradi; Iran	Lee Jung-chieh; Chinese Taipei	Robert Pace; Australia
Individual under 65	Nader Khodamoradi; Iran	Lee Jung-chieh; Chinese Taipei	Jeong Chan-woo; South Korea
Individual over 65	Hadi Torkashvand; Iran	Horacio Macchi; Argentina	Yeh Chin-shun; Chinese Taipei
Individual over 65	Hadi Torkashvand; Iran	Horacio Macchi; Argentina	Pak Jang-hee; United States

=== Women ===
Event	Gold	Silver	Bronze
Individual Cadets	Park Ji-hye; South Korea	Sofia Lee Kim; Mexico	Greta Mascherino; Italy
Individual Cadets	Park Ji-hye; South Korea	Sofia Lee Kim; Mexico	Sophia Liu; United States
Individual Juniors	Lin Yu-hsuan; Chinese Taipei	Seo Chae-won; South Korea	Liu Tsz Ki; Hong Kong
Individual Juniors	Lin Yu-hsuan; Chinese Taipei	Seo Chae-won; South Korea	Brisa Alekc; Mexico
Individual under 30	Lee Joo-yeong; South Korea	Eva Sandersen; Denmark	Liu Yuqing; China
Individual under 30	Lee Joo-yeong; South Korea	Eva Sandersen; Denmark	Ratchadawan Tapaenthong; Thailand
Individual under 40	Lee Ha-na; South Korea	Nguyễn Thị Lệ Kim; Vietnam	Franziska Schneegans; Germany
Individual under 40	Lee Ha-na; South Korea	Nguyễn Thị Lệ Kim; Vietnam	Anna Kim; Norway
Individual under 50	Kathy Do; United States	Ban Eu-na; South Korea	Vanesa Ortega Villodres; Spain
Individual under 50	Kathy Do; United States	Ban Eu-na; South Korea	Chen Liao-hsia; Chinese Taipei
Individual under 60	Elva Adams; United States	Hee-kyung Reimann; Germany	Maria Martínez Blancat; Argentina
Individual under 60	Elva Adams; United States	Hee-kyung Reimann; Germany	Soo-mi Jo Lee; Spain
Individual under 65	Leni Niedermayr; Austria	Yeap Swee Bee; Malaysia	Badri Ricciardelli; Canada
Individual under 65	Leni Niedermayr; Austria	Yeap Swee Bee; Malaysia	Maria Shaw; United States
Individual over 65	Eduarda Ferraz; Portugal	Bronwyn Butterworth; Australia	Iris Hitzemann; Germany
Individual over 65	Eduarda Ferraz; Portugal	Bronwyn Butterworth; Australia	Yuriko Takizawa; Japan

=== Team competitions ===
Event	Gold	Silver	Bronze
Pair Cadet	Chinese Taipei; Hsieh Min-yu; Teng Yun-jou	Hong Kong; Kadence Ng; Wong Yat Tung	Mexico; Sofia Lee Kim; Alan Kim Lee
Pair Cadet	Chinese Taipei; Hsieh Min-yu; Teng Yun-jou	Hong Kong; Kadence Ng; Wong Yat Tung	Philippines; Joniya Obiacoro; Alfonzo Tormon
Pair Juniors	Iran; Amirali Alizadeh; Zeynab Shahriyari	Philippines; Leno Subaste; Julianna Uy	Australia; Alexander Choo; Alicia Grigg
Pair Juniors	Iran; Amirali Alizadeh; Zeynab Shahriyari	Philippines; Leno Subaste; Julianna Uy	China; Li Yuqi; Zhang Jiahao
Pair under 30	Chinese Taipei; Tsai Ho-hsuan; Wu Ting-yu	Vietnam; Lê Trần Kim Uyên; Phạm Quốc Việt	Malaysia; Nur Abdul Karim; Jason Jun Wei
Pair under 30	Chinese Taipei; Tsai Ho-hsuan; Wu Ting-yu	Vietnam; Lê Trần Kim Uyên; Phạm Quốc Việt	Norway; Tuva Hatlen Kjodnes; Sune Ostli
Pair under 50	Vietnam; Châu Tuyết Vân; Nguyễn Thiên Phụng	Denmark; Benjamin Harder; Charlotte Pedersen	Iran; Forough Rahimi; Milad Yaghoubi
Pair under 50	Vietnam; Châu Tuyết Vân; Nguyễn Thiên Phụng	Denmark; Benjamin Harder; Charlotte Pedersen	Myanmar; San Shein Thet; Yamin K. Khine
Pair under 60	United States; Angelito Ong; Eleanor Thompson	Germany; Michael Bussmann; Hee-kyung Reimann	Austria; Martin Seelos; Karin Traxler
Pair under 60	United States; Angelito Ong; Eleanor Thompson	Germany; Michael Bussmann; Hee-kyung Reimann	Japan; Norikazu Ishihara; Hiroko Ota
Pair over 60	Germany; Sylvia Hohfeld; Manfred Stadtmuller	Australia; David Atkinson; Bronwyn Butterworth	Austria; Leni Niedermayr; Gerhard Reinsperger
Pair over 60	Germany; Sylvia Hohfeld; Manfred Stadtmuller	Australia; David Atkinson; Bronwyn Butterworth	Spain; José Manuel Marín; Beatriz Queiro
Team Male Cadet	South Korea; Cho Hyeon-ho; Kim Tae-yun; Lee Seung-chan	United States; Aiden Decolongon; David Gil; Jayden Kim	Philippines; Kian Castigador; Xian Gamata; Jaynazh Jamias
Team Male Cadet	South Korea; Cho Hyeon-ho; Kim Tae-yun; Lee Seung-chan	United States; Aiden Decolongon; David Gil; Jayden Kim	Chinese Taipei; Chang Tzu-lien; Shih Cho-yeh; Wang Bo-jyun
Team Female Cadet	United States; Evelyn Cheung; Sophia Liu; Emma Navarro	Chinese Taipei; Chen Min-huei; Lu Yen-chieh; Tsai Wei-en	South Korea; Kim Yu-na; Myeong Se-hui; Seol Ga-hui
Team Female Cadet	United States; Evelyn Cheung; Sophia Liu; Emma Navarro	Chinese Taipei; Chen Min-huei; Lu Yen-chieh; Tsai Wei-en	Mexico; Minerva Gomez; Fernanda Jiménez; Maya Preciado
Team Male Junior	South Korea; Kim Min-su; Lee Gun-hyeong; Lee Sang-woo	United States; Mikel Cho; Enoch Choi; Apollo Tan	United Kingdom; Gabriel Casaclang; Louis Exton; Peter Sellwoood
Team Male Junior	South Korea; Kim Min-su; Lee Gun-hyeong; Lee Sang-woo	United States; Mikel Cho; Enoch Choi; Apollo Tan	Vietnam; Dương Tấn Đạt; Nguyễn Thái Hà Anh; Pham Hoàng Minh
Team Female Junior	South Korea; Han Song-yeon; Lee Ru-da; Shin Yu-bin	Iran; Fatemeh Najafabadi; Zeynab Shahriyari; Dina Yaghoubi	Chinese Taipei; Chang Yi-hsuan; Hsu Yu-ting; Liang Chih-ning
Team Female Junior	South Korea; Han Song-yeon; Lee Ru-da; Shin Yu-bin	Iran; Fatemeh Najafabadi; Zeynab Shahriyari; Dina Yaghoubi	Vietnam; Lê Song Khang; Ngo Ha Linh; Võ Thị Huỳnh Như
Team Male under 30	United States; Eric Gun; David Lee; Bomin Kim	South Korea; Bae Jun-seok; Im Kwon-woo; Kang Wan-jin	Hong Kong; Chan Chung Yin; Liu Ho Yin; Lui Ching Nam
Team Male under 30	United States; Eric Gun; David Lee; Bomin Kim	South Korea; Bae Jun-seok; Im Kwon-woo; Kang Wan-jin	Iran; Alireza Ebrahimi; Yasin Vakili; Yasin Zandi
Team Female under 30	South Korea; Choi Ye-in; Han Da-hyun; Park Chae-won	Chinese Taipei; Huang Pin-chieh; Jian Xiang-ling; Kuo Yen-yu	Thailand; Pichamon Limpaiboon; Ornawee Srisahakit; Ratchadawan Tapaengthong
Team Female under 30	South Korea; Choi Ye-in; Han Da-hyun; Park Chae-won	Chinese Taipei; Huang Pin-chieh; Jian Xiang-ling; Kuo Yen-yu	Vietnam; Lê Ngọc Hân; Lê Trần Kim Uyên; Nguyễn Thị Y Bình
Team Male under 50	South Korea; Ji Ho-yong; Lee Jun; Song Gi-seong	Chinese Taipei; Chiang Chung-hsien; Chuang Chun-kai; Tsai Tien-cheng	Australia; An Ji-heon; Choi Min-seung; Choi Suk-won
Team Male under 50	South Korea; Ji Ho-yong; Lee Jun; Song Gi-seong	Chinese Taipei; Chiang Chung-hsien; Chuang Chun-kai; Tsai Tien-cheng	Iran; Mahdi Jamali Fashi; Ali Salmani; Milad Yaghoubi
Team Female under 50	Vietnam; Châu Tuyết Vân; Liên Thị Tuyết Mai; Nguyễn Thị Lệ Kim	South Korea; Cho Da-hye; Jang Myung-jin; Kim Eun-ju	Brazil; Mayara Baptista; Carolina Coutinho; Mariela de Abreu
Team Female under 50	Vietnam; Châu Tuyết Vân; Liên Thị Tuyết Mai; Nguyễn Thị Lệ Kim	South Korea; Cho Da-hye; Jang Myung-jin; Kim Eun-ju	United Kingdom; Sheena Au-Yeung; Georgina Ingram; Li Wenqi
Team Male under 60	Spain; Bernardo Hernando; Antonio Moreno Rogríguez; Seung-han Shin Jang	United States; Tiger Jung; Angelito Ong; Shun Seung-hee	Egypt; Yehia Abdelhamid; Emad Hasan; Said Abdel Mohamed
Team Male under 60	Spain; Bernardo Hernando; Antonio Moreno Rogríguez; Seung-han Shin Jang	United States; Tiger Jung; Angelito Ong; Shun Seung-hee	Hong Kong; Au Kit Tung; Chan King Lin; Kwok Chi Kuen
Team Female under 60	United States; Sheena Kim; Eleanor Thompson; Jan Trigg	Australia; Lucy Cleary; Carmela Hartnett; Pat Petrovski	Finland; Marita Jaakkola; Kirsimarja Raitasalo; Niina Virtala
Team Female under 60	United States; Sheena Kim; Eleanor Thompson; Jan Trigg	Australia; Lucy Cleary; Carmela Hartnett; Pat Petrovski	Hong Kong; Ma Cheuk Man; Theresa Tse; Yang Yin Hing
Team Male over 60	United States; Joseph Coughlin; Ronald Southwick; Dan Williams	United Kingdom; Colin Larkin; Michael Pejic; Ali Pourtaheri	Argentina; Jorge Arana; Edgardo Leiva; Horacio Macchi
Team Male over 60	United States; Joseph Coughlin; Ronald Southwick; Dan Williams	United Kingdom; Colin Larkin; Michael Pejic; Ali Pourtaheri	Australia; Chiang Cheuk Hung; Rob Schembri; Gary Thorpe
Team Female over 60	United States; Erica Linthorst; Tweedy Nguyen; Maria Shaw	United Kingdom; Virginia Brown; Jenny Furness; Marina Malaffo	Not awarded

== Medal summary: Freestyle Poomsae ==
=== Men ===
Event	Gold	Silver	Bronze
Individual Male under 17	Byeong Jae-young; South Korea	Chang Kai-hsin; Canada	Wang Yuxin; China
Individual Male under 17	Byeong Jae-young; South Korea	Chang Kai-hsin; Canada	Lo Lok In; Macau
Individual Male over 17	Eric Gun; United States	Yun Kyu-sung; South Korea	Darius Venerable; Philippines
Individual Male over 17	Eric Gun; United States	Yun Kyu-sung; South Korea	William Arroyo; Mexico

=== Women ===
Event	Gold	Silver	Bronze
Individual Female under 17	Lin Sitong; China	Hong Tae-mi; South Korea	Chang Yi-hsuan; Chinese Taipei
Individual Female under 17	Lin Sitong; China	Hong Tae-mi; South Korea	Manan Tongbanbor; Thailand
Individual Female over 17	Cha Ye-eun; South Korea	Eva Sandersen; Denmark	Allison Deguzman; United States
Individual Female over 17	Cha Ye-eun; South Korea	Eva Sandersen; Denmark	Cecilia Lee; Mexico

=== Pairs ===
Event	Gold	Silver	Bronze
Pair under 17	South Korea; Jang Han-sol; Kim Kwan-woo	China; Lin Sitong; Wang Yuxin	Canada; Chang Kai-hsin; Rachel Lee
Pair under 17	South Korea; Jang Han-sol; Kim Kwan-woo	China; Lin Sitong; Wang Yuxin	Philippines; Austine Macaraeg; Dean Venerable
Pair over 17	South Korea; Jung Hae-un; Kim Sung-jin	Philippines; Juvenile Crisostomo; Justin Macario	Chinese Taipei; Hsu Yu-jan; Ke Hsiang-shuo
Pair over 17	South Korea; Jung Hae-un; Kim Sung-jin	Philippines; Juvenile Crisostomo; Justin Macario	Thailand; Watcharakul Limjittrakorn; Tinpat Wisutsmot

=== Mixed Teams ===
Event	Gold	Silver	Bronze
Mixed Team under 17	Chinese Taipei; Cai Yu-kui; Chien Tsen-hai; Chien Yu-chia; Wang Yi-han; Wu Yu-hsuan	Thailand; Suchanan Injang; Supanut Ruangdam; Punnathorn Sirisom; Nicha Thaosakun; Manan Tongbanbor; Ratchaphol Yaibua	Vietnam; Hoàng Thị Trà My; Lê Đặng Ngọc Văn Minh; Nguyễn Quang Phúc; Trần Mai Anh; Trần Thanh Khánh Băng; Trương Vĩnh Khang
Mixed Team under 17	Chinese Taipei; Cai Yu-kui; Chien Tsen-hai; Chien Yu-chia; Wang Yi-han; Wu Yu-hsuan	Thailand; Suchanan Injang; Supanut Ruangdam; Punnathorn Sirisom; Nicha Thaosakun; Manan Tongbanbor; Ratchaphol Yaibua	Canada; Emma Chau; Jake Kang; Vincent Leung; Godwin Li; Macy Li; Ethan So
Mixed Team over 17	Vietnam; Hồ Thanh Ân; Nguyễn Ngọc Minh Hy; Nguyễn Thanh Hiền Linh; Nguyễn Thị Y Bình; Trần Đăng Khoa; Trần Phương Nhung	Mexico; Eder Cantero; Dayra Comparan; Miguel Díaz; Josue Galindo; Andrea Heinze; Roy Martínez	Italy; Valentina Arlotti; Beatrice Coradeschi; Luca Ferella; Luca Matellini; Andrea Norbiato; Federico Serain
Mixed Team over 17	Vietnam; Hồ Thanh Ân; Nguyễn Ngọc Minh Hy; Nguyễn Thanh Hiền Linh; Nguyễn Thị Y Bình; Trần Đăng Khoa; Trần Phương Nhung	Mexico; Eder Cantero; Dayra Comparan; Miguel Díaz; Josue Galindo; Andrea Heinze; Roy Martínez	Philippines; Juvenile Crisostomo; Justin Macario; Janna Oliva; Patrick King Perez; Darius Venerable; Jeus Yape

== Related ==
Also in 2024, the World Para Taekwondo Poomsae Championships were held as a separate event in Bahrain on 26 and 27 November.

== See also ==
- 2023 European Poomsae Championships
- 2025 European Poomsae Championships
- 2024 European Taekwondo Championships
- 2023 World Taekwondo Championships
- World Virtual Taekwondo Championships
