= Demographics of Vatican City =

- Population: ▲882 (237th)
  - Year: 2024
- Density: 2,205/km² (6th)
- Growth rate: ▼ -1.87% (2023)
- Birth rate: ▲36.29 births/1,000 population (2024)
- Death rate: ▼18.15 deaths/1,000 population (2024)
- Life expectancy: ▲84.16 years (2023)
- Net migration rate: 1,000 migrant(s)/1,000 population (2024)

Nationality
- Nationality: Vatican
- Major ethnic: Italians; Swiss people; Americans; Peruvians

Language
- Official: Italian, Latin
- Spoken: Italian, English

Vatican City had an estimated resident population of 506 in 2026, including non-citizens. It is ranked #237 in global population. Additionally, 372 Vatican citizens live abroad, primarily diplomats of the Holy See and cardinals in Rome. Vatican City remains the world's smallest country in both land area and population size.

The population of Vatican City includes clergy, religious members, lay employees of the state (like the Swiss Guard), and their families. In 2013, 13 families of Holy See employees lived in Vatican City, and by 2019, 20 children of Swiss Guards resided there. All citizens, residents and places of worship are Catholic. The city also hosts thousands of tourists and daily workers. An estimated 6.8 million tourists visit annually.

== Population ==
=== Population tables ===
Vatican City population on 26 June 2023
Sex	all		
Citizenship	Vatican		other
Residency	other	Vatican City	
Pope		1	
Cardinals	55	9	
Diplomats	317		
Swiss Guard		104	
Others		132	518
Total	618		518
Total	372	246	518
Total	372	764	
Total	1,136		

Vatican City population on 1 March 2011
Sex	all			male			female		
Citizenship	Vatican		other	Vatican		other	Vatican		other
Residency	other	Vatican City		other	Vatican City		other	Vatican City	
Pope		1			1				
Cardinals	43	30		43	30				
Diplomats	306			306					
Swiss Guard		86			86				
Other religious		50	197		49	102		1	95
Other lay		56	24		25	3		31	21
Total	572		221	540		105	32		116
Total	349	223	221	349	191	105		32	116
Total	349	444		349	296			148	
Total	793			645			148		

=== Female population ===
Women make up a small fraction of Vatican City's citizenship, constituting roughly 5.5% of its population. As of a 2011 report by the Herald Sun, there were just 32 female Vatican passport holders out of 572 citizens, with one being a nun. By 2013, Worldcrunch reported about 30 women citizens, a group that included two South American women, two Polish nationals, and three from Switzerland, with the majority of Vatican women being Italians.

==== Women citizens ====
Among the few women residing in Vatican City, one notable example was the daughter of an electrician employed by the Vatican; she eventually "lost her right to live" in the city upon getting married. Another resident, Magdalena Wolińska-Riedi, is a Polish translator and the wife of a member of the Swiss Guard.

Among the women with Vatican City citizenship, one serves as an officer in the Vatican's military, while two work as teachers, one at the high school level and the other in kindergarten, and another holds a role as an academic. Vatican City citizenship for women is often granted through marriage to a Vatican citizen, provided they are baptized Catholics. However, this citizenship is typically temporary, remaining valid only for the duration of their residence within the city-state.

==== Value of women ====
Historically, women in Vatican City faced significant restrictions, including the inability to open a bank account. However, during the tenures of Pope John Paul II and Pope Benedict XVI, there was a notable shift towards recognizing the value of women within the Vatican. Pope Benedict XVI appointed Ingrid Stampa, a woman, as one of his assistant editors and confidential advisers.

On April 21, 2013, The Telegraph reported that Pope Francis planned to appoint more women to key positions within the Vatican. In May 2019, he made a significant move by appointing three women as consultors to the General Secretariat for the Synod of Bishops on Young People, Faith, and Vocational Discernment. Additionally, the Vatican’s daily newspaper, L'Osservatore Romano, began publishing supplementary pages focused on women's issues.

Despite these changes, women are still not permitted to be ordained as priests or bishops. However, a commission is currently examining the possibility of allowing women to serve as unordained deacons.

===== Voting rights =====
The Pope, as the head of state of Vatican City and leader of the Catholic Church, is elected by the College of Cardinals, a body composed of senior church officials appointed by the Pope. The College operates as part of the Holy See and is responsible for electing a new Pope in a conclave upon the vacancy of the papal office.

The rank of cardinal is a prestigious position within the Church, but it is not a sacramental order; rather, it is a title conferred upon bishops and, in some cases, priests, granting them the responsibility of advising the Pope and, for those under the age of 80, participating in papal elections.

Currently, only men are eligible to become cardinals and, by extension, to be elected as Pope, in accordance with Catholic tradition. However, since the office of cardinal is not divinely instituted but rather a role established by ecclesiastical law, the Pope has the authority to modify its requirements. While no decision has been made to allow women to become cardinals, discussions regarding the role of women in the Church continue, particularly under recent papacies.

===== Divorce =====
Vatican City is one of two sovereign states that do not allow divorce, the other being the Philippines.

===== Abortion =====
The legal framework in Vatican City is primarily rooted in canon law, the body of laws governing the Catholic Church, and uses it as the principal source for legal interpretation. To support its governance, Vatican City has also adopted several Italian laws for practical implementation, such as the Italian penal code from 1929, though it incorporates certain modifications.

Both canon law, specifically Canon 1397 §2, and articles 381 to 385 of the Vatican's adapted penal code, categorically prohibit abortion without citing exceptions. However, article 49 of the penal code outlines the "principle of necessity" to save one's life, a provision that, according to the Italian penal code's original drafters, could technically allow abortion when necessary to save a woman's life. However, the Church's interpretation of canon law remains far stricter. The Church only condones an "indirect" abortion in cases where the procedure aims solely to save the woman's life, and where the fetus's death is an unintended, albeit anticipated, outcome.

This interpretation is grounded in the principle of double effect, which permits procedures such as the removal of a cancerous uterus or treatment for an ectopic pregnancy if the primary intent is to protect the woman's health, with the death of the fetus seen as an undesired consequence, rather than the aim of the procedure.

== Languages ==
Vatican City primarily uses Italian in official documents and daily operations, due to its central role in Vatican life and Italian-based tourism. Despite this, many other languages are used within Vatican City due to the diverse origins of its residents and its various institutions, such as the Holy See and the Swiss Guard.

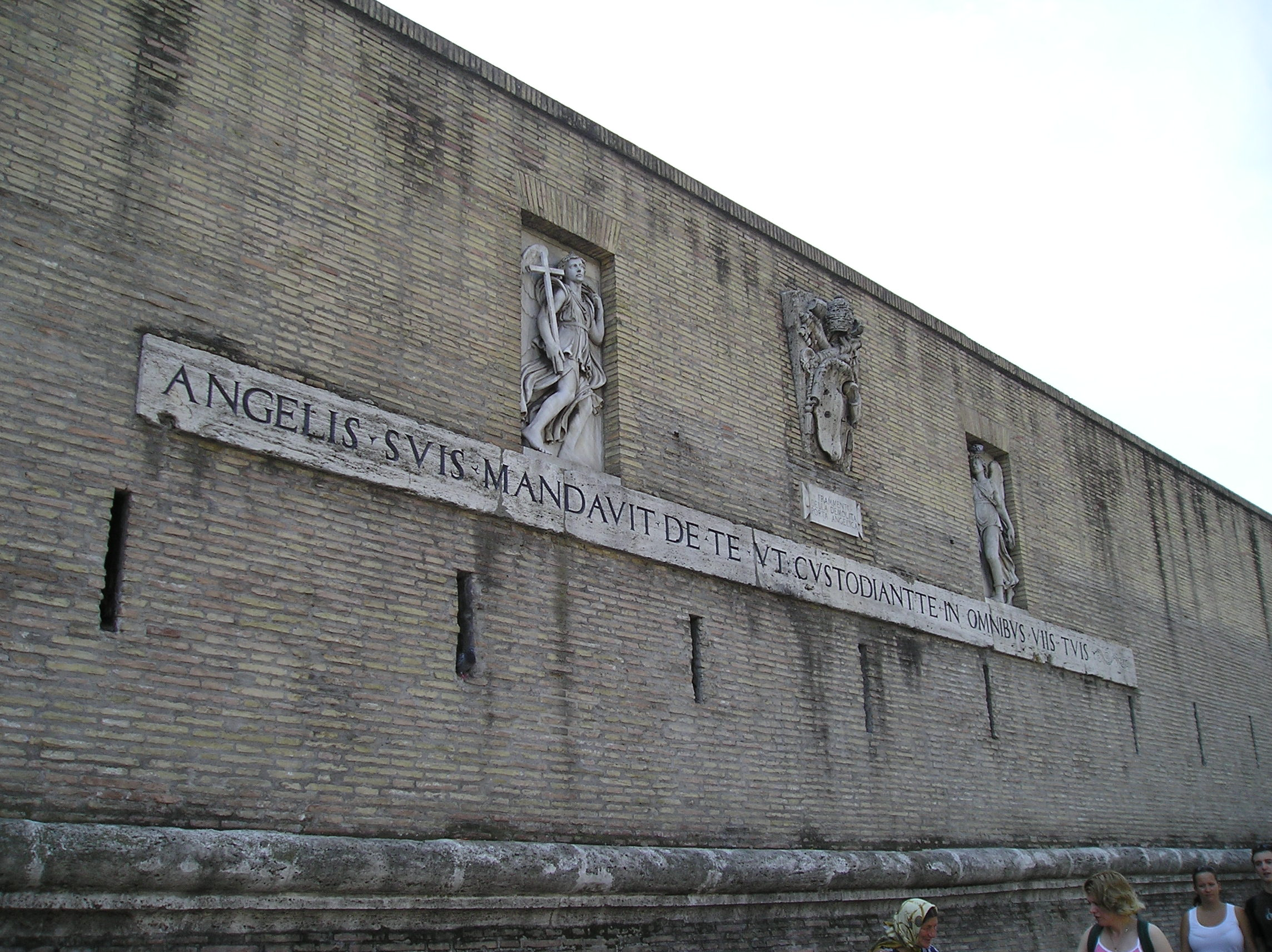
Inscription of Psalm 91:11 in Latin at Piazza del Risorgimento

Historically, Latin was the spoken language of the region during the Roman Empire and served as the official language of the Papal States. When the area became part of the Kingdom of Italy in 1870, Italian became its official language. After Vatican City's establishment in 1929 through the Lateran Treaty, the state did not designate an official language, although its laws are published in Italian in the Acta Apostolicae Sedis. Many of its buildings predate the state and contain inscriptions mainly in Latin, as well as in Italian, Greek, French, and German.

Latin remains the official language of the Holy See. Italian serves as the lingua franca for administration and diplomacy in Vatican City and has been the official language of the Synod of Bishops since 2014. French is occasionally used for diplomatic purposes.

The Swiss Guard uses Swiss German for commands, while guards take their loyalty oath in their respective native languages: German, French, Italian, or Romansh. Since the state's establishment, the popes' first languages have been Italian, Polish, German, Spanish, and English.

The language diversity extends into the Church's media presence; for instance, the Holy See's newspaper, L'Osservatore Romano, is published in multiple languages including Italian, English, French, German, Polish, Portuguese and Spanish, and its official website primarily uses Italian, with full versions in English, French, German, Portuguese, and Spanish, and partial versions in Arabic, Chinese, and Latin. Some content is offered in various other languages, including Albanian, Belarusian, Croatian, Czech, Dutch, Hebrew, Hungarian, Indonesian, Japanese, Korean, Lithuanian, Maltese, Polish, Russian, Slovak, Slovene, Swahili, and Ukrainian. Similarly, the Vatican News website provides content in a wide range of languages, including Albanian, Amharic, Arabic, Armenian, Belarusian, Bulgarian, Chinese, Croatian, Czech, English, Esperanto, French, German, Italian, Japanese, Korean, Latvian, Lithuanian, Hindi, Hungarian, Kannada, Malayalam, Macedonian, Polish, Portuguese, Romanian, Russian, Slovak, Slovene, Spanish, Swahili, Swedish, Tamil, Tigrinya, Ukrainian and Vietnamese.

== Citizenship ==
Unlike most countries, where citizenship is based on jus sanguinis, citizenship through descent, or jus soli, citizenship by birth within the territory, Vatican City grants citizenship based on jus officii, meaning citizenship is given due to an individual's appointment to a specific role in service to the Holy See. Citizenship typically ends when the person's role ceases, though it is extended to spouses and children of citizens, provided they live together within Vatican City. Some individuals may also reside in Vatican City without opting for citizenship.

In cases where a person loses Vatican citizenship and does not hold another nationality, they automatically acquire Italian citizenship under the terms of the Lateran Treaty. The Holy See, distinct from Vatican City as an entity, issues only diplomatic and service passports, whereas Vatican City issues ordinary passports for its citizens.

== Statistical oddities ==
Vatican City frequently stands out in per capita and per area statistical comparisons, primarily due to its tiny size and unique ecclesiastical function. For instance, because most citizenship-granting positions are held by men, Vatican City’s gender ratio skews significantly male, with several men per woman among citizens. Additionally, the high number of petty crimes against tourists creates an inflated per-capita crime rate, and the state also leads in per-capita wine consumption, largely because of sacramental wine usage in religious ceremonies.

These unusual metrics often make Vatican City an interesting outlier in global data comparisons. A humorous example of this is the hypothetical "Popes per km^{2}" statistic, which surpasses two popes per square kilometer due to the city-state's area being less than half a square kilometer.

360-degree view from the dome of St. Peter's Basilica, looking over the Vatican's Saint Peter's Square (center) and out into Rome, showing Vatican City in all directions

== Culture ==
=== Cultural heritage ===
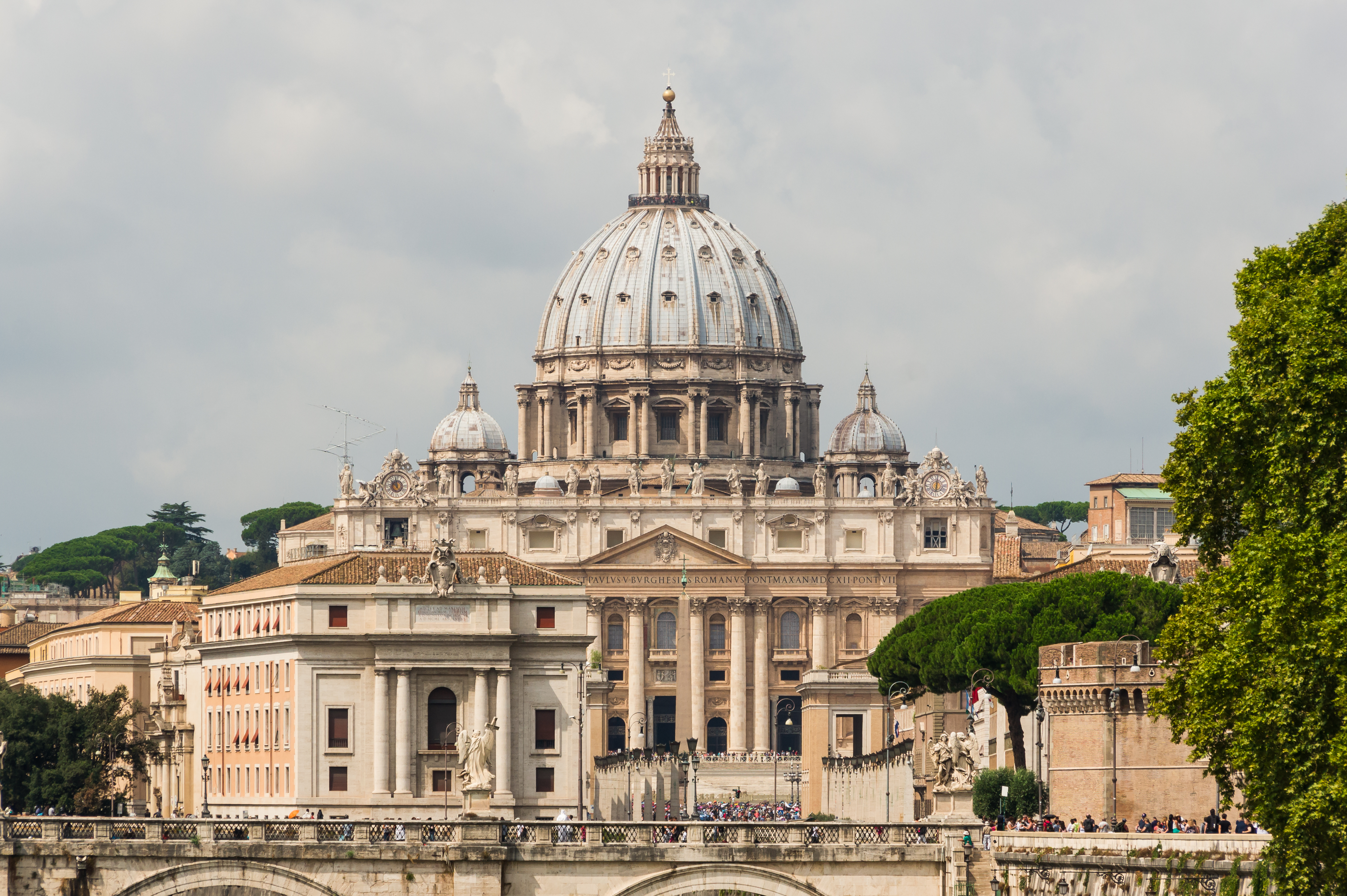
St. Peter's Basilica is one of the most renowned works of Renaissance architecture.

Vatican City is home to notable works of art and architecture. St. Peter's Basilica, a prominent example of Renaissance architecture, was designed by several architects, including Bramante, Michelangelo, Giacomo della Porta, Maderno, and Bernini. The Sistine Chapel is widely recognized for its frescoes, featuring works by artists such as Perugino, Domenico Ghirlandaio, and Botticelli, along with Michelangelo's ceiling and Last Judgment. The interiors of Vatican buildings also include contributions from artists like Raphael and Fra Angelico.

The Vatican Apostolic Library and the Vatican Museums' collections are valued for their historical, scientific, and cultural significance. Designated a UNESCO World Heritage Site in 1984, Vatican City is the only state entirely listed as such. It is also the sole UNESCO site recorded in the "International Register of Cultural Property under Special Protection" in accordance with the 1954 Hague Convention for the Protection of Cultural Property in the Event of Armed Conflict.

=== Science ===
In 1936, Pope Pius XI established the Pontifical Academy of Sciences, building on the foundation of the Pontifical Academy of New Lincei, founded by Pope Pius IX in 1847. Located in the Casina Pio IV, the Academy promotes academic freedom and encourages research in mathematics, physical sciences (including astronomy, Earth sciences, physics, and chemistry), and natural sciences (including medicine, neuroscience, biology, genetics, and biochemistry), while also engaging with epistemological and historical aspects of science. Its members have included notable scientists such as astrophysicist Martin John Rees, mathematician Cédric Villani, theoretical physicist Edward Witten, Nobel laureates in Chemistry Jennifer Doudna and Emmanuelle Charpentier, as well as geneticists Luigi Luca Cavalli-Sforza and Francis Collins, the head transplant pioneer Robert J. White, and the Nobel Prize in Physiology or Medicine Alexander Fleming.

Another Vatican-based institution, the Pontifical Academy of Social Sciences, addresses a wide range of fields, including anthropology, communication studies, information sciences, cybernetics, economics, education, geography, history, law, linguistics, political science, psychology, behavioral sciences, sociology and demography. The Pontifical Academy for Life, located at the San Callisto complex, focuses on bioethics and ethics related to technology.

The Vatican Observatory, which traces its origins to the 16th century, initially operated telescopes in Vatican City and at the Palace of Castel Gandolfo. However, light pollution has limited these facilities' effectiveness for research, leading to a partnership with the University of Arizona and the establishment of the Vatican Advanced Technology Telescope in Arizona. The Observatory remains active in astronomical research, contributing to areas such as cosmological models, stellar classification, binary stars, and nebulae. Additionally, it participates in philosophical interdisciplinary studies at the Center for Theology and the Natural Sciences in Berkeley, California and research on the history of astronomy thanks to its extensive library, which also includes a meteorite collection.

=== Sport ===
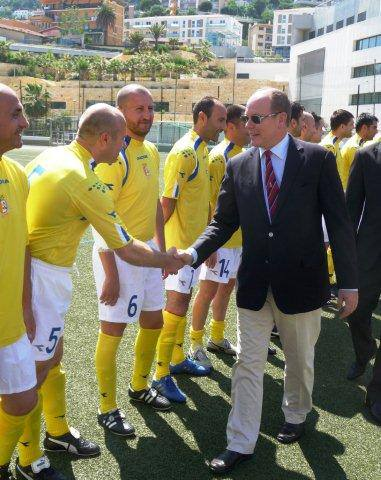
Albert II, Prince of Monaco greeting the men's football team in June 2013

Vatican City is not a member of the International Olympic Committee and does not participate in the Olympic Games. However, it has taken part in other international sporting events, such as the World Cycling Championships, the Championships of the Small States of Europe, and the Mediterranean Games. The nation has its own athletics association, Vatican Athletics.

Association football in Vatican City is overseen by the Vatican Amateur Sports Association, which organizes the national championship, known as the Vatican City Championship. This league includes eight teams, such as FC Guardia, representing the Swiss Guard, along with teams from the police and museum guard. The association also manages the Coppa Sergio Valci and the Vatican Supercoppa. Additionally, it oversees the Vatican City national football team, which is not affiliated with either UEFA or FIFA.

== Economics ==
The economy of Vatican City is primarily funded through the sale of stamps, coins, medals, and tourist souvenirs, alongside museum admission fees and publication sales. In 2016, Vatican City employed a total of 4,822 people.

Vatican City receives subsidies from the Italian state, including a free water supply, tax exemptions, and other forms of dedicated public funding.

Vatican City issues its own coins and stamps and has used the euro as its currency since January 1, 1999, through the Council Decision 1999/98 with the European Union. While euro banknotes are not issued by the Vatican, it began issuing euro coins on January 1, 2002. The issuance of these coins is tightly limited by treaty, with slightly higher allowances in years of a papal change. Due to their limited availability, Vatican euro coins are popular among collectors.

As of 2021, Vatican City reported budgeted revenue of €770 million, expenditures of €803 million, and a resulting deficit of €33 million. Vatican City’s industries include printing, the production of a limited amount of mosaics, and the manufacture of staff uniforms, along with global banking and financial operations.

Electricity is partially generated by solar panels, which produce up to 442 MWh, with the remainder supplied by Italy.

== Law ==
Vatican City law comprises various forms, with the canon law of the Catholic Church being the most significant. The state's governing bodies operate under the Fundamental Law of Vatican City State, while the Code of Penal Procedure regulates its tribunals, and the Lateran Treaty outlines its relationship with Italy.

=== Canonical laws ===
==== Canon law ====
Canon law holds the highest authority within the civil legal system of Vatican City. The Supreme Tribunal of the Apostolic Signatura, a dicastery of the Roman Curia and the top canonical tribunal, also serves as the final court of cassation in Vatican City’s civil legal system. Its responsibilities include handling appeals related to legal procedure and judicial competence. Under a 2008 law issued by Pope Benedict XVI, the civil legal system of Vatican City recognizes canon law as its first source of norms and first principle of interpretation. within the Vatican's civil legal system. Pope Francis has affirmed that principles of canon law are essential for interpreting and applying the laws of Vatican City.

==== Fundamental law ====
The civil government of Vatican City is governed by the Fundamental Law, which serves as its constitutional framework. Promulgated by Pope John Paul II on November 26, 2000, the Fundamental Law consists of 20 articles and took effect on February 22, 2001, the Feast of the Chair of St. Peter. This law replaced the previous Fundamental Law of Vatican City established by Pope Pius XI on June 7, 1929. All existing norms in Vatican City that conflicted with the new law were abrogated, and the original document, bearing the Seal of Vatican City State, was archived in the Archive of the Laws of Vatican City State, with the corresponding text published in the Supplement to the Acta Apostolicae Sedis. In April 2023, Pope Francis introduced a new Fundamental Law, which came into effect the same year.

==== Curia law ====
The apostolic constitution Praedicate evangelium regulates the Roman Curia, which provides assistance to the pope in governing the Catholic Church.

=== Police forces ===
The Corpo della Gendarmeria dello Stato della Città del Vaticano is the gendarmerie, and functions as the police and security force for Vatican City and the extraterritorial properties of the Holy See. This corps is responsible for various duties, including maintaining security, ensuring public order, conducting border and traffic control, performing criminal investigations, and providing general police services within Vatican City, including protecting the pope outside its borders. Comprising 130 personnel, it operates under the Security and Civil Defence Services Department, which also encompasses the Vatican Fire Brigade, an organ of the Governorate of Vatican City. The Pontifical Swiss Guards are specifically tasked with the protection of the pope and the Apostolic Palace.

According to Article 3 of the 1929 Lateran Treaty between the Holy See and Italy, St. Peter's Square, while part of Vatican City State, is primarily patrolled by the Italian police up to the steps leading to the basilica. Article 22 of the Lateran Treaty stipulates that the Italian government will seek the prosecution and detention of criminal suspects at the request of the Holy See, with the expenses incurred covered by Vatican City. Vatican City does not have its own prison system, apart from a few cells designated for pre-trial detention. Individuals sentenced to imprisonment by Vatican authorities serve their sentences in Italian prisons, with the costs borne by Vatican City.

The Vatican Gendarmerie maintains a limited number of prison cells. Under the provisions of the Lateran Treaty, individuals convicted of crimes are incarcerated in Italian prisons.

=== Crime ===
Crime in Vatican City primarily involves purse snatching, pickpocketing, and shoplifting, typically committed by tourists targeting other tourists. St. Peter's Square, with its high tourist traffic, is a common area for such incidents.

Vatican City's small size leads to some statistical anomalies. With 18 million visitors each year, petty theft is the most frequent crime, often involving tourists as both perpetrators and victims. In 1992, based on a population of 455, there were 397 civil offenses, equating to a crime rate of 0.87 offenses per person, and 608 penal offenses, or 1.33 per capita.
