= Vasa =

Vasa may refer to:

== Places ==
- Vaşa, Azerbaijan
- Vasa County, a historic county in modern-day Finland
- Vaasa or Vasa, Finland
- Vasa, Rajasthan, a village in Sirohi District, Rajasthan, India
- Vasa, Palghar, a village in Maharashtra, India
- Väsa, a village in Dalarna, Sweden
- Vasa Loch, a brackish lagoon in Shapinsay, Orkney Islands, Scotland, UK
- Vasa Township, Goodhue County, Minnesota, U.S.

== Other uses ==
- Vasa (name), a surname and given name (including a list of people with the name)
- Vasa (ship), a Swedish warship that sank in 1628
- House of Vasa, a medieval Swedish noble family, the royal house of Sweden 1523–1654 and of Poland 1587–1668
- Order of Vasa, a Swedish order of chivalry, awarded to citizens of Sweden
  - Vasa Medal, a Swedish medal
- vasa gene, a gene that is essential for germ cell development
- Vasa IFK, a Finnish football club
- Vasa parrot, a genus of parrots from Madagascar
- Vasa Museum, a museum in Stockholm, Sweden
- Vatican Amateur Sports Association

== See also ==
- Vaasa (disambiguation)
- Wasa (disambiguation)
- Wausa, Nebraska, named after Gustav Vasa, but with a slightly different spelling
