= Musei Vaticani (football club) =

Association football club in Vatican City

- Full name: Football Club Musei Vaticani New Team
- Founded: 1966 (60 years ago) as SS Hermes
- Ground: Campo Cardinale Francis Joseph Spellman; Rome, Italy
- Capacity: 500
- Owner: Eyal Ron
- Chairman: Antonio Nigrelli
- Manager: Giancarlo Taraglio
- League: Vatican City Championship
- 2022: 6th

Musei Vaticani is a Vatican football club that currently plays in the Vatican City Championship, the top level of football in Vatican City. The team, like all Vatican clubs, plays its matches at the Campo Cardinale Francis Joseph Spellman in Rome, Italy. The current president is Matteo Scianca and the current manager is Giancarlo Taraglio. The squad consists of employees of the Vatican Museums. With three titles, they are the most successful club in the history of the Vatican Supercoppa.

== History ==
Musei Vaticani was formed in 1966, becoming the first club in the Vatican, with the squad consisting of caretakers, restorers and servicemen. The club was originally known as SS Hermes because most of the members were employed in the Ottagono Courtyard of the Pio Clementino Museum where there is a copy of Prassitele's statue of the mythical messenger of gods Hermes.

== Current management ==
As of 25 July 2017

Name	Position
Beni Zisman	President
Alessandro Umbro	Vice-president
Luca Caravella - Matteo Scianca	Technical directors
Giancarlo Tarraglio	Head coach

== Honours ==
- Vatican City Championship Winners (3): 1982/1983, 2014/15, 2015/16
- Coppa Sergio Valci Winners (4): 1985/86, 2007/08, 2008/09, 2014/15
- Supercoppa Winners (3): 2007/08, 2008/09, 2015/16
