= Wasa =

Wasa or WASA may refer to:

== Places ==
- Wasa, Cameroon, a town in Extrême-Nord region
- Wasa, British Columbia, Canada, a settlement
- Wasa Lake, British Columbia, Canada
- Vaasa, Finland, a town, formerly spelled Wasa
- Wasa (Tanzanian ward), a ward in Iringa Rural district

== Ships and shipping ==
- Vasa (ship), 17th-century Swedish warship, formerly spelled Wasa
- SS Wasa (1907) a Swedish cargo ship sold to Norway in 1925 and renamed SS Henry
- Wasa 30, a Swedish sailboat
- Wasa Line, a former Finnish shipping company

== WASA ==
- District of Columbia Water and Sewer Authority, Washington DC
- Water and Sewerage Authority, Trinidad and Tobago
- Water Supply and Sewerage Authority, Bangladesh
- Western Action Shooting Association
- Western Australia Softball Association
- WASA-LD, a low-power television station licensed to serve Port Jervis, New York, United States

== Other uses ==
- Wasabröd, a Swedish company that produces crispbread
- Wasa people, a people of Ghana
- Wasa language, a variety of the Akan languages of Ghana and eastern Ivory Coast
- Wasa Research Station, a Swedish research facility in Antarctica, established in 1988/1989
- IK Wasa, a Swedish sports club
- Legion Wasa, a Swedish political party

== See also ==
- Wasa Wasa, an album by Edgar Broughton Band
- Wasa, an alternate spelling of the name of the Swedish House of Vasa
- Vasa (disambiguation)
- Hwasa, South Korean singer (born 1995)
