= Rappresentativa OPBG =

Association football team from Vatican City

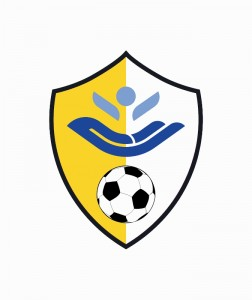
- Full name: Rappresentativa Ospedale Pediatrico Bambino Gesù
- Founded: 25 October 2015; 10 years ago
- President: Alessandro Adducci
- League: Vatican City Championship
- 2023: 1st

Rappresentativa OPBG is a Vatican football team, made up of employees from the Ospedale Pediatrico Bambino Gesù children's hospital in Rome, which is under extraterritorial jurisdiction by the Holy See.

== History ==
Rappresentativa OPBG was founded on 25 October 2015, when it played a match against a Vatican Amateur Sports Association representative team to raise funds for meal vouchers for the families of hospital patients. The team first competed in the 2016–17 Vatican City Championship, where they finished third behind Santos F.C. and Musei Vaticani. That season, they also won their first trophy, the Coppa Sergio Valci, beating Santos 4–2 in a penalty shoot-out during the final, which had ended in a 0–0 draw.

On 21 September 2018, the team played their first derby match, a friendly against the Polo Didattico Frassati, a team made up of nursing students from the hospital, which ended in an 8–8 draw.

During the 2018–19 season, they won the league title and finished the season unbeaten, winning 10 matches and drawing four, becoming the first team in the Vatican City to go unbeaten in a league season. In the 2021–22 season, they won a domestic treble, winning the Vatican City Championship, Coppa Sergio Valci, and Supercoppa. After winning the 2022–23 Vatican City Championship, the team did not compete in the 2023–24 season.

== Honours ==
- Vatican City Championship: 2017–18, 2018–19, 2021–22, 2022–23
- Coppa Sergio Valci: 2016–17, 2021–22, 2022–23
- Supercoppa: 2018, 2022

== Women's football ==
The OPBG's women's football team was launched on 10 June 2018, and played in the first women's football match in the Vatican City against a team of female employees in the Holy See.
