= Campo Pio XI =

Football stadium in Rome, Italy

- Interactive map of Campo Pio XI
- Full name: Cavalieri di Colombo Campo Pio XI
- Location: Via Santa Maria Mediatrice, 22; Rome, Italy
- Coordinates: 41.8969°N 12.4464°E
- Capacity: 500
- Surface: Artificial turf

Construction
- Opened: 1926

Tenants
- Vatican City national football team Vatican City women's national football team Vatican City Championship; Coppa Sergio Valci; Supercoppa; Clericus Cup

Website
- Official Website

Campo Pio XI is an association football stadium in Rome, Italy. The stadium hosts all of Vatican City's football activities, including the Vatican City Championship, the Clericus Cup, and the Vatican City national football teams. It is also home to the Petriana Calcio, an amateur youth multi-sport club.

== Overview ==
The Pio XI multi-sport complex is located on an 18-acre plot of land in Rome some 400 meters from Vatican City. It has a capacity of 500 spectators, and is equipped with artificial turf and floodlights. The field is known for having a clear, unobstructed view of Saint Peter's Basilica.

== History ==
The Campo Pio XI stadium is part of one of several sports complexes built, funded, and maintained by the Italian Knights of Columbus. The fraternal organization began building free recreational facilities for Roman Catholic youth in 1920 after Pope Benedict XV asked the Order to do so. This was due to the Pope recognising that the Church having the use of its own sports pitch would be beneficial to allow people to play sports under a Catholic ethos. The field was consecrated and blessed by Cardinal Pietro Gasparri, Vatican Secretary of State, in May 1926.

Serie A club AS Roma hosts youth tournaments at the stadium.

On 10 June 2018, during Vatican Family Day, the stadium hosted the first Vatican women's football match following that year's Vatican Super Cup. Campo Pio XI is also the home to the Vatican City women's national football team.

== International matches ==
After playing its first three full-internationals at the Stadio Pio XII, the stadium hosted the Vatican City national football team for the first time on 10 May 2014.

=== List of matches ===
Win Draw Loss

10 May 2014	Vatican City	0–2	Monaco
		Report

29 April 2017	Vatican City	0–0	Monaco
		Report

23 March 2019	Vatican City	2–2	Raetia
		Report	Mirco Oswald (2)
