= Swiss Guard Band =

Military band in Vatican City

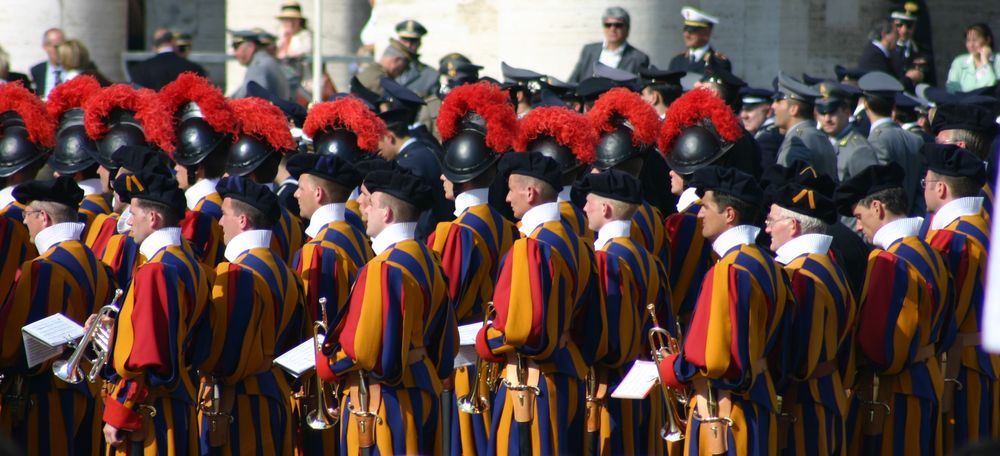
Members of the band during a ceremony in May 2006.

The Swiss Guard Band (Latin: Pontificia Cohors Helvetica; Italian: Banda della Guardia Svizzera; German: Musik der Schweizergarde; French: Musique de la garde suisse) also known as the Guard-Internal Banda is a military band from the Vatican City that is a musical sub-unit of the Pontifical Swiss Guard, which serves as protection for the Pope and the Apostolic Palace.

It has since 2015 been led by François Fournier.

There is a band located in Switzerland strictly consisting of band veterans.

== History ==
The modern band was first founded in the year 1881. The first instrumentalists in the Swiss Guard included drummers and pipers, both of which were service in the unit in the 1500s, Between the unit's establishment and 1881, there was no formal bands for the guardsmen.

One of the first photographs of the band is dated back to the 1890s.

In 2006, on the occasion 500th anniversary of the foundation of the Guard, the regular band was officially recognized as a special unit of the corps.

== Duties ==
It officially performs at the pleasure of the Pope, often playing at Papal inaugurations. The Swiss Guard Band annually performs during a Christmas concert on St. Peter's Square and all official National Day (24 April) celebrations.

In early December 2012, it released a Christmas CD. The funds from its sale benefited two charities in Switzerland and Zimbabwe.

It cannot perform outside the Vatican walls without the direct permission of the Secretariat of State.

== Structure ==
The structure of the Band is as follows:

- Maestro (appointed by the guard's commandant)
- President (responsible for the organization of the band)
- Governing Committee
- Musicians

Because the composition of the musicians always changes every few months, the band does not participate in very many major events during a given year. An example of this is the Federal Music Festival in Montreux, which it participated in for the first time in 25 years in 2016. The first time it participated in the festival was in 1991, which was the first time it had left the Vatican walls as a group.

== Uniform distinctions ==
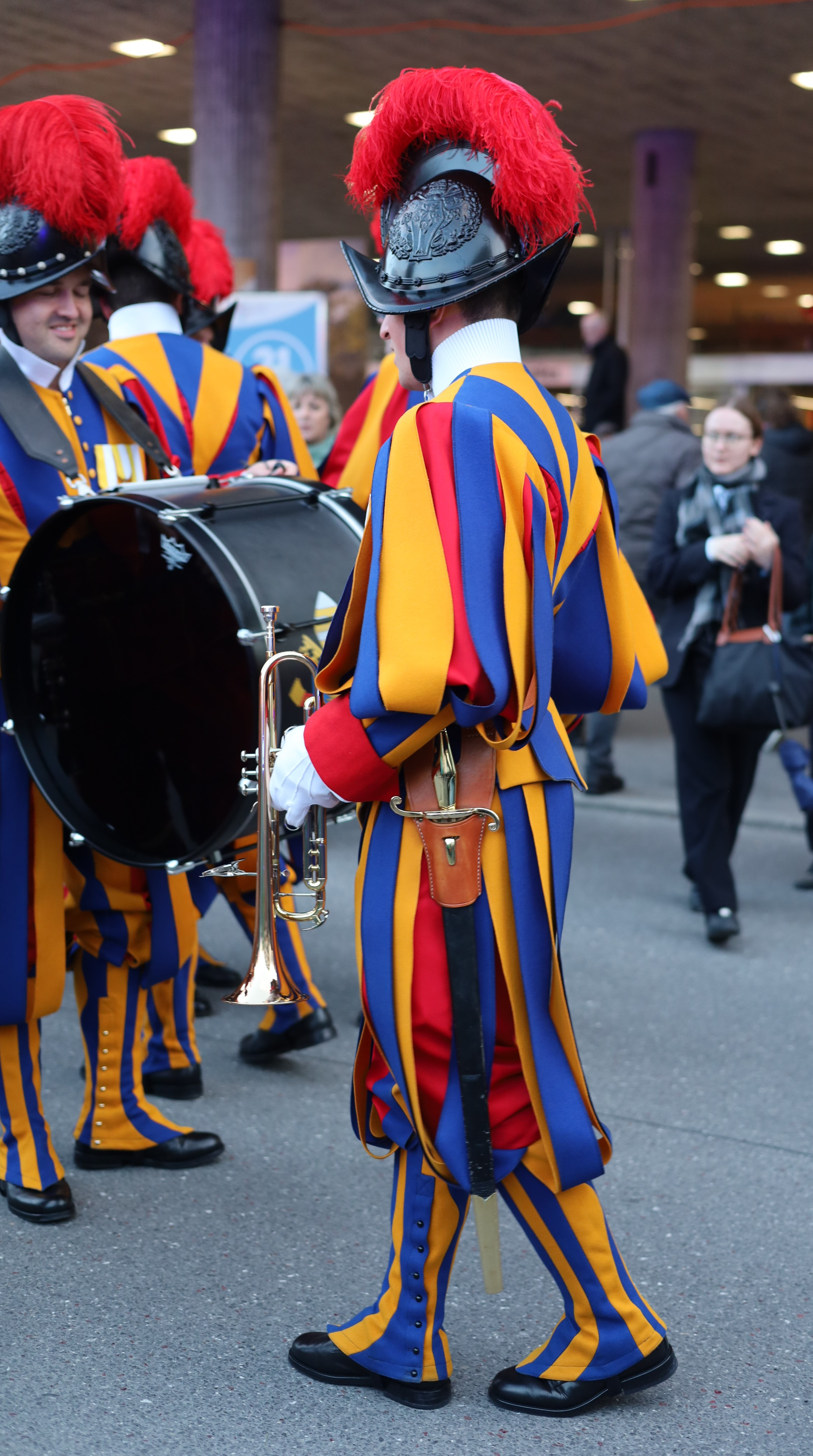
Uniform

The musicians of the band wear the same uniform as regular Swiss Guards of their rank, i.e. musicians at rank of Corporal and below wear the distinctive tricolour uniform commonly associated with the guard, whilst musicians at rank of Sergeant wear the black tunic and crimson breeches of normal Sergeants. In neither case are there any uniform distinctions.

The drummers of the band, however, wear a slightly different uniform. In this variant, the red slashes in the sleeves and cuffs on normal enlisted Guard uniforms are coloured black on drummer uniforms, and the helmets have a black and yellow plume. Drummers also wear their drums and equipment on a leather crossbelt.

== See also ==
- FC Guardia
- Band of the Corps of Gendarmerie of Vatican City
