= Vaso =

Vaso may refer to the following items:

- Vaso, India, a village in Kheda District Of Gujarat, India
- Vaso (name), several individuals with the name Vaso
- Vaso-occlusive crisis
- Voronezh Aircraft Production Association
