= Vatican City national football team =

Men's association football team

Vatican City
- Association: ASD Vaticano
- Head coach: Massimiliano Strappetti
- Home stadium: Campo Pio XI
- FIFA code: VAT
First colours	Second colours

First international
- Unofficial; Vatican City 3–0 Austrian journalists (Austria) (1985); Official; Vatican City 0–0 San Marino Amateurs (Rome, Italy; 22 November 1994)

Biggest win
- Unofficial; Vatican City 9–1 Station Carabinieri of Rome (Rome, Italy, 3 February 2011)

Biggest defeat
- Unofficial; Borussia Mönchengladbach 21–4 Vatican City (Mönchengladbach, Germany; 13 August 2016); Official; Palestine 9–1 Vatican City (al-Khader, Palestine; 1 June 2012)

VIVA World Cup
- Appearances: 0
- Best result: Withdrew (2010)

The Vatican City national football team (Italian: Selezione di calcio della Città del Vaticano) is the football team that represents Vatican City under the control of the Vatican Amateur Sports Association, headquartered in the Vatican's Cortile di San Damaso. The Vatican City football association was founded in 1972. Its current president is Domenico Ruggiero. Massimiliano Strapetti, an Italian, is the current head coach.

The team played its first match in 1985, a 3–0 victory against a representative of Austrian journalists. In 2018, the Vatican also created a women's representative team.

== Overview ==
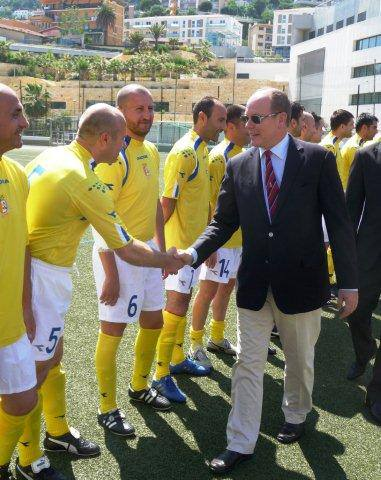
Albert II, Prince of Monaco greeting team in June 2013

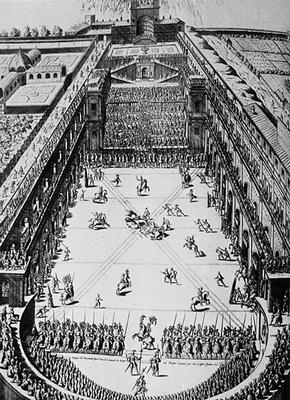
A carousel in the Cortile del Belvedere in 1565, 44 years after the first Calcio Fiorentino match was held in the Vatican.

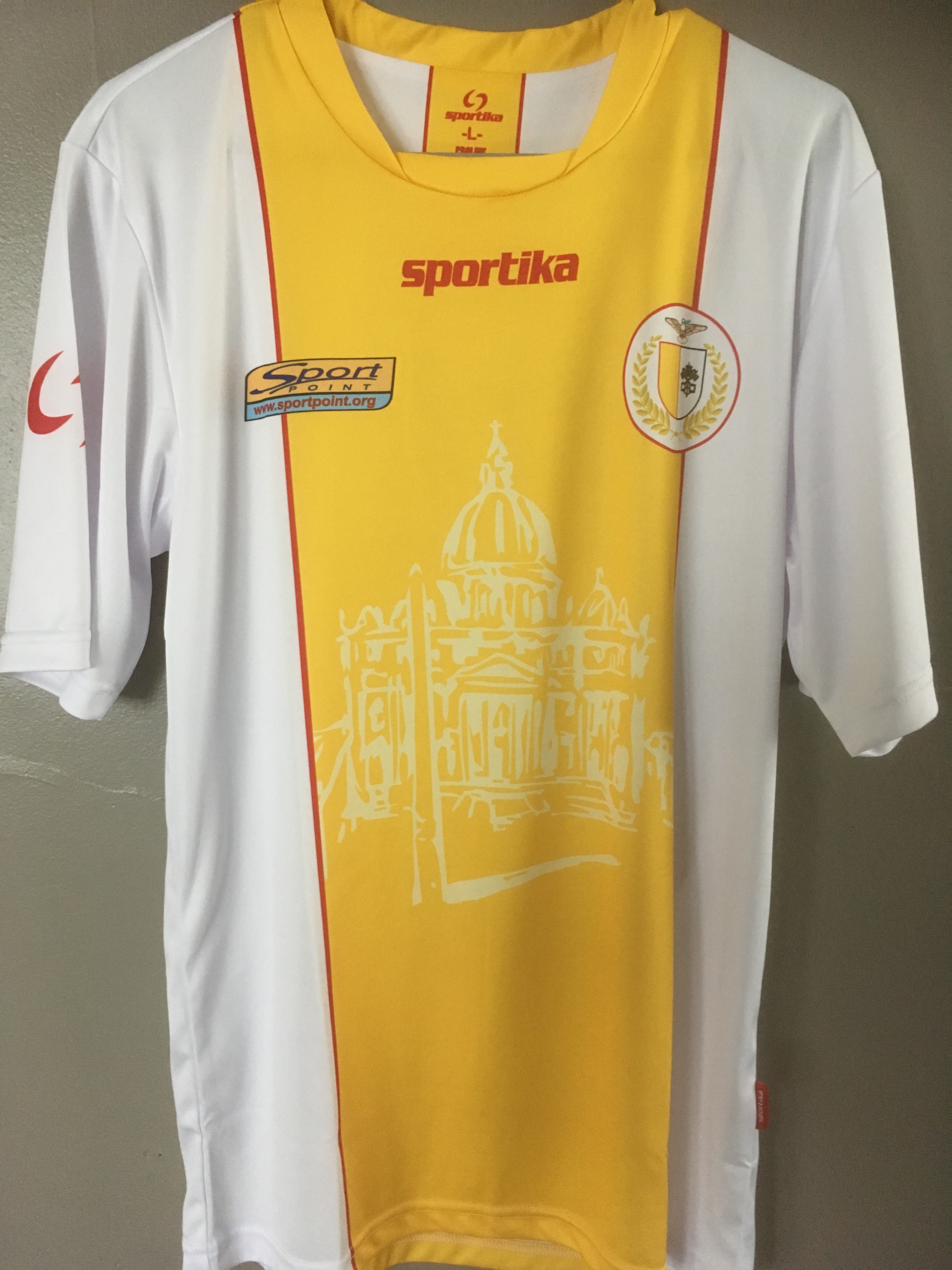
Jersey worn by Vatican City in April 2017 during its friendly match with Monaco

In 2004, Pope John Paul II established a Vatican sports department with the aim of "reinvigorating the tradition (of sport) within the Christian community". In 2006, Cardinal Secretary of State Tarcisio Bertone suggested that the Vatican could field a team of men from Catholic seminaries. About the prospect, the cardinal stated, "If we just take the Brazilian students from our Pontifical universities we could have a magnificent squad." The cardinal also noted that in the 1990 FIFA World Cup, there were 42 players in the final round who attended Salesian training centres worldwide. For example, Marcelino, Spanish hero of the 1964 European Nations' Cup, was a former seminarian. It was Bertone's proposal that the Vatican's players, even if accepted by UEFA, would be drawn from the population within the Catholic Church worldwide, not just citizens of Vatican City. He was unclear at the time whether the Vatican would grant these players Vatican citizenship to make this possible.

With the smallest population of any nation, approximately 900, it is difficult to form a squad. The Vatican City squad consists entirely of employees of the Vatican: police officers, postal workers, government officials and members of the Pontifical Swiss Guard, the Vatican's de facto army, charged with protecting the pope. Since most Vatican citizens are members of the Swiss Guard, they cannot be amassed in large numbers for a long time. Therefore, the national team has played only a few rare international matches, often drawing a fair amount of interested press. When Vatican City played its first match in 2002, only one player, Marcello Rosati, had a Vatican passport. In 2010, Vatican City was invited to participate in the Viva World Cup by the N.F.-Board and were expected to participate but were unable to do so because they could not assemble a 15-man roster. In total, Vatican City have played only four full international matches against other nations, one draw and three defeats to Monaco in 2002, 2011, 2013, and 2014 respectively.

In addition to its full international matches, the team has played a friendly match, its first, against the San Marino reserve team in 1994. The final score of that match is believed to be a 0–0 draw but Steve Menary's book 'Outcasts: The Lands that FIFA Forgot' states that Vatican insiders told him that the match ended 1–1. In 2010, the Vatican organized a team to play a friendly game against Palestine. However, the team was made up of Catholic priests and was not considered the Vatican City national team. In 2006, the Vatican City played SV Vollmond, a team from Switzerland, at Stadio Petriana with Vatican City prevailing 5–1. The team has also competed against a representative team from the Diocese of Limburg. In September 2016 the team participated in a triangular tournament at the Manlio Scopigno Stadium in Rieti to raise funds for earthquake victims. Former Italian international Simone Perrotta also participated in the tournament.

In April 2019 it was announced that the team had signed its first-ever sponsor, Poderi di San Pietro, a family-owned winery in Milan. The agreement was reached after ensuring that the organization met the strict ethical criteria established by the team. Previously, the Association was approached by a sports betting organization offering a very large sponsorship but was rejected for not aligning with those ethical standards.

== The Vatican's stance on football ==
Vatican footballing history began on 7 January 1521 when the first match of Calcio Fiorentino was played in the Vatican in the Cortile del Belvedere, in the presence of Pope Leo X.

The first Vatican league was created in 1973 and was first won by employees of L'Osservatore Romano, the newspaper of the Holy See.

The Vatican has typically expressed strong support for football. Pope John Paul II was reportedly a goalkeeper in his youth in Poland, and an ardent supporter of Cracovia Kraków. Late German pope Pope Benedict XVI was an ardent supporter of Bayern Munich since his youth growing up in Bavaria, Germany. Benedict is quoted as saying, "The sport of football can be a vehicle of education for the values of honesty, solidarity and fraternity, especially for the younger generation." In October 2007, the Pope was presented with a #16 shirt (in reference to the sixteenth use of his papal name) by Serie B side Ancona after Benedict supported their initiative to become a "beacon of morality" by adopting an "innovative, ethical model of practising football".

In 2010, Benedict and the Vatican reaffirmed their belief that football should be a beacon of morality by criticizing Serie A after matches for the upcoming season were scheduled at 12:30pm on Sundays to appease pay-per-view companies wishing to spread out Serie A matches over the weekend. The Vatican previously questioned the league's decision to play matches on Sundays at all, but "I consider this a truly harmful development," Monsignor Carlo Mazza told Tuttosport. "Putting people in front of the television screen at 12.30 CET, when they are having lunch with their families, to me seems like a 'pitch invasion' on life." Additionally, on 18 December 2006, Tarcisio Bertone, Cardinal Secretary of State of the Holy See, stated, but only in jest, that he did not preclude the possibility that the Vatican, in the future, could put together a football team of great value, that could play on the same level as, Roma, Internazionale and Milan or Genoa. The Argentinian pope, Pope Francis was an ardent fan of his hometown club San Lorenzo, and exhibited disappointment when Argentina lost the 2014 World Cup final against Germany.

== FIFA membership ==
Vatican City is one of only nine fully recognized sovereign states the national teams of which are not FIFA members. The others are the Federated States of Micronesia, Kiribati, the Marshall Islands, Monaco, Nauru, Palau, Tuvalu, and the United Kingdom (though the UK's four "home nations"—England, Scotland, Wales and Northern Ireland—have individual FIFA teams each of which is also a member of the IFAB).

In 2006, UEFA spokesperson William Gaillard told a media outlet that he saw no reason why Vatican City should not have a national team in international competitions. He said, "We already have states of 30,000 citizens like San Marino, Liechtenstein, and Andorra. If the Vatican wants to become a member of UEFA all it has to do is apply. If it meets the requirements, it will be accepted". At that time Cardinal Tarcisio Bertone insisted that the Vatican's football future lies only in amateur games and competitions.

In May 2014, Domenico Ruggerio, president of the national football association, reinforced Bertone's words from eight years prior, stating that "I prefer to be amateur...To join FIFA, at that level, will be like a business" after stating "The important message of friendship and love is demonstrated by the sport — the real sport, not the business that is in football these days...It is not just important to win a match; it is how you carry yourself." Therefore, that, he added, meant that "the ethos of the Vatican’s soccer team was at odds with FIFA membership."

In an April 2019 interview Danilo Zennaro, football director of Vatican City, told the St. Galler Tagblatt that the association would also not seek membership in an alternate confederation like ConIFA because of "political reasons" such as the diplomatic strife that would ensue from being in the same organization as breakaway regions and disputed territories.

In May 2022, the association celebrated the conclusion of its fiftieth anniversary. Despite a history of contrary comments, among the topics discussed was the possibility of the association joining UEFA. It was revealed that Pope Francis spoke with UEFA President Aleksander Čeferin about the possibility when the latter visited the Pope ahead of the UEFA Euro 2020 final.

== Kit ==
In the past, the kit has been provided by Diadora. The shorts were all white while the top is solid yellow with a narrow blue and white line around the right upper quadrant of the body. The team's kit was then provided by Sportika SA until July 2021. The kit had an image of Saint Peter's Basilica ghosted on the front.

In July 2021 the association introduced a new kit by Joma. For the first time, the kits became readily available to the public as they were sold in the gift shop of the Vatican Museums with the profits benefitting Pope Francis's works of charity. The kit included a badge on the arm commemorating the fiftieth anniversary of the Vatican football association.

== Complete international results ==
22 November 1994 Friendly	Vatican City	0–0	San Marino Amateurs	Rome
				Stadium: Campo Pio XI

23 November 2002 Friendly	Vatican City	0–0	Monaco	Albano Laziale
				Stadium: Stadio Pio XII

7 May 2011 Friendly	Vatican City	1–2	Monaco	Albano Laziale
	Quarto (??)	Report		Stadium: Stadio Pio XII

12 June 2011 Friendly	Palestine	9–1	Vatican City	al-Khader
				Stadium: Al-Khader Stadium

22 June 2013 Friendly	Monaco	2–0	Vatican City	Cap-d'Ail
		Report		Stadium: Stade Municipal Cap-d'Ail

10 May 2014 Friendly	Vatican City	0–2	Monaco	Rome
		Report		Stadium: Campo Pio XI

29 April 2017 Friendly	Vatican City	0–0	Monaco	Rome
		Report		Stadium: Campo Pio XI

23 March 2019 Friendly	Vatican City	2–2	Raetia	Rome
		Report		Stadium: Campo Pio XI

24 April 2022 Friendly	Vatican City	2–4	Elba	Capoliveri
		Report		Stadium: Polisport Capoliveri

== Head-to-head record ==
As of 24 April 2022

Team	Pld	W	D	L	GF	GA	GD	WPCT
Elba	1	0	0	1	2	4	−2	0.00
Monaco	5	0	2	3	1	6	−5	0.00
Palestine	1	0	0	1	1	9	−8	0.00
Raetia	1	0	1	0	2	2	0	0.00
San Marino Amateurs	1	0	1	0	0	0	0	0.00
Total	9	0	4	5	6	21	−15	0.00

Source: Results

== Unofficial results ==
No.	Date	Venue	Opponents	Score	Competition	Vatican City scorers	Ref.
1	1985		(Austria) Austrian journalists	3–0	Friendly	Unknown	
2	1985		(United Nations) Selection of UN officials	3–3	Friendly	Unknown	
3	3 February 2006	Campo Pio XI, Rome	(Switzerland) SV Vollmond	5–1	Friendly	Unknown	
4	18 June 2007		(Italy) Nazionale Italiana Religiosi	3–0	Friendly	Unknown	
5	23 October 2010		(Italy) Guardia di Finanza	0–1	Friendly		
6	3 February 2011	Rome	(Italy) Station Carabinieri of Rome	9–1	Friendly	Unknown	
7	10 August 2014	Mönchengladbach	(Germany) Borussia Mönchengladbach	1–8	Friendly	Unknown	
8	14 May 2015		(Italy) Nazionale Sindaci Italiana	5–3	Friendly	Unknown	
9	17 June 2015	Campo Pio XI, Rome	(Saxony-Anhalt) Lutherstadt Wittenberg	1–0	Friendly	Unknown	
10	20 June 2015	Campo Pio XI, Rome	(Liechtenstein) FC Azzurri Schaan	2–2	Friendly	Unknown	
11	12 May 2016	Campo Pio XI, Rome	(Italy) Associazione Italiana Arbitri Seregno	1–1	Friendly	Unknown	
12	13 August 2016	Mönchengladbach	(Germany) Borussia Mönchengladbach	4–21	Friendly	Unknown	
13	7 November 2016	Stadio Pietro Fortunati, Pavia	(Italy) Fondazione Ospedale San Matteo	1–2	Friendly	Unknown	
14	17 June 2017	Arthur-Lambert-Stadion, Wittenberg	(Saxony-Anhalt) Lutherstadt Wittenberg	0–2	Friendly		
15	16 June 2018	Sportanlage Rheinwiese, Schaan	(Liechtenstein) FC Azzurri Schaan	1–8	Friendly	Pouti	
16	30 March 2019		(Italy) Atlético Pop United	2–2	Friendly	Unknown	
17	10 June 2019		(Germany) WEINELF	1–1	Friendly	Unknown	
18	15 June 2021	Centro Sportivo Ciriaci, Rome	(Vatican City) Rappresentativa OPBG	2–3	Friendly	Unknown	
19	21 November 2021	Formello Sports Centre, Rome	(Italy) World Roma Federation	7–7	Friendly	Unknown	
20	17 June 2023	Campo Pio XI, Rome	(Germany) KSV Johannisthal	7–1	Friendly		
21	12 October 2024	Käthe Tucholla Stadium, Berlin	(Germany) KSV Johannisthal	2–3	Friendly		

== Final results ==
Up to matches played on 12 October 2024.

Team	Pld	W	D	L	GF	GA	GD	WPCT
Vatican City	31	8	10	13	71	94	−23	25.81
Total	31	8	10	13	71	94	−23	25.81

Source: Results
- Source(s): Sport in Vaticano, Sport in Vaticano, RSSSF, ELO

== Coaches ==
The team has been managed by Giovanni Trapattoni in the past. His first match as manager was played on 23 October 2010 when Vatican City faced a team composed of Italian financial police.

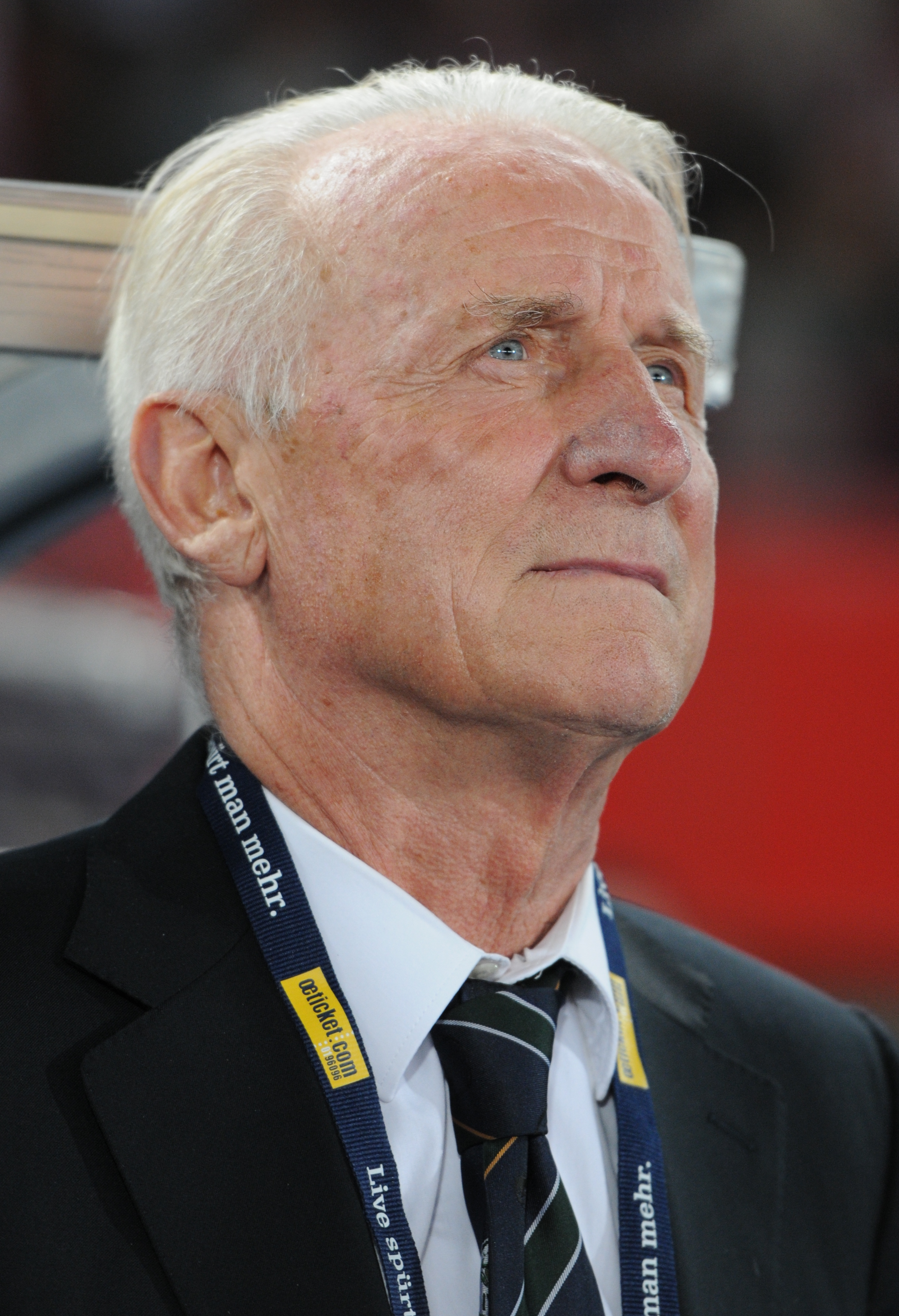
Giovanni Trapattoni coached the team in 2010.

- (Vatican City) Saverio Di Pofi
- (Italy) Giovanni Trapattoni
- (Vatican City) Gianfranco Guadagnoli
- (Vatican City) Massimiliano Strappetti

== Historical kits ==
1990s Home	1998 Home	1998 Away	2000s Home	2000s-2010s	2008 Home	2011 Home

2016 Home	2016 Away	2020 Home	Special Pope; Fratelli Tutti	50 year FA anniversary

== See also ==
- Sport in Vatican City
- Campionato della Città del Vaticano
- List of football clubs in Vatican City
- Index of Vatican City-related articles
