= Vasha =

Vasha may refer to:

- Vaşa, Azerbaijan
- Vasheh, Markazi, Iran
