= Vatican Amateur Sports Association =

National Olympic committee

- Founded: 1972; 54 years ago
- President: Domenico Ruggiero
- Website: Official Website

The Amateur Sports Association (Italian: Associazione Sportiva Dilettantistica "Sport in Vaticano") is an Italian sports association of employees who work in the Vatican City. The Association is headquartered in Italy and has an operative office in the Cortile di San Damaso inside the Vatican. The current President is Domenico Ruggiero.

== History ==
The association was founded in 1972 by Dr. Sergio Valci, a Vatican employee. He remained President of the Association until his death in 2012. Mass has been held for members of the Association at Saint Peter's tomb below St. Peter's Basilica in the Vatican Grottoes.

In May 2023, the association celebrated the conclusion of its fiftieth anniversary with dignitaries, including Cardinal Mauro Gambetti. Among the topics discussed was the possibility of the association joining UEFA. It was revealed that Pope Francis spoke with UEFA President Aleksander Čeferin about the possibility when the latter visited the pope ahead of the UEFA Euro 2020 final.

== Sports ==
The Vatican Amateur Sports Association is currently involved with football, and remains open to other sports.

=== Football ===
Vatican City is one of the eight officially recognized and independent states whose national football team is not a member of FIFA (the others are Monaco, Tuvalu, Kiribati, Federated States of Micronesia, Nauru, Marshall Islands, and Palau). However, Vatican City has fielded a men's national team since as early as 1994 and a women's national team since 2019.

In 2006 UEFA spokesperson William Gaillard told a media outlet that he saw no reason why the Vatican should not have a national team in international competitions. He said, "We already have states of 30,000 citizens like San Marino, Liechtenstein, and Andorra. If the Vatican wants to become a member of UEFA all it has to do is apply. If it meets the requirements, it will be accepted". At that time Cardinal Tarcisio Bertone insisted that the Vatican's football future lies only in amateur games and competitions. In May 2014, Domenico Ruggerio, president of the national football association, stated, "I prefer to be amateur...To join FIFA, at that level, will be like a business" after stating, "The important message of friendship and love is demonstrated by the sport — the real sport, not the business that is in football these days...It is not just important to win a match; it is how you carry yourself." Therefore, that, he added, meant that "the ethos of the Vatican's soccer team was, at odds with FIFA membership.

In addition to the national teams, the Association organizes the Vatican City Championship, Coppa Sergio Valci, and the Vatican Supercoppa.

== See also ==
- Index of Vatican City-related articles
