= Vaso (name) =

Vaso is a name common in Southern and Eastern Europe. The name is normally autonomous name with diminutive the Vasoula and not from the name Vasiliki. Notable people with this name include:

== Given name ==
- Vaso Čubrilović (1897–1990), Bosnian Serb politician
- Vaso Katraki (1914–1988), Greek painter
- Vaso Komnenić (born 1955), Serbian high jumper
- Vaso Laskaraki (born 1979), Greek actress
- Vaso Radić (1923–2011), Bosnian politician
- Vaso Sepashvili (born 1969), Georgian footballer
- Vaso Subotić (born 1969), Serbian water polo player
- Vaso Vasić (born 1990), Serbian footballer

== Surname ==
- Millan Vaso (born 1951), Albanian footballer
- Pirro Vaso (born 1948), Albanian architect

== See also ==
- Vasa (name)
- Vasso
