= 2007 UEFA Champions League final =

Football match in Athens, Greece

- Match programme cover
- Event: 2006–07 UEFA Champions League
Milan	Liverpool
(Italy)	(England)
2	1
- Date: 23 May 2007
- Venue: Olympic Stadium, Athens
- Man of the Match: Filippo Inzaghi (Milan)
- Referee: Herbert Fandel (Germany)
- Attendance: 63,000
- Weather: Partly cloudy 24 °C (75 °F); 46% humidity

The 2007 UEFA Champions League final was the final match of the 2006–07 season of the UEFA Champions League, Europe's primary club football competition. The showpiece event was contested between Liverpool of England and Milan of Italy at the Olympic Stadium in Athens, Greece, on 23 May 2007. Liverpool, who had won the competition five times, were appearing in their seventh final. Milan, who had won the competition six times, were appearing in their eleventh final.

The final was a rematch of the 2005 final which Liverpool won 3–2 in a penalty shootout, after recovering from a three-goal deficit at half-time to level the score at 3–3 after full-time and extra time. Both teams had to pass through five rounds before they reached the final. They both entered in the third qualifying round and won their respective groups before they reached the knockout stage, where matches were contested over two legs, with a match at each team's home ground. Milan's victories varied from close affairs to comfortable victories. They defeated Celtic by a single goal over two legs, while they beat Manchester United 5–3 on aggregate in the semi-final. Liverpool's matches were mainly all close affairs; they beat defending champions Barcelona on the away goals rule in the first knockout round and beat Chelsea in a penalty shootout in the semi-finals, although they did record a 4–0 aggregate win over PSV Eindhoven in the quarter-finals.

Before the match there were ticketing problems because many fans gained entry to the stadium without valid tickets. After the match, a UEFA spokesman accused Liverpool of having the worst fans in Europe, a claim later denied by UEFA president Michel Platini. Watched by a crowd of 63,000, Milan took the lead when Andrea Pirlo's free-kick deflected off Filippo Inzaghi in the first half. Milan extended their lead in the second half when Inzaghi scored a second goal. Liverpool scored a late goal through Dirk Kuyt, but were unable to equalise before the end of the match. Milan won the match 2–1 to win their seventh Champions League.

== Background ==
The match was Milan's eleventh appearance in the final, and the third since 2003. They had won on six occasions (1963, 1969, 1989, 1990, 1994, 2003), and lost four times (1958, 1993, 1995, 2005). Liverpool were appearing in their seventh final. They had previously won the competition five times (1977, 1978, 1981, 1984, 2005), while they lost the 1985 final to Juventus.

== Venue ==
The Olympic Stadium in Athens, Greece was selected as the venue for the 2007 UEFA Champions League final at the April 2005 meeting of the UEFA Executive Committee in Tallinn, Estonia. The meeting also determined the venues for the 2006 final and the 2006 and 2007 UEFA Cup finals. Shortly before the final, the UEFA Champions League trophy was returned to UEFA by Ludovic Giuly, representing the 2006 winners, Barcelona. UEFA president Michel Platini then presented the trophy to the Mayor of Athens, Nikitas Kaklamanis, so that it might be put on display in and around the city. The stadium had hosted the showpiece event before. The most recent was the 1994 final. Coincidentally Milan were the winners, beating Barcelona 4–0. The other final held at the ground was in 1983, when Hamburger SV beat Juventus 1–0. The ground had also played host to the UEFA Cup Winners' Cup final in 1987, when Ajax beat Lokomotiv Leipzig 1–0.

== Route to the final ==
(Italy) Milan				Round	(England) Liverpool			
Opponent	Agg.	1st leg	2nd leg	Qualifying phase	Opponent	Agg.	1st leg	2nd leg
(Serbia) Red Star Belgrade	3–1	1–0 (H)	2–1 (A)	Third qualifying round	(Israel) Maccabi Haifa	3–2	2–1 (H)	1–1 (A)
Opponent	Result			Group stage	Opponent	Result		
(Greece) AEK Athens	3–0 (H)			Matchday 1	(Netherlands) PSV Eindhoven	0–0 (A)		
(France) Lille	0–0 (A)			Matchday 2	(Turkey) Galatasaray	3–2 (H)		
(Belgium) Anderlecht	1–0 (A)			Matchday 3	(France) Bordeaux	1–0 (A)		
(Belgium) Anderlecht	4–1 (H)			Matchday 4	(France) Bordeaux	3–0 (H)		
(Greece) AEK Athens	0–1 (A)			Matchday 5	(Netherlands) PSV Eindhoven	2–0 (H)		
(France) Lille	0–2 (H)			Matchday 6	(Turkey) Galatasaray	2–3 (A)		
Group H winner: Pos / Team / Pld / Pts; 1 / (Italy) Milan / 6 / 10; 2 / (France) Lille / 6 / 9; 3 / (Greece) AEK Athens / 6 / 8; 4 / (Belgium) Anderlecht / 6 / 4; Source: RSSSF				Final standings	Group C winner: Pos / Team / Pld / Pts; 1 / (England) Liverpool / 6 / 13; 2 / (Netherlands) PSV Eindhoven / 6 / 10; 3 / (France) Bordeaux / 6 / 7; 4 / (Turkey) Galatasaray / 6 / 4; Source: RSSSF			
Opponent	Agg.	1st leg	2nd leg	Knockout stage	Opponent	Agg.	1st leg	2nd leg
(Scotland) Celtic	1–0	0–0 (A)	1–0 (a.e.t.) (H)	First knockout round	(Spain) Barcelona	2–2 (a)	2–1 (A)	0–1 (H)
(Germany) Bayern Munich	4–2	2–2 (H)	2–0 (A)	Quarter-finals	(Netherlands) PSV Eindhoven	4–0	3–0 (A)	1–0 (H)
(England) Manchester United	5–3	2–3 (A)	3–0 (H)	Semi-finals	(England) Chelsea	1–1 (4–1 p)	0–1 (A)	1–0 (H)

=== Milan ===
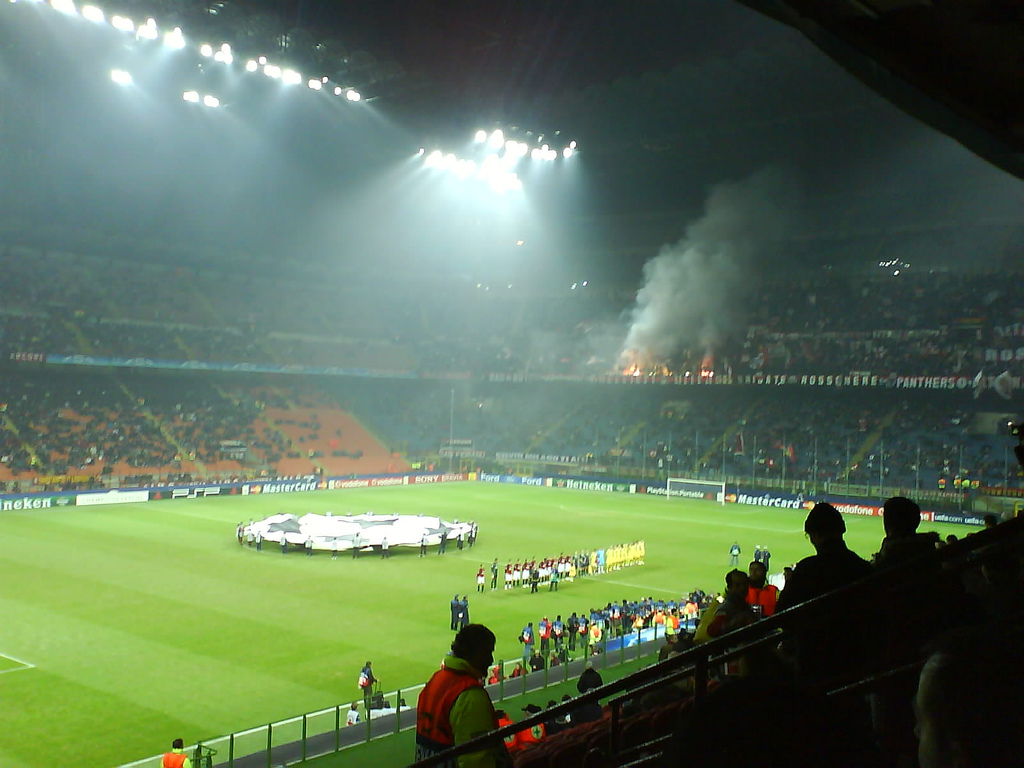
The players of Milan and Lille before their group stage match at the San Siro

Milan qualified for the competition by finishing third in the 2005–06 Serie A. Milan had originally finished second in Serie A, but were docked 30 points for their part in a match-fixing scandal. The original punishment, reduced on appeal, would have barred them from the Champions League altogether. Their opponents in the third qualifying round were Serbian team Red Star Belgrade. Two victories, 1–0 at home and 2–1 away, ensured Milan's passage to the group stage of the Champions League. They were drawn in Group H alongside AEK Athens of Greece, Anderlecht of Belgium and French team Lille. Milan won three matches, drew one and lost two to finish top of the group with 10 points and progress to the knockout stage.

They were drawn against Scottish team Celtic. The first leg at Celtic's home ground Celtic Park finished 0–0. The return leg at Milan's home ground the San Siro also finished 0–0 after 90 minutes with Celtic managing to limit the goalscoring opportunities Milan had. However, three minutes into extra time Milan scored when Kaká curled a shot past Celtic goalkeeper Artur Boruc. Celtic were unable to score the away goal they needed to beat Milan, ensuring the Italians progressed to the quarter finals after a 1–0 aggregate victory.

Milan were drawn against German team Bayern Munich in the quarter-finals. The first leg at the San Siro ended in a 2–2 draw after Bayern had scored an equaliser three minutes into stoppage time. The second leg at Bayern's home ground the Allianz Arena was more comfortable for Milan, as they scored two first half goals to win the match 2–0 and win the tie 4–2 on aggregate. Milan were drawn against English team Manchester United in the semi-finals. The first leg at United's home ground Old Trafford, Kaka scored twice to give Milan a 2–1 lead after Cristiano Ronaldo had scored an early goal. However, two goals from Wayne Rooney in the second half meant United won the first leg 3–2. The second leg at the San Siro saw Milan win 3–0 to progress to the final after a 5–3 aggregate victory.

=== Liverpool ===
Liverpool gained entry to the competition after finishing third in the 2005–06 FA Premier League. As a result of that league position, Liverpool entered the Champions League in the third qualifying round, where their opponents were Maccabi Haifa of Israel. Liverpool won the first leg 2–1 at their home ground Anfield and a 1–1 draw in the away leg in Kyiv (Note: Due to the armed conflict going on in Israel, UEFA decided that no European matches could be staged in the country until further notice. The match was played at Valeriy Lobanovskyi Dynamo Stadium in Kyiv, Ukraine, instead of Maccabi Haifa regular home venue Kiryat Eliezer Stadium in Haifa.) ensured Liverpool progressed to the group stage of the competition. Liverpool were drawn in Group C alongside French team Bordeaux, Dutch team PSV Eindhoven and Galatasaray of Turkey. After six games including four wins, one draw and one defeat, Liverpool finished top of the group with 13 points to qualify for the knockout stage.

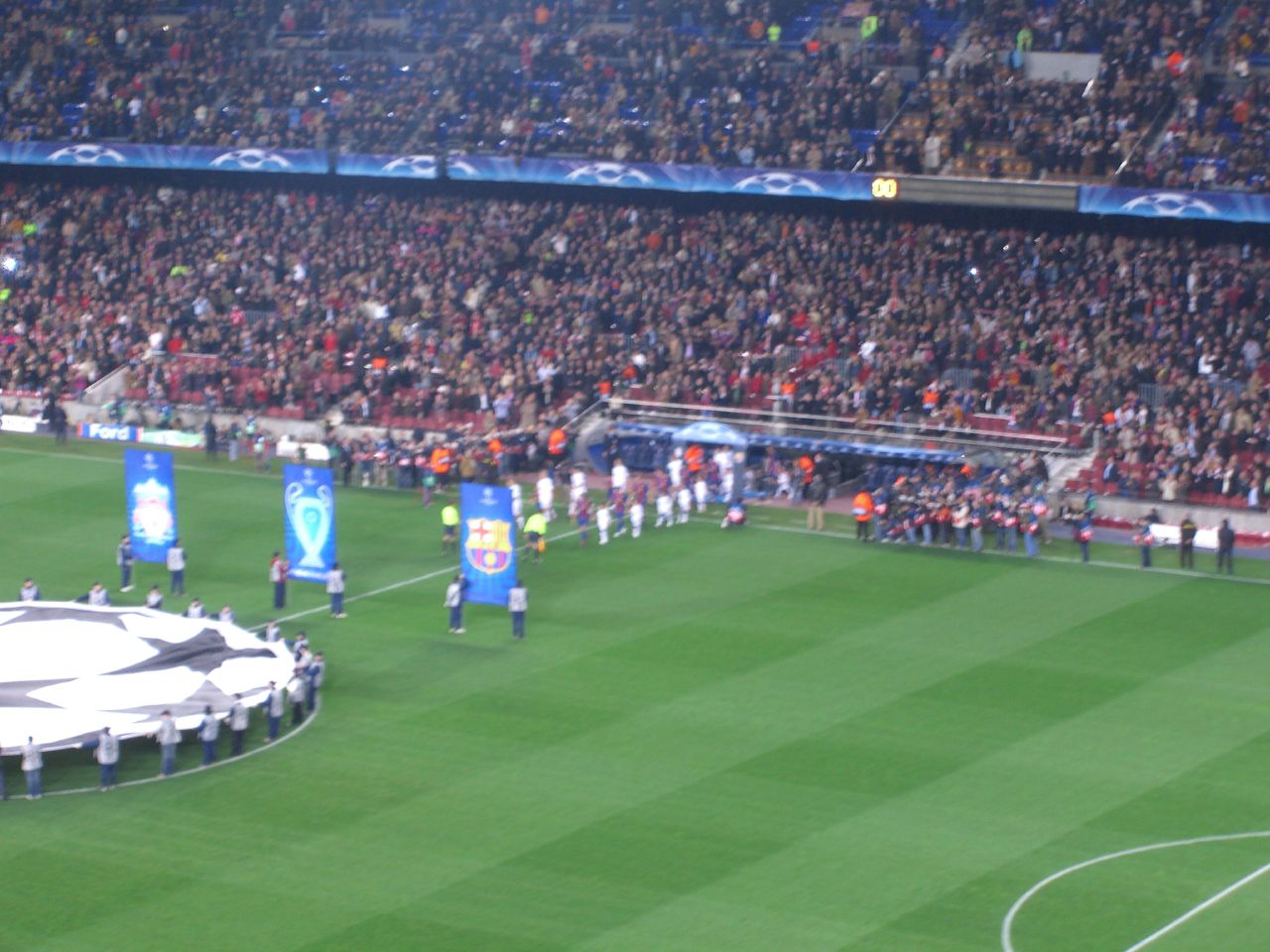
The Liverpool and Barcelona players entering the pitch before their first leg tie at the Camp Nou

Liverpool were drawn against defending champions Barcelona in the first knockout round. Before the first leg in Barcelona, there had been a training ground fracas between Craig Bellamy and John Arne Riise. Coincidentally, it was Bellamy and Riise who secured a 2–1 victory for Liverpool, completing a comeback after Deco had given Barcelona the lead. The second leg at Anfield was won 1–0 by Barcelona, however Liverpool progressed to the quarter-finals on the away goals rule, having scored more goals away from home than their opponents.

Their opponents in the quarter-finals were PSV Eindhoven, who they had played in the group stage. The first leg at PSV's home ground the Philips Stadion was won 3–0 by Liverpool all but securing their progression to the semi-finals. The second leg at Anfield was not as one-sided, a 1–0 victory for Liverpool ensured they would progress to the semi-finals courtesy of a 4–0 aggregate victory. Their opponents in the semi-finals were fellow English team Chelsea. The first leg at Chelsea's home ground Stamford Bridge was a close affair with Chelsea winning 1–0 courtesy of a first half Joe Cole goal. The second leg at Anfield was similar, however it was Liverpool who won 1–0 courtesy to a Daniel Agger goal. With the teams tied at 1–1 aggregate after 90 minutes and extra time the tie went to a penalty shootout, which Liverpool won 4–1 to progress to the final.

=== Broadcasting ===
The match was broadcast live in the United Kingdom on ITV, attracting an average audience of 9.6 million viewers for the full 90 minutes and peaking at 10.3 million. A further 1.2 million viewers watched on Sky Sports. These figures were lower than those for recent previous finals featuring English teams: the 2005 final (Liverpool vs Milan) averaged 10.8 million on ITV, while the 2006 final (Barcelona vs Arsenal) averaged 11.2 million.

== Pre-match ==
=== Match ball ===
Adidas, the official match ball supplier to all major UEFA, FIFA and IOC tournaments, unveiled the official match ball for the 2007 UEFA Champions League final on 9 March 2007, presenting the Adidas Finale Athens. The design of the Adidas Finale Athens was based on the widely recognisable UEFA Champions League Starball logo and was blue and white, representing the colours of the Greek national flag. The final matched two of the top goal-scorers in the competition that season. Milan's Kaká finished on top of the scoring charts with ten goals, and Liverpool's Peter Crouch entered the game tied for third with six goals in total.

=== Kits ===
Despite being drawn as the "home" team for the match, Milan chose to wear their all-white away strip for the final; they consider that strip to be their "lucky kit" (Italian: maglia fortunata), having won the European Cup five times in those colours. However, Milan had also lost two finals wearing all-white, most recently against Liverpool in 2005. This decision by Milan meant that Liverpool played the final in their traditional home kit of red shirts, red shorts and red socks. Each of Liverpool's five European Cup titles were won in their all-red strip, and two of these came when they were playing against Italian teams who played in all-white.

=== Officials ===
In May 2007, Herbert Fandel, the German referee was chosen to oversee the final. He was joined by compatriots Carsten Kadach and Volker Wezel as assistant referees, and Florian Meyer as fourth official.

=== Team selection ===
Milan fielded the oldest starting eleven ever in a Champions League final, with the average age at 31 years, 34 days, while Paolo Maldini was the oldest outfield player ever to play in the final, in what was his eighth final, at 38 years and 331 days. Milan manager Carlo Ancelotti opted to start striker Filippo Inzaghi, who had missed the 2005 final ahead of Hernán Crespo. Liverpool manager Rafael Benítez opted to field a five-man midfield with Jermaine Pennant and Boudewijn Zenden on the wings, while Steven Gerrard was deployed behind lone striker Dirk Kuyt. Liverpool fielded five of the players that started the 2005 final: Xabi Alonso, Jamie Carragher, Steve Finnan, Steven Gerrard and John Arne Riise.

=== Problems before the match ===
Out of 63,800 tickets, only 9,000 tickets for the final went on general sale; the remainder were shared between the two teams, who got 17,000 each, and the UEFA family and sponsors, who received 20,800 tickets. This led to some of the problems before the match. While fans were still queuing to gain entry to the stadium, the Greek police informed them that the stadium was full and denied entry to a number of fans who had genuine tickets. UEFA sources said that as many as 5,000 fans either without tickets or brandishing fakes had entered the 74,000-capacity Olympic Stadium. Simultaneously, thousands of fans with genuine tickets were refused entry as police closed the entrance to the ground amid fears that allowing any more to enter could have led to a disaster. The resulting situation became disorderly, with some Liverpool fans attempting to break through checkpoints, set up by the Greek police. Greek riot police used tear gas and batons to disperse the crowd. UEFA spokesman William Gaillard blamed Liverpool fans for causing the problems, stating, "Milan supporters didn't face the same problems because they didn't behave in the same way".

A UEFA report released soon after the final branded Liverpool supporters "the worst fans in Europe", with Gaillard stating: "What other set of fans steal tickets from their fellow supporters or out of the hands of children?" However, UEFA President Michel Platini later denied that Liverpool fans were the worst behaved in Europe. UEFA was itself criticised for poor ticket-checking procedures and for implementing insufficient measures to deal with the large number of fans. Simon Gass, the British ambassador to Greece, said, "Clearly there was some element of breakdown where those fake tickets appeared to be legitimate – that's something UEFA must look at." Meanwhile, Liverpool co-owner Tom Hicks described UEFA's allocation of 17,000 tickets to each team, knowing that Liverpool would be bringing 40,000 supporters, as "insane" and accused Gaillard of blaming Liverpool fans in order to cover up for his own mistakes. UEFA was further criticised by Milan and Liverpool for their lack of provision for the clubs' disabled fans, providing the clubs with only sixteen disabled tickets each.

== Match ==
=== Summary ===
==== First half ====
Milan won the toss and Liverpool kicked off. Playing in a 4–2–3–1 formation, Liverpool had the first attack of the match, but Jermaine Pennant could not reach Steven Gerrard's cross-field pass. Milan responded with two low attempts on the Liverpool goal, but Jamie Carragher was able to clear them both. The second clearance led to a corner, from which Milan failed to score. Liverpool had the first chance of the match in the ninth minute. A slip from Milan defender Marek Jankulovski allowed Pennant to run into space; he passed the ball to Dirk Kuyt who passed it back to him. Pennant's subsequent shot was saved by Milan goalkeeper Dida. Minutes later Gerrard won a header which found Pennant, however Gerrard was unable to make decent contact with the ball following Pennant's pass. Milan had their first shot of the match a few minutes later. Kaká received the ball outside the area and moved to his right before shooting, however Liverpool goalkeeper Pepe Reina saved the shot. Liverpool continued to exert pressure leading Milan defender Massimo Oddo to mis-read a cross from Pennant, the ball reached Gerrard whose shot went over the goal.

Liverpool had another chance in the 27th minute. Frantic defending from Milan to deny the Liverpool forwards a scoring opportunity, led to the ball being passed to Xabi Alonso, whose shot went wide of the Milan goal. A mistake from Jankulovski allowed Gerrard to pass the ball to Kuyt in the penalty area, however Kuyt's shot was blocked by Milan defender Alessandro Nesta. Milan midfielder Gennaro Gattuso was the first player to receive a yellow card, when he was cautioned in the 40th minute for a foul on Alonso. Minutes later, Alonso fouled Kaká on the edge of the Liverpool penalty area, giving away a free-kick. The subsequent free-kick taken by Andrea Pirlo deflected off the shoulder of Milan striker Filippo Inzaghi, and into the Liverpool goal. The deflection resulted in the ball being diverted past Liverpool goalkeeper Pepe Reina, who had dived the other way in anticipation of the ball's original trajectory. Replays showed that the ball struck Inzaghi's upper arm on its way to the goal, but the referee did not judge this to have been a handball. Inzaghi later said that while the deflection was intended, he did not intend for the ball to hit his arm. With no further action in the first half, Milan went into half-time leading 1–0.

==== Second half ====
Milan kicked off the second half. Two minutes into the half, Liverpool had the first attack, but Nesta tackled Gerrard before he could reach Kuyt's pass. Jankulovski received a yellow card in the 54th minute when he brought Pennant down. Immediately afterwards, Milan had an attack. Pirlo received the ball from a header by Clarence Seedorf, Pirlo played a high pass to Kaká who was ruled to be offside by the assistant referee, despite being behind the defence when the ball was played. Milan had another attack straight after the offside, but Liverpool defender Daniel Agger tackled Inzaghi before he could shoot. Liverpool had their first yellow card in the 59th minute when Javier Mascherano received one for bringing down Pirlo. After the yellow card, Liverpool decided to replace Boudewijn Zenden with Harry Kewell. Liverpool's best goalscoring chance of the match occurred minutes later. Gerrard capitalised on an error by Gattuso to be one-on-one with Dida, but his shot did not possess enough power to beat the Milan goalkeeper.

Liverpool began to exert more pressure, although all their play was in front of the Milan penalty area, while Milan were unable to keep possession of the ball. In an attempt to bring about an equalising goal, Liverpool manager Rafael Benítez substituted Mascherano for striker Peter Crouch. Milan had an attack minutes later, but Inzaghi was unable to control the ball. Inzaghi made amends minutes later when he scored Milan's second goal. With Mascherano substituted, Kaká had the space to pick out a pass to Inzaghi, who took the ball to the side of the Liverpool goalkeeper Reina and rolled it into the net to make the score 2–0 to Milan. Liverpool managed to pull one goal back in the 88th minute when Kuyt scored with a header after Agger had flicked on Pennant's corner from the left. However, they were unable to find a second goal and the referee blew for full-time with the score 2–1 to Milan.

=== Details ===
23 May 2007
21:45 UTC+3

Milan (Italy)	2–1	(England) Liverpool
Inzaghi 45', 82'	Report	Kuyt 89'

Olympic Stadium, Athens
Attendance: 63,000
Referee: Herbert Fandel (Germany)

Milan	Liverpool

GK	1	(Brazil) Dida
RB	44	(Italy) Massimo Oddo
CB	13	(Italy) Alessandro Nesta
CB	3	(Italy) Paolo Maldini (c)
LB	18	(Czech Republic) Marek Jankulovski	(yellow card) 54'	(substituted off) 80'
RM	8	(Italy) Gennaro Gattuso	(yellow card) 40'
CM	21	(Italy) Andrea Pirlo
CM	23	(Italy) Massimo Ambrosini
LM	10	(Netherlands) Clarence Seedorf		(substituted off) 90+2'
SS	22	(Brazil) Kaká
CF	9	(Italy) Filippo Inzaghi		(substituted off) 88'
Substitutes:
GK	16	(Australia) Zeljko Kalac
DF	2	(Brazil) Cafu
DF	4	(Georgia (country)) Kakha Kaladze		(substituted on) 80'
DF	19	(Italy) Giuseppe Favalli		(substituted on) 90+2'
DF	27	(Brazil) Serginho
MF	32	(Italy) Cristian Brocchi
FW	11	(Italy) Alberto Gilardino		(substituted on) 88'
Manager:
(Italy) Carlo Ancelotti

GK	25	(Spain) Pepe Reina
RB	3	(Republic of Ireland) Steve Finnan		(substituted off) 88'
CB	23	(England) Jamie Carragher	(yellow card) 60'
CB	5	(Denmark) Daniel Agger
LB	6	(Norway) John Arne Riise
DM	14	(Spain) Xabi Alonso
DM	20	(Argentina) Javier Mascherano	(yellow card) 58'	(substituted off) 78'
RM	16	(England) Jermaine Pennant
LM	32	(Netherlands) Boudewijn Zenden		(substituted off) 59'
AM	8	(England) Steven Gerrard (c)
CF	18	(Netherlands) Dirk Kuyt
Substitutes:
GK	1	(Poland) Jerzy Dudek
DF	2	(Spain) Álvaro Arbeloa		(substituted on) 88'
DF	4	(Finland) Sami Hyypiä
MF	11	(Chile) Mark González
FW	7	(Australia) Harry Kewell		(substituted on) 59'
FW	15	(England) Peter Crouch		(substituted on) 78'
FW	17	(Wales) Craig Bellamy
Manager:
(Spain) Rafael Benítez

Man of the Match:
Filippo Inzaghi (Milan)

Assistant referees:
Carsten Kadach (Germany)
Volker Wezel (Germany)
Fourth official:
Florian Meyer (Germany)

Match rules

- 90 minutes
- 30 minutes of extra time if necessary
- Penalty shoot-out if scores still level
- Seven named substitutes
- Maximum of three substitutions

=== Statistics ===
First half
Statistic	Milan	Liverpool
Goals scored	1	0
Total shots	2	5
Shots on target	2	1
Saves	1	1
Ball possession	58%	42%
Corner kicks	1	1
Fouls committed	7	16
Offsides	1	2
Yellow cards	1	0
Red cards	0	0

Second half
Statistic	Milan	Liverpool
Goals scored	1	1
Total shots	3	7
Shots on target	1	3
Saves	2	0
Ball possession	48%	52%
Corner kicks	3	5
Fouls committed	8	11
Offsides	2	1
Yellow cards	1	2
Red cards	0	0

Overall
Statistic	Milan	Liverpool
Goals scored	2	1
Total shots	5	12
Shots on target	3	4
Saves	3	1
Ball possession	53%	47%
Corner kicks	4	6
Fouls committed	15	27
Offsides	3	3
Yellow cards	2	2
Red cards	0	0

== Post-match ==
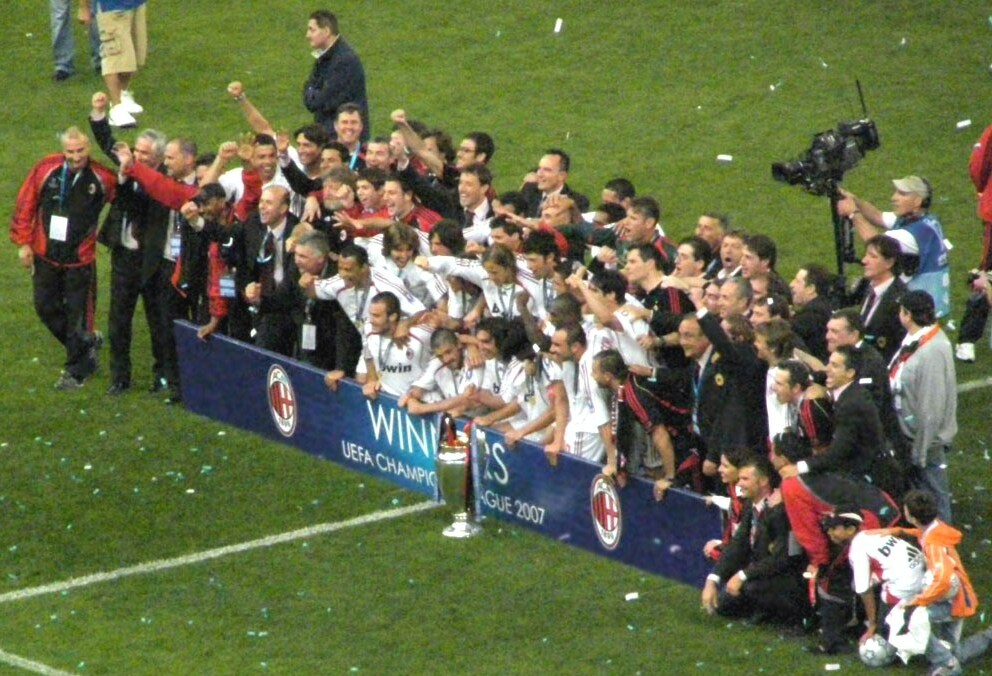
Milan players celebrate with the trophy.

The European Champion Clubs' Cup was presented to Milan captain Paolo Maldini in the Guest of Honour's box, as UEFA President Michel Platini favoured a return to the past tradition of the winning captain receiving the trophy among the fans. It had become customary in recent years to have the presentation on a hastily constructed podium in the centre of the pitch. This was the first time that the trophy was presented to a winning captain by a UEFA president who had actually played against him in the past; during Michel Platini's final seasons with Juventus, the then-teenager Paolo Maldini was making his professional debut with Milan.

Milan manager Carlo Ancelotti was delighted with his team after their success. Ancelotti's job had been under threat after a run of poor results in December, therefore the victory had extra significance for Ancelotti: "When I think back to December, we had to overcome so many hurdles so that makes it a very special victory." Milan midfielder Clarence Seedorf, who had his fourth victory in the competition following Milan's triumph was equally proud in the team's achievement: "I am so proud to be part of this team. We worked hard this year, a very difficult year."

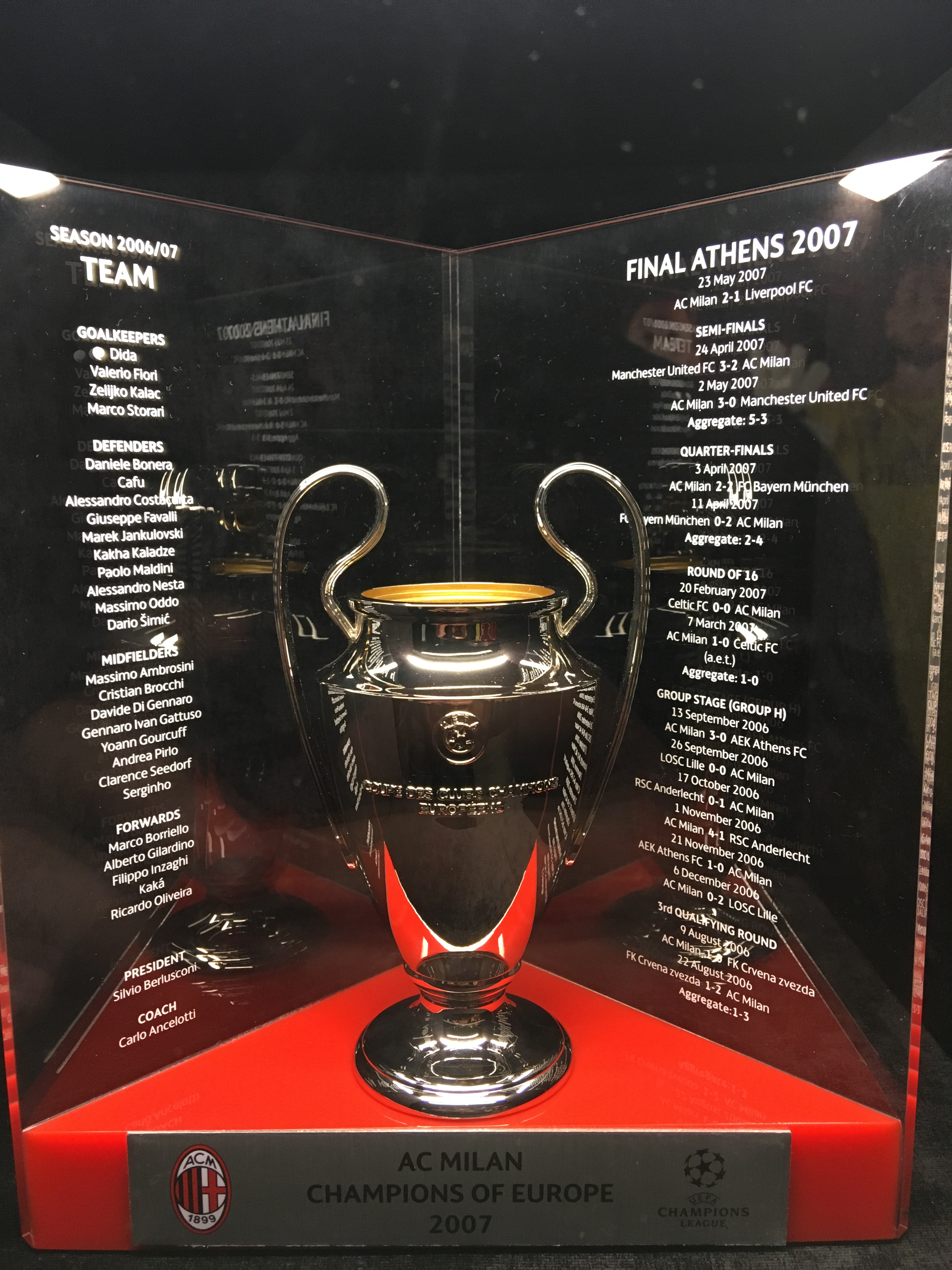
The UEFA Champions League trophy is on display in Casa Milan.

A number of Milan players who had played in the 2005 final were delighted with the victory after they lost two years previous. Kaká claimed victory was all the sweeter as a result: "What happened then was strange, just six minutes when we played not so good and we paid for that." Milan midfielder Gennaro Gattuso echoed his teammates sentiments: "The defeat two years ago will stay me for a lifetime, but this is a different story. It's our turn to celebrate now." Striker Filippo Inzaghi, who missed the final in 2005, was delighted to have scored the goals that won the final for Milan: "I've scored quite a few times in Europe, but scoring in the Champions League final is something special." Milan President and owner Silvio Berlusconi was equally delighted about the success, adding that "the fortune we lacked in Istanbul we had with us tonight."

Liverpool manager Rafael Benítez was disappointed that his team were unable to match their exploits of 2005, when they beat Milan in a penalty shootout. Despite this he was still proud of his players efforts: "Thank you to our supporters, my staff and players who worked really hard and deserved a bit more." Benítez was already thinking of making transfers in the aftermath of the match, hinting that his team lacked the same calibre of players that Milan had: "You could see the quality they had, and we need to start thinking how we can improve our team."

Liverpool captain Steven Gerrard was adamant that despite the defeat Liverpool would come back stronger next season: "We've got to pick ourselves up, have a good rest in the summer and then go again next season." Gerrard thought that although Liverpool controlled the first half, they did not control the match as much in the second half as they would have liked. Gerrard echoed his manager's sentiments in regards to new players joining the club: "We need to strengthen and bring some quality into the club. The manager and the people in charge of the club know that and it will be an interesting summer."

Winning the Champions League entitled Milan to compete in the 2007 UEFA Super Cup against UEFA Cup winners Sevilla. The match was overshadowed by the death of Sevilla player Antonio Puerta, which raised the possibility that the Super Cup might not go ahead. It did however, Milan beat Sevilla 3–1 to secure their fifth Super Cup victory. Milan's success also entitled them to compete in the 2007 FIFA Club World Cup. They entered the competition in the semi-finals, defeating Japanese team Urawa Red Diamonds 1–0 to progress to the final where they faced Argentine team Boca Juniors. Milan won the match 4–2 to secure their first FIFA Club World Cup triumph.

== See also ==
- 2005 UEFA Champions League final – contested by same teams
- 2007 UEFA Cup final
- 2007 UEFA Women's Cup final
- 2006–07 AC Milan season
- 2006–07 Liverpool F.C. season
- AC Milan in international football
- Liverpool F.C. in international football
