= Vaasa (disambiguation) =

Vaasa is a city in Finland.

Vaasa may refer to:

  - Vaasa Airport, located south-east of Vaasa city
  - Vaasa Arena, located in Vaasa city
  - Vaasa University of Applied Sciences, polytechnic university in Vaasa city
  - Vaasa Oy, a former publishing and printing house now owned by Ilkka-Yhtymä Oyj
- Vaasa (electoral district), a constituency represented in the Finnish Eduskunta (parliament)
- Vaasa Province, a province of Finland disbanded in 1997
- Vaasa granite, a garnet-bearing granitoid
- 1507 Vaasa, an asteroid
- Vaasa (Forgotten Realms), a fictional kingdom in Forgotten Realms

== See also ==
- Vasa (disambiguation)
- Vassa
