= Vatican City Championship =

Association football league in the Vatican City

- Founded: 1 May 1972
- Country: Vatican City
- Number of clubs: 8
- Level on pyramid: 1
- Relegation to: None
- Domestic cup(s): Coppa Sergio Valci; Supercoppa
- Current champions: Rappresentativa OPBG (4th title) (2023)
- Most championships: Dirseco (8 titles)
- Website: http://www.sportinvaticano.com

The Vatican City Championship (Italian: Campionato della Città del Vaticano; Latin: Certamen Civitatis Vaticanae) is the top men's association football league of Vatican City. Founded in 1972 as the Coppa Amicizia, teams are composed of workers representing various state departments. Teams are permitted to field an outside player from Italian amateur teams to play as goalkeeper, and players combine to form the Vatican City national team for rare friendly matches. The Vatican football association, Federazione Vaticanese Giuoco Calcio, is not a member of FIFA and is overseen by its president Domenico Ruggiero as of May 2014. All matches are played at the Associazione Sportivo La Salle complex in Western Rome, although the larger Campo Cardinale Francis Joseph Spellman served as home until recently. The league has amateur status with matches and training taking place outside of work hours. Matches take place on Mondays and Tuesdays. Equipment and uniforms are occasionally donated by organizations and benefactors with deficits being covered by the Vatican government. The league takes place between October and May each year with a two-month break in December and January.

== History ==
The first organized football took place in the Vatican in 1947 when a four-team league was staged. The final that year was contested between Pontifical Villas and the Fabbrica di San Pietro. The league was suspended shortly after creation because of fierce competitiveness. Only friendly matches were allowed for the next two decades until another league was reformed in 1966. Seven teams competed during the first season with employees of L’Osservatore Romano, the Vatican newspaper, claiming the first championship. The current league was founded as the Coppa Amicizia, later renamed the Campionato della Citta Vaticano, by Sergio Valci who was former president of the FA and a Vatican healthcare employee until his death in 2012.

A secondary cup known as the Coppa ACDV was created in 1985. It was renamed the Coppa Sergio Valci in 1994. The Vatican Supercoppa began in 2005 and sees the winner of the Campionato della Citta Vaticano face the Coppa ACDV winners.

== Teams in the 2019–20 season ==
Teams
DirTel Team
Fortitudo 2007
Pontificia Università Lateranense
Archivio Segreto
Dirseco
FC Guardia
Musei Vaticani
Rappresentativa OPBG

- Source: Sport in Vaticano

== Champions ==
Season	Champions (number of titles)
Coppa Vaticano
1947	Final abandoned
Coppa Amicizia
1973	Osservatore Romano (1)
1974	Governatorato (1)
1975–1978	Not held
1979	Astor Osservatore Romano (2)
1980	Not held
Campionato della Citta Vaticano
1981	Malepeggio Edilizia (1)
1982	Hercules Biblioteca (1)
1983	SS Hermes (Note: Later renamed Musei Vaticani) (1)
1984	Virtus Vigilanza (Note: Later renamed Gendarmeria) (1)
1985	Teleposte (1)
1986	Teleposte (2)
1987	Tipografia Osservatore Romano (3)

Season	Champions (number of titles)
1988	Servici Tecnici (1)
1989	Associazione S.S. Pietro e Paolo (1)
1990	Dirseco (1)
1991	Dirseco (2)
1992	Associazione S.S. Pietro e Paolo (2)
1993	Dirseco (3)
1994	Dirseco (4)
1995	Dirseco (5)
1996–2000	Not held
2001	Associazione S.S. Pietro e Paolo (3)
2002–2004	Not held
2005	Galacticos Musei Vaticani (2)
2006	AS Cirioni (1)
2007	AS Cirioni (2)
2008	Associazione S.S. Pietro e Paolo (4)
2009	Gendarmeria (2)

Season	Champions (number of titles)
2010	Dirseco (6)
2011	Dirseco (7)
2012	Dirseco (8)
2013	San Pietro Team (1)
2014	San Pietro Team (2)
2015	Musei Vaticani (3)
2016	Musei Vaticani (4)
2017	Santos (1)
2018	Rappresentativa OPBG (1)
2019	Rappresentativa OPBG (2)
2020–2021	Not held
2022	Rappresentativa OPBG (3)
2023	Rappresentativa OPBG (4)
2024	Santos (2)
2025	Archivio Calcio (1)
2026	Archivio Calcio (2)

== Top scorers ==
Season	Team	Scorer	Goals	Ref.
1973–2006	Unknown			
2007	Musei Vaticani	Alessandro Quarta		
2008	Cirioni-Fortitudo	Corrado Rossi		
2009–2010	Unknown			
2011	Dirseco	Armando Goxhaj	15	
2012–2014	Unknown			
2015	Musei Vaticani	Alessandro Quarta	19	
2016	Fortitudo 2007/Pantheon	Flaviano Sperati	20	
2017	DirTel	Armando Goxhaj	22	
2018	Fortitudo 2007	Flaviano Sperati	16	
2019	Dirseco	Santo Morabito	20	

== Notable former players and coaches ==
- (Italy) Gabriele Giordano Caccia - Apostolic Nuncio to Lebanon
- (Italy) / (Brazil) Dino da Costa-former Italian international

== See also ==
- Sport in Vatican City
- Index of Vatican City–related articles

== See also ==
- Vatican City national football team
- Coppa Sergio Valci
- Clericus Cup
