= Vasa, Palghar =

Village in Maharashtra

Vasa
- village
- Location in Maharashtra, India Vasa (India)
- Coordinates: 20.1223442°N 72.8338234°E
- Country: India
- State: Maharashtra
- District: Palghar
- Taluka: Talasari
- Elevation: 65 m (213 ft)

Population (2011)
  - Total: 6,024
- Time zone: UTC+5:30 (IST)
- 2011 census code: 551564

Vasa is a village in the Palghar district of Maharashtra, India. It is located in the Talasari taluka.

== Demographics ==
According to the 2011 census of India, Vasa has 1084 households. The effective literacy rate (the literacy rate excluding children aged six and under) is 57.05%.

Demographics (2011 Census)
	Total	Male	Female
Population	6024	2944	3080
Children aged below 6 years	1058	527	531
Scheduled caste	0	0	0
Scheduled tribe	5999	2936	3063
Literates	2833	1728	1105
Workers (all)	2387	1434	953
Main workers (total)	1564	1026	538
Main workers: Cultivators	419	341	78
Main workers: Agricultural labourers	438	158	280
Main workers: Household industry workers	20	18	2
Main workers: Other	687	509	178
Marginal workers (total)	823	408	415
Marginal workers: Cultivators	155	47	108
Marginal workers: Agricultural labourers	465	237	228
Marginal workers: Household industry workers	6	6	0
Marginal workers: Others	197	118	79
Non-workers	3637	1510	2127
