= Magdalena Wolińska-Riedi =

Polish-Vatican journalist and television presenter

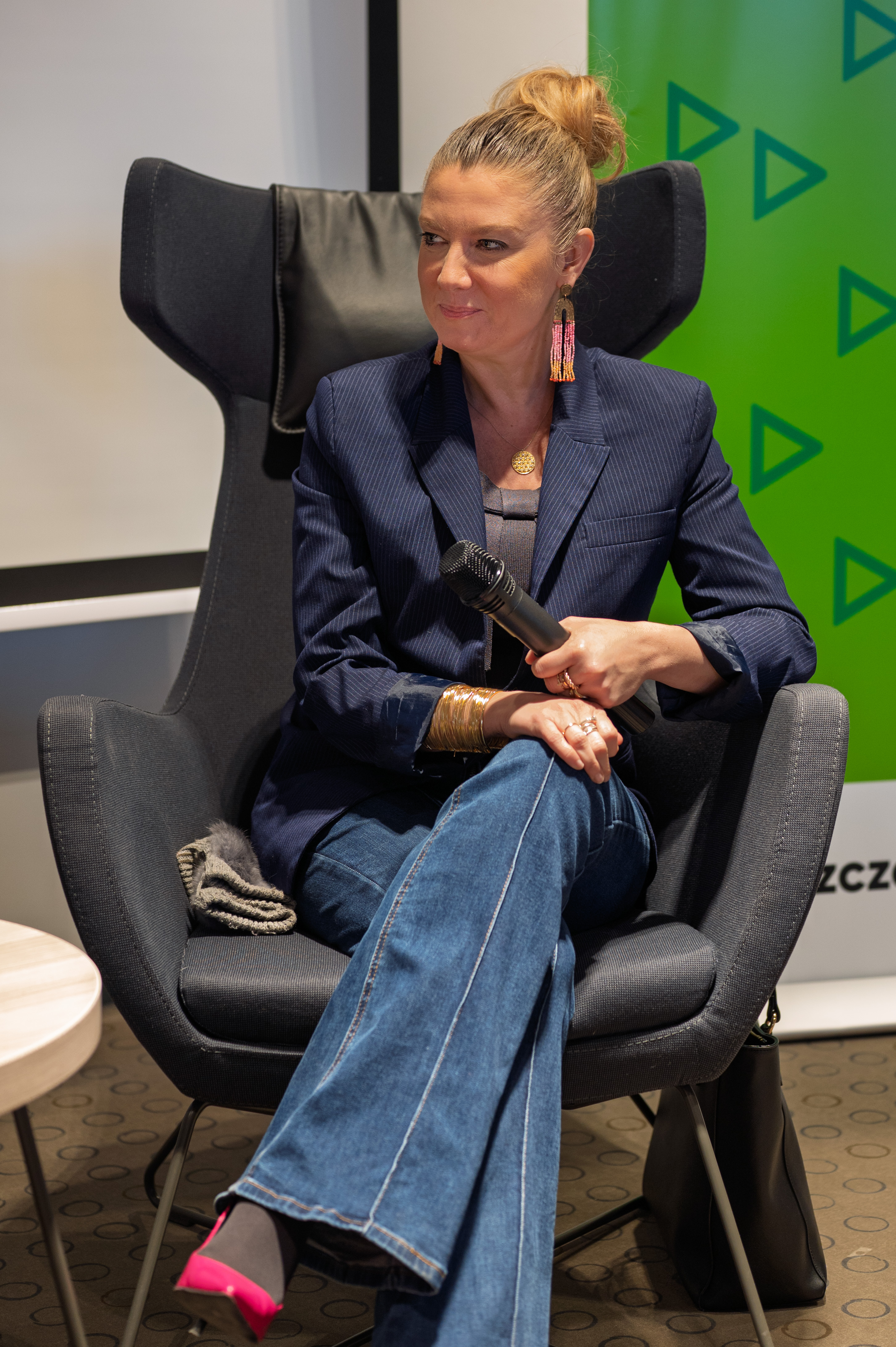
- Wolińska-Riedi in 2026
- Born: 1979 (age 46–47); Warsaw, Poland
- Occupations: Journalist, author

Magdalena Wolińska-Riedi (born 1979) is a Polish-Vatican journalist, translator and author who reports on the Holy See and Italy. After marrying a member of the Pontifical Swiss Guard, she lived inside Vatican City from 2003, becoming one of the few lay women to hold Vatican citizenship, and worked as a translator for the Vatican's tribunals.

Her role as a co-presenter of a 2014 TVP1 documentary series about Poles in Rome and the Vatican was followed by her becoming the Rome and Vatican correspondent of the public broadcaster Telewizja Polska (TVP) the following year; she covered papal journeys, the Mediterranean migration crisis and natural disasters in Italy. In January 2023, TVP suspended her after social-media posts in which she questioned blaming all Russians for the invasion of Ukraine and said that Poles had "suckled hatred with their mother's milk". She apologised for the posts and subsequently continued contributing reports to TVP, the last of which was broadcast in April 2024. In May 2024 she joined the Catholic broadcaster EWTN as a Rome-based reporter.

Wolińska-Riedi has written five non-fiction books published by Znak, the first of which was Kobieta w Watykanie (2019; A Woman in the Vatican), an account of everyday life inside the Vatican. Her later books covered topics including Vatican employees, papal travel, Rome and Roman cooking. She received the Pro Patria Medal in 2022 and the Master of Polish Speech Vox Populi title in 2026.

== Early life and education ==
Magdalena Wolińska-Riedi was born in Warsaw in 1979. She earned a master's degree from the Department of Italian Studies at the University of Warsaw, undertook doctoral studies in the Faculty of Church History at the Pontifical Gregorian University in Rome, and completed the Diplomatic Academy of the Polish Institute of International Affairs in Warsaw.

She travelled to Rome for World Youth Day in 2000, where she met her future husband, a member of the Swiss Guard. She moved into Vatican City as his wife in 2003 and, through the marriage, became one of the few lay women to hold Vatican citizenship; according to a 2013 report by Gazeta Wyborcza, about 30 women held it.

== Career ==
=== Translation and documentary work ===
Living in the Vatican, Wolińska-Riedi worked as a translator between Polish and Italian and between Polish and Latin, mainly for the Holy See's courts, the Roman Rota and the Apostolic Signatura. For more than ten years, she was the only lay woman working as a translator for the Vatican's highest courts. She also translated books into Polish, including Świadectwo, the memoir of Stanisław Dziwisz, longtime secretary to Pope John Paul II, written with Gian Franco Svidercoschi.

By her own account, Wolińska-Riedi has made or co-produced more than twenty documentary films and series about the Vatican and the papacy, including the series Tajemnice Watykanu (Secrets of the Vatican).

=== Telewizja Polska ===
In March 2014 she co-presented the TVP1 documentary series Polacy w Rzymie i Watykanie (Poles in Rome and the Vatican) with the actor Piotr Adamczyk. In September that year, Telewizja Polska's (TVP's) news agency decided not to renew the contract of its Rome correspondent Urszula Rzepczak. Wolińska-Riedi, who had come to the attention of the broadcaster's management through the documentary series, was announced as a replacement for Rzepczak, with effect from when the latter's contract expired in December. She took up the post in 2015.

As a correspondent, Wolińska-Riedi covered Italy and the wider Mediterranean as well as the Vatican. Her reports for TVP dealt with news from the Vatican, the life of the popes and the Church, and patriotic commemorations; Wirtualna Polska described her as best known for covering the Vatican across three pontificates. Beyond the Vatican, she reported on the aftermath of earthquakes in Italy and about refugees crossing the Mediterranean, whom she also helped as they arrived, and reported from aboard an American aircraft carrier, where, according to Twój Styl, civilian women journalists are rarely allowed.

She regularly travelled with Pope Francis on his foreign journeys as part of the papal press corps. During the pope's visit to Poland for World Youth Day 2016, she presented him on the outbound flight with a highlander hat on behalf of President Andrzej Duda, at the request of the presidential chancellery; the diplomacy specialist Janusz Sibora criticised the gesture as a breach of protocol, arguing that a gift from the head of state should be presented by a senior official rather than a journalist. On the return flight she asked the first question at the pope's in-flight press conference, asking for his impressions of Poland; Francis replied by praising the enthusiasm and goodness of the Poles he had met. RMF24 interviewed her after the death of Pope Francis in April 2025, when she recalled her first meeting with him as his neighbour in the Vatican.

=== 2023 suspension ===
On 27 January 2023 Wolińska-Riedi Tweeted a photograph of her daughter at site of the Auschwitz concentration camp, writing that young people needed to learn about "the depths of hell that the Nazis prepared for the world". Some replies criticised her for writing "Nazis" rather than "Germans". In further posts she argued that the totality of the German people were not responsible for the Holocaust, asked whether all Russians or only Vladimir Putin and his circle were responsible for the war in Ukraine, and wrote that perhaps only Poles, who had "suckled hatred with their mother's milk", could interpret the war in that way. A few hours later she apologised, writing that she had been carried away by the discussion and had herself fallen into unfair generalisation and stigmatisation.

TVP announced a day later that it had suspended her from her work. In a statement, the broadcaster said it was outraged by a tweet in which she had called Poles Russophobes and Germanophobes, that there was no place at TVP for statements that undermined Poland's national interest, and that it did not agree with statements echoing Russian propaganda. Wirtualne Media reported in April 2023 that Anna Ołdakowska-Somaini was covering Rome for TVP on a temporary basis and that the broadcaster's ethics commission had not been asked to examine the case. Rzepczak later returned as TVP's Rome correspondent. In an August 2023 interview with Onet, Wolińska-Riedi said that she remained employed by TVP but had been reassigned from news reporting to longer reports and other contributions. She subsequently contributed reports to TVP, the last of which was broadcast in early April 2024.

=== Move to EWTN ===
In May 2024 Wolińska-Riedi joined the Catholic EWTN network as a reporter based in Rome. She announced that she would have regular airtime on the Polish service covering papal journeys, the Vatican, Rome and the Polish diaspora, and would also prepare material for EWTN's American channel. She worked as a journalist and producer on EWTN's John Paul II: Twenty Years Later, which received second place in the feature-video category for radio, television stations and film companies at the 2026 Catholic Media Awards. As of September 2026, she worked as a correspondent in the EWTN News Vatican bureau.

== Books ==
Wolińska-Riedi's first book, Kobieta w Watykanie. Jak żyje się w najmniejszym państwie świata (2019; A Woman in the Vatican: Living in the Smallest Country in the World), was published by Znak and launched at the Media Centre of the Catholic Information Agency in Warsaw in September. Drawing on her years as a resident, it includes anecdotes about the popes, explanations of how the Vatican state was created and who can become a Vatican citizen, how the state differs from the Holy See, and how its everyday services function.

It was followed by Zdarzyło się w Watykanie (2020; It Happened in the Vatican), which has interviews with lay Vatican employees, and Z Watykanu w świat (2021; From the Vatican into the World), about papal journeys; she has described the three books as a Vatican trilogy.

After moving out of the Vatican, she wrote Mój Rzym (2023; My Rome), a guide to lesser-known parts of the city, and Rzym od kuchni (2024; Rome from the Kitchen), about Roman cuisine and its history. Reviewing Rzym od kuchni for the librarians' journal Koszykowa dla Bibliotekarza, Paweł Jaskulski praised its combination of cookery guidance and reportage and the autobiographical passages.

== Personal life ==
Wolińska-Riedi's marriage was officiated by Cardinal Joseph Ratzinger, later Pope Benedict XVI, who as pope also baptised the couple's two daughters and remained in close contact with the family. The daughters were born locally, and attended a Swiss school. Gość Niedzielny described her as the first female journalist to hold a Vatican passport.

The family later moved out of the Vatican to Rome, settling near St Peter's Square. In an interview with Onet, she described the move as bringing a greater sense of freedom, but contrasted it with the security and administrative convenience of life within Vatican City.

== Awards ==
- Pro Patria Medal (May 2022), awarded by the Office for War Veterans and Victims of Oppression for cultivating the memory of the struggle for Polish independence, at a ceremony marking the 78th anniversary of the Battle of Monte Cassino and the 130th anniversary of the birth of General Władysław Anders.
- Master of Polish Speech Vox Populi (September 2026), voted for by the public, from the Master of Polish Speech programme, an initiative to promote the Polish language. The award was presented at the programme's 26th gala in Ostrowiec Świętokrzyski.
