= Stadio Pio XII =

Coordinates: 41°43′52.5″N 12°39′5.7″E

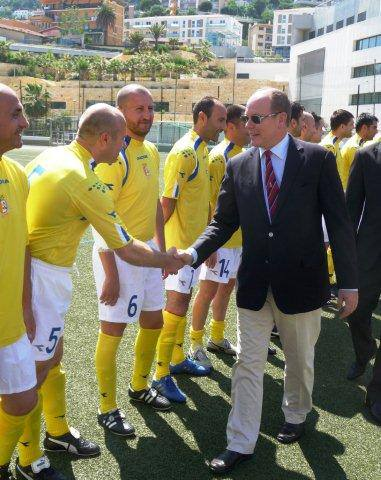
Prince Albert of Monaco with Vatican football players

Stadio Pio XII is a multi-use stadium in Albano Laziale, Italy. It is currently used mostly for football matches, and it serves as the home of Albalonga of Serie D and formerly of the Vatican City national football team. The stadium holds 1,316 people.
