= Vasso =

Vasso (Greek: Βασω) is a surname and given name of Greek origin. Notable people with this name include:

- Dino Vasso (born 1987), American American football coach
- Vasso Karantasiou (born 1973), Greek beach volleyball player
- Vasso Kydonaki (born 1993), Greek football player
- Vasso Papandreou (born 1944), Greek politician
