= IK Wasa =

Swedish sports club

Idrottsklubben Wasa is a Swedish sports club established in 1907. The name originates from the street where the majority of the club's first football players had their homes. IK Wasa has been successful in sports disciplines such as gymnastics, skating, bandy, floorball and football.

Jarl Finne has written the book "Wasa idrottssallskap 1907–1937 Wasa gymnastik- och faktklubb 1884–1908" where the different sections are described in detail. The book can be read at the Royal Library in Stockholm.
