= FC Guardia =

Association football club in Vatican City

- Full name: A.S.D Guardia Svizzera Pontificia
- Founded: 1924
- Ground: Campo Cardinale Francis Joseph Spellman; Rome, Italy
- Capacity: 500
- Chairman: Christoph Graf
- Manager: Fabio Bortoluzzi, Antonio Maria
- League: Vatican City Championship
- 2021/22: 8th

FC Guardia is a Vatican football club that currently plays in the Vatican City Championship, the top level of football in Vatican City. The current club president is Christoph Graf and the current managers are Fabio Bortoluzzi and Antonio Maria. The team, like all Vatican clubs, plays its matches at the Campo Cardinale Francis Joseph Spellman in Rome, Italy. Despite being founded in 1924, the team has never won the league championship. The squad consists of members of the Pontifical Swiss Guard.

In October 2017 the team was a guest of German football club FC Bayern Munich, touring their facilities and meeting with its Italian head coach Carlo Ancelotti.
