= Bambino Gesù Hospital =

Children's hospital in Rome, Italy

- Roman Curia

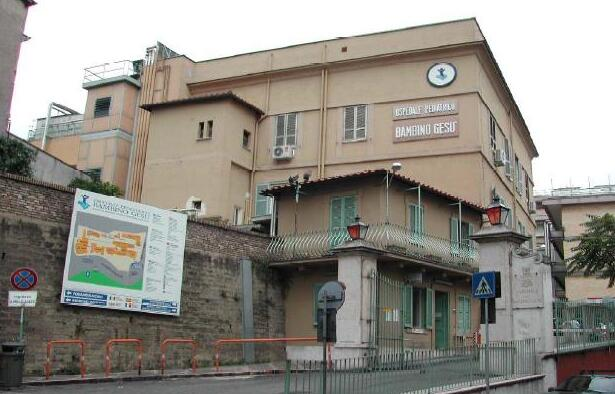
- One of the two entrances to the hospital

Geography
- Location: Rome, Italy, but under extraterritorial jurisdiction of the Holy See
- Coordinates: 41°53′51″N 12°27′39″E

Services
- Emergency department: Yes
- Beds: 607

History
- Founded: 1869; 157 years ago

Links
- Website: ospedalebambinogesu.it

Ospedale Pediatrico Bambino Gesù ('Child Jesus Paediatric Hospital') is a tertiary care academic children's hospital located in Rome that is under the extraterritorial jurisdiction of the Holy See. As a tertiary children referral centre, the hospital provides over 20 specialties of healthcare through 10 pediatric departments.

== History ==
The hospital, which was founded in 1869 by Duchess Arabella Salviati, is based on the model of the Necker–Enfants Malades Hospital in Paris. In 1924, it was donated to the Holy See. In 1985, Bambino Gesù was officially recognized as a research hospital (Istituto di Ricovero e Cura a Carattere Scientifico).

Bambino Gesù is now part of the network of the National Healthcare System in the city of Rome. It is located on an extraterritorial area administered by the Holy See. Since 1980, due to its prestige and to the strengthening of its relations with the Italian National Health System, it has become a significant point of reference for pediatrics at the national level.

The hospital has become known in the last thirty years for its high level of specialization in the treatment of children coming not only from Rome or Italy but also from neighbouring European countries. As a tertiary children referral centre, OPBG offers more than 20 specialties to a 20 million population pool through 10 pediatric departments.

Within the framework of the National Healthcare System, the structure of the hospital has undergone significant revision, following the new organization processes of the Italian Public Administration and public healthcare in particular.

On 4 October 2010, the medical team from Bambino Gesù made the world's first transplant of a permanent artificial heart in a 15-year-old patient.

In 2012, additional hospital buildings were opened near the Basilica of Saint Paul Outside the Walls, again on extraterritorial property of the Holy See.

The Bambino Gesù Hospital (OPBG) is engaged in humanitarian activities to improve provide healthcare in 16 countries in four continents, providing care for over 900 patients and training physicians, nurses and technicians.

== Controversy ==
=== Focus of care ===
In 2017, the Associated Press (AP) reported that a 2014 Vatican investigation had found that the hospital had changed its focus and was "more aimed at profit than on caring for children". The AP reported that overcrowding and poor hygiene contributed to deadly infection, including a 21-month superbug outbreak that killed eight children. It also found that in order to save money, disposable equipment and other materials were used improperly, with one order of cheap needles breaking when injected into tiny veins. The report also stated that doctors were so pressured to maximize operating-room turnover that patients were sometimes brought out of anesthesia too quickly. These alleged incidents were reported to have occurred between 2008 and 2015.

While some of the report's recommendations were implemented, others were not, and the report was not made public. In June 2014, Cardinal Parolin decided to strengthen the Cardinal Secretary of State's authority over the Bambino Gesù. The Vatican later commissioned a second inquiry in 2015 which concluded after a three-day inspection that nothing was amiss.

Hospital administrators responded to the AP story by describing the investigation as a "hoax" and saying that it "contained false, dated and gravely defamatory" accusations and that the hospital had already been cleared by an independent report of the Holy See. After AP published the report, the Holy See released the following statement: "No hospital is perfect, but it is false and unjust to suggest that there are serious threats to the health of children at Bambino Gesù."

=== Investments ===
On 13 July 2017, it was announced that the Tribunal of the Vatican City State had charged the hospital's former president Giuseppe Profiti and former treasurer Massimo Spina with illicitly using money which was destined for the Bambino Gesù Children's Hospital Foundation to renovate the apartment that became the residence of the former secretary of state, Cardinal Tarcisio Bertone. No charges had been filed against Bertone, the Castelli Re construction company or its owner, Gianantonio Bandera, a longtime Bertone associate.

At trial, Profiti testified that hospital funds were used for the apartment renovation with the idea that Cardinal Bertone could host intimate dinners for eight to ten wealthy potential donors at least a half-a-dozen times a year, and defended himself by further testifying that the expense was justified because he intended to use Cardinal Bertone's apartment for fundraisers that would have more than repaid the investment within four to five years. However, no meetings were ever reported to have been held in Bertone's apartment. On 22 September, an official of the Government of the Vatican City State testified that the remodelling project for Bertone's apartment bypassed the normal competitive bidding process and was "singular" and "anomalous". The same day, Spina testified that his immediate superior "told me there were no problems because Cardinal Bertone had clarified the situation with the Holy Father in person".

On 3 October 2017, Gianantonio Bandera, an Italian businessman whose now-bankrupt contracting firm renovated the apartment, testified that Bertone personally oversaw the renovation and contacted him directly without taking bids, as would ordinarily be required.

On 14 October 2017, the three-judge tribunal acquitted Spina and convicted Profiti of a lesser offence of abuse of office. They took into account the defence argument that the money was intended as an investment to benefit the hospital rather than Bertone's apartment. Profiti was also given a one-year jail sentence, less than the three-year sentence the prosecution had sought.

== See also ==
- List of children's hospitals
- Healthcare in Italy
- Rappresentativa OPBG, a football team made up of employees from the hospital
