= William Gaillard =

William Gaillard is the director of communications and public affairs for the Union of European Football Associations (UEFA). He is also the Senior Advisor to the President of UEFA Michel Platini.

Gaillard, who was born in France, came to wide prominence following the condemnation that UEFA suffered in the wake of the 2007 Champions League Final.

== Before UEFA ==
In addition to his career at UEFA, Gaillard has also been Director of Corporate Communication for the International Air Transport Association and the UN International Drug Control Program.

== His role within UEFA ==
William Gaillard is the Senior Adviser to the UEFA President Michel Platini as well as the UEFA's Director of Communication and Public Affairs. He advises the UEFA President on political issues and oversees all external communications

Gaillard heads UEFA's Communications and Public Affairs Division, which is responsible for all activities involving UEFA's relations with the media, as well as for the production of UEFA's various publications and reports and the UEFA charity portfolio.

Gaillard has been highly visible since joining UEFA; indeed, he is perhaps the most prominent of UEFA's senior officials, along with President Michel Platini.

Gaillard has been highly active in anti-racism work within football. Following England's game in 2004 against Spain when players were subjected to racial abuse, he stated that players should not leave the pitch:

We would not condone such behaviour for the very simple reason it could lead to all sorts of abuse," he said. "I don't think we should advise this kind of behaviour for merely technical reasons, because we would have hundreds of cases in which players could walk off the pitch and say 'I heard someone shouting something'. "I don't think this is the right attitude.

— William Gaillard,

Gaillard is an active partner with Britain's Kick It Out campaign and UEFA's own uniteagainstracism

== 2007 Champions League Final ==
Trouble occurred at the 2007 UEFA Champions League Final after thousands of ticketless Liverpool supporters stormed the turnstiles to the stadium; and about two thousand fans who were holding genuine tickets were denied entry as a result. Gaillard said that the problems in Greece were typical of the behaviour of some Liverpool supporters during the past four years, branding them the worst in Europe; despite having previously said that both sets of supporters 'have a tradition of good behaviour'. He accused Liverpool supporters of stealing tickets "out of the hands of children" and said "we know what happened in Athens and Liverpool fans were the cause of most of the trouble there". This was seen by some as UEFA attempting to avoid the blame for the disorganisation of the final, and they were accused by Richard Caborn, the UK Sports Minister, as entering into a blame game. This also resulted in Gaillard being heavily criticised by Liverpool co-owner Tom Hicks.

Caborn met with UEFA president Platini on 5 June 2007, after which Platini replied 'No.' in answer to the question of whether Liverpool's fans behaved more terribly than those in rest of Europe.

== Personal life ==
Gaillard has two sons.

== See also ==
- 2007 UEFA Champions League Final
- UEFA
