= Clericus Cup =

Catholic seminarian football tournament

- Official Clericus Cup Logo
- Founded: 2007
- Region: Vatican City and Italy
- Teams: 16
- Current champions: Collegio Urbano (4th title)
- Most championships: Collegio Urbano (4 titles)
- Website: http://www.clericuscup.it
- 14th season

The Clericus Cup is an annual association football tournament contested by teams from the Roman Colleges, which are seminaries of the Catholic Church located in Rome. During the fourth season (2010), the tournament involved 16 schools and fielded players from 65 countries, with the majority coming from Brazil, Italy, Mexico, and the United States. The players are normally seminarians studying to be Roman Catholic priests. A handful of players are ordained priests. The annual tournament is organized by the Centro Sportivo Italiano (CSI). The league was founded in 2007.

Officially, the goal of the league is to "reinvigorate the tradition of sport in the Christian community" and has been called the "clerical equivalent of soccer's World Cup." In other words, it exists to provide a venue for friendly athletic competition among the thousands of seminarians, representing nearly a hundred countries, who study in Rome. The league is the brainchild of the Cardinal Secretary of State, Tarcisio Bertone, who is a football fan. While some press outlets hinted that the Church hoped to offer a brand of football free of football hooliganism, the reality is that play on the field is intensely competitive.

== The league ==
This competition had its beginnings in 2003 when Jim Mulligan, a seminarian at the Pontifical Beda College, founded a knockout tournament involving eight international teams from the Roman Colleges. This competition was called The Rome Cup. Its first match took place in May 2003 between Beda College and the Venerable English College, which was won 5–2 by the English College. Mulligan became a priest in the Archdiocese of Westminster, London and continues sporting activities, carrying out sponsored abseils and parachute jumps to raise money for various church projects.

The 2009 season drew 16 teams, representing 15 international seminaries, plus the Pontifical Gregorian University. The league is divided into two sides or divisions: Division A and Division B. In 2009, Division A included four national seminaries (The Pontifical North American College, the Brazilian College, the French College, the Polish Institute) and two international colleges (San Paolo and Mater Ecclesiae). The Saint Anselm of the Aventine, and the multinational Gregorian University rounded out Division A.

Division B included the Mexican College, The Pontifical Roman Seminary, the Urbanianum (which fields players primarily from Africa and East Asia), as well as the religious institutes Augustinianum, Sedes Sapientiae, Redemptoris Mater, and Guanelliani Internazionale (The Servants of Charity). Two schools, Almo Collegio Capranica and Pio Latino merged to field the team Almo-Pio.

The first season was played from February to May 2007. The second season began in November of 2007 and finished on 3 May 2008. The regular season games were played at Oratorio San Pietro, on the Via di Santa Maria Mediatrice, 24. The third season was played from February to May 2009 with Redemptoris Mater winning the championship against the Pontifical North American College. The fourth season was played from February to May 2010 with the championship game again consisting of Redemptoris Mater against the Pontifical North American College. Redemptoris Mater won the championship game, 1–0, against the North American College, the same score as in 2009.

During the second season, the inaugural and final match were held at the site of the 1960 Summer Olympics: the Stadio dei Marmi in Rome. In the third season, the opening game was officiated by one of Italy's top referees, Stefano Farina.

The 2020 and 2021 seasons were cancelled due to the COVID-19 pandemic. The 2022 season was scheduled but eventually cancelled as well. There was also no 2023 season.

== News coverage ==
The blue card is used for a 5-minute bench penalty for unsportsmanlike play

Despite the league's amateur status, it has attracted the attention of the professional football community. The president of the Union of European Football Associations (UEFA) called the inauguration of Clericus Cup III (the 2009 season) "evidence of success" of the league. In 2009, the major Italian newspapers covered the league as a novelty – including Corriere della Sera, Il Giornale, Corriere dello Sport, and the anti-clerical La Repubblica. A video featuring a player from the Urbanium's team is available on the web. Voice of America reported on the North American College's road to the championship game in 2009.

In the first two seasons, international newspapers often focused on events peripheral to the game itself. During the Clericus Cup II season, several international newspapers found the hyper-enthusiasm of the fans newsworthy. Redemptoris Mater's club, in particular, generated a very noisy fan base. The Pontifical North American College also employed a megaphone that annoyed both opposing players and neighbors alike. This led the local government to pass an ordinance banning the use of tambourines, percussion instruments, and loud speakers during morning hours – when most of the league's games are played. The media coverage has increased the profile of the league, whose talent continues to improve each year.

The British press has covered the Cup's use of a blue card, which British reporters labelled the sin bin. Instead of the red and yellow cards, the blue card is a 5-minute bench penalty for unsportsmanlike play.

== Championship results ==
Year	Final			Third place match		
Year	Winner	Score	Runner-up	Third place	Score	Fourth place
2007	Redemptoris Mater	1–0	Pontifical Lateran University	Mater Ecclesiae	3–1	Sedes Sapientiae
2008	Mater Ecclesiae	2–1	Redemptoris Mater	UCro	2–1	Pontifical North American College
2009	Redemptoris Mater	1–0	North American College	Mater Ecclesiae	2–0	Collegio Urbano
2010	Redemptoris Mater	1–0	North American College	Brazilian College	6–1	Guanelliani
2011	Pontifical Gregorian University	3–1	Angelicum	Sedes Sapientiae	2–1	Pontifical North American College
2012	North American College	3–0	Pontifical Gregorian University	Sedes Sapientiae	0–0 (4–3, pk)	Mater Ecclesiae
2013	Pontifical North American College	1–0	Mater Ecclesiae	Redemptoris Mater	3–1	Collegio Urbano
2014	Collegio Urbano	1–0	Redemptoris Mater	Theological Institute of St. Peter	2–1	Sedes Sapientiae
2015	Collegio Urbano	2–1	Redemptoris Mater	Pontifical Gregorian University	3–1	Sedes Sapientiae
2016	Mater Ecclesiae	0–0 (4–3, pk)	Collegio Urbano	Pontifical Gregorian University	4–0	Pio Latino
2017	Collegio Urbano	2–0	Pontifical Gregorian University	Mater Ecclesiae	4–3	Redemptoris Mater
2018	Pontifical North American College	0–0 (4–2, pk)	Collegio Urbano	Pontifical Gregorian University	0–0 (3–1, pk)	Sedes Sapientiae
2019	Collegio Urbano	3–0	Sedes Sapientiae	Guanelliani	2–1	Pontifical North American College
2020–2023	Cancelled					

== Teams reaching the top four ==
Team	Titles	Runners-up	Third place	Fourth place
Pontifical Urban University	4 (2014, 2015, 2017, 2019)	2 (2016, 2018)	—	2 (2009, 2013)
Redemptoris Mater	3 (2007, 2009, 2010)	3 (2008, 2014, 2015)	1 (2013)	1 (2017)
Pontifical North American College	3 (2012, 2013, 2018)	2 (2009, 2010)	—	3 (2008, 2011, 2019)
Mater Ecclesiae	2 (2008, 2016)	1 (2013)	3 (2007, 2009, 2017)	1 (2012)
Pontifical Gregorian University	1 (2011)	2 (2012, 2017)	3 (2015, 2016, 2018)	—
Pontifical Lateran University	—	1 (2007)	—	—
Angelicum	—	1 (2011)	—	—
Sedes Sapientiae	—	1 (2019)	2 (2011, 2012)	4 (2007, 2014, 2015, 2018)
Ukrainian College	—	—	1 (2008)	—
Brazilian College	—	—	1 (2010)	—
Theological Institute of St. Peter	—	—	1 (2014)	—
Guanelliani	—	—	1 (2019)	1 (2010)
Latin American College	—	—	—	1 (2016)

== See also ==
- Vatican City national football team
