= Vasa (name) =

Vasa is a masculine given name and nickname (short for Vasilije), as well as a surname. Notable people with the name include:

- Vasa Mihich (born 1933), American artist
- Vasa Mijić (born 1973), Serbian volleyball player
- Vasa Stajić (1878—1947), Serbian writer and philosopher
- Vasilije Vasa Čarapić (1768–1806), Serbian voivode (military commander)
- Vasilije Vasa Jovanović (1874–1970), Serbian lawyer, politician, founder of the Chetnik movement and a founding member of the League of Nations
- Vasilije Vasa Živković (1819–1891), Serbian poet and Orthodox priest
- Vasilije Vasa Pelagić (1833–1899), Bosnian Serb writer, physician, educator, clergyman, nationalist and proponent of utopian socialism
- Vasilije Vaso Čubrilović (Vasilije Vasa Čubrilović; 1897–1990), Bosnian Serb scholar and politician
- Gustav Vasa (1496–1560), King of Sweden
- Eero Vasa (born 1997), Finnish tennis player
- Robert F. Vasa (born 1951), American Roman Catholic prelate and former Bishop of Baker

== See also ==
- Váša Příhoda (1900–1960), Czech violinist
