= Vaşa =

- Municipality
- Location within Azerbaijan
- Coordinates: 40°53′05″N 48°21′19″E
- Country: Azerbaijan
- District: Ismayilli

Population
  - Total: 165
- Time zone: UTC+4 (AZT)

Vaşa (also, Vasha and Vosha) is a village and municipality in the Ismayilli District of Azerbaijan. It has a population of 165.
