= Supercoppa (Vatican City) =

Annual football cup match in Vatican City

- Founded: 2005
- Region: Vatican City
- Current champions: Rappresentativa OPBG (2nd title)
- Most championships: Musei Vaticani (3 titles)

The Suppercoppa is an annual football domestic cup match for teams of Vatican City. The inaugural Suppercoppa was held in 2005. The Supercoppa is contested between the winners of the Vatican City Championship and the winners of the Coppa Sergio Valci.

== Champions ==
Season	Winner	Score	Runners–up
2005	CIE Telematica		
2006	Not known		
2007	Pantheon		AS Cirioni
2008	SS Hermes	1–0	Associazione SS. Pietro e Paolo
2009	SS Hermes		Gendarmeria
2010	DirTel		
2011	Dirseco		
2012	Dirseco	4–1	Gendarmeria
2013	San Pietro Team	2–1	Fortitudo 2007
2014	San Pietro Team	3–1	DirTel
2015	Santos	1–0	Musei Vaticani
2016	Musei Vaticani	2–0	Santos
2017	Santos	2–0	Rappresentativa OPBG
2018	Rappresentativa OPBG	2–1	Musei Vaticani
2022	Rappresentativa OPBG	5–0	Gendarmeria

== Results by team ==
Club	Wins
Musei Vaticano	3
Dirseco	2
San Pietro Team	2
Santos	2
Rappresentativa OPBG	2
CIE Telematica	1
DirTel	1
Pantheon	1
