= Coppa Sergio Valci =

- Organiser(s): (Vatican City) Federazione Vaticanese Giuoco Calcio
- Founded: 1985; 41 years ago
- Region: Vatican City
- Teams: 8
- Domestic cup: Supercoppa
- Current champions: Santos (second title)
- Most championships: Dirseco (eight titles)

The Coppa Sergio Valci is an annual men's domestic round robin association football tournament played in Vatican City. The competition was founded in 1973 and has been played under a variety of different formats throughout its history.

Dirseco are the most successful team in the history of the competition, having won it eight times. Santos are the reigning champions having won the competition for the second time in 2024.

== History ==
Football has been played in the Vatican City since 1751 and the first modern competitions were established in 1947.

The Coppa Sergio Valci was founded in 1973 as the Coppa dell'Amicizia (Italian for 'Friendship Cup') by Dr. Sergio Valci, supported by Cardinal Sergio Guerri, president of the Pontifical Commission for the Vatican City. The inaugural competition began on 2 April 1973 and was contested by seven teams – Governatorato, Hermes/Musei Vaticani, Osservatore Romano, Radio Vaticani, Sampietrini, Tipografia and Vigilanza. The first champions were Osservatore Romano. For the 1981 season, it was renamed as the Campeonato della Citta Vaticano (Italian for 'Vatican City Championship').

Although mostly contested as an 11-a-side competition, the tournament has taken on a number of formats including 5-a-side, 8-a-side and 9-a-side.

In 2012, Dr. Sergio Valci, president of l'Attività Calcistica dei Dipendenti Vaticani (Italian for 'Football Activity of Vatican Employees') died after leading the organisation for more than 40 years. The competition had been renamed after him.

== Winners ==
Coppa Amicizia
1973	Osservatore Romano
1974	Governatorato
1975-78	No competition
1979	Astor Osservatore Romano
1980	no competition
Coppa ACDV
1981	Malepeggio Edilizia
1982	Hercules Biblioteca
1983	SS Hermes (Musei Vaticani)
1984	Virtus Vigilanza
1985	Teleposte
1986	SS Hermes (Note: later renamed Musei Vaticani)
1987	Associazione S.S. Pietro e Paolo
1988	Servizi Tecnici
1989	Teleposte
1990	Teleposte
1991	Servizi Tecnici
1992	Dirseco
1993	Dirseco
Coppa Sergio Valci
1994	Dirseco
1995	Teleposte
1996–2006	Unknown
2007	Pantheon
2008	SS Hermes
2009	SS Hermes
2010	Dirseco
2011	Telefoni SCV
2012	Dirseco
2013	Fortitudo 2007
2014	San Pietro Team
2015	Musei Vaticani
2016	Santos
2017	Rappresentativa OPBG
2018	Musei Vaticani
2019	Dirseco
Coppa Amicizia
2021	Gendarmeria
Coppa Vaticana
2022	Rappresentativa OPBG
2023	Rappresentativa OPBG
2024	Santos
