= Sport in Vatican City =

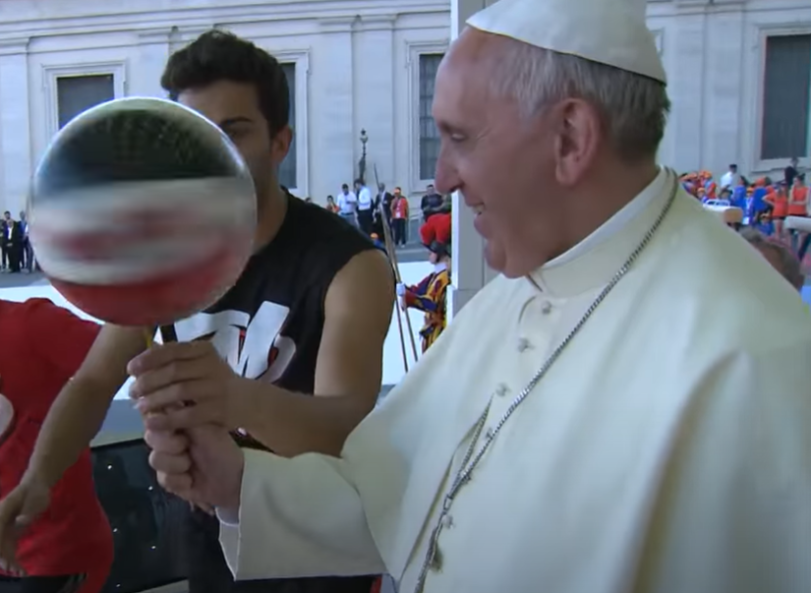
Pope Francis spinning a basketball on a pencil during a sports showcase in the Vatican

Vatican City has national teams that compete in athletics, cricket, cycling, football, padel, and taekwondo. Outside of competitive play, sport has been stated as a way of interfaith dialogue, promoting peace with other nations, diplomacy, and fraternity.

A race track was built in the 1st century where Vatican City is now located. In the 16th century, a game of calcio fiorentino was held in the Cortile del Belvedere. The 20th and 21st centuries saw the expansion of sporting activities in Vatican City, with it being encouraged after World War II by Pope Pius XII. It also saw the establishment of Vatican Athletics, the first official sporting organization of Vatican City. Vatican Athletics also handles Vatican Cycling, Vatican Taekwondo, and Vatican Padel, which are members of their sports' respective international federations.

The first athlete to officially represent Vatican City in international competition was Rien Schuurhuis, who competed in the 2022 and 2023 UCI Road World Championships. In multi-sport events, Vatican City has not competed in the Olympic Games as it does not have a National Olympic Committee. Although, Vatican City has supplied delegations for other multi-sport events, such as the Mediterranean Games and the Games of the Small States of Europe.

== History ==
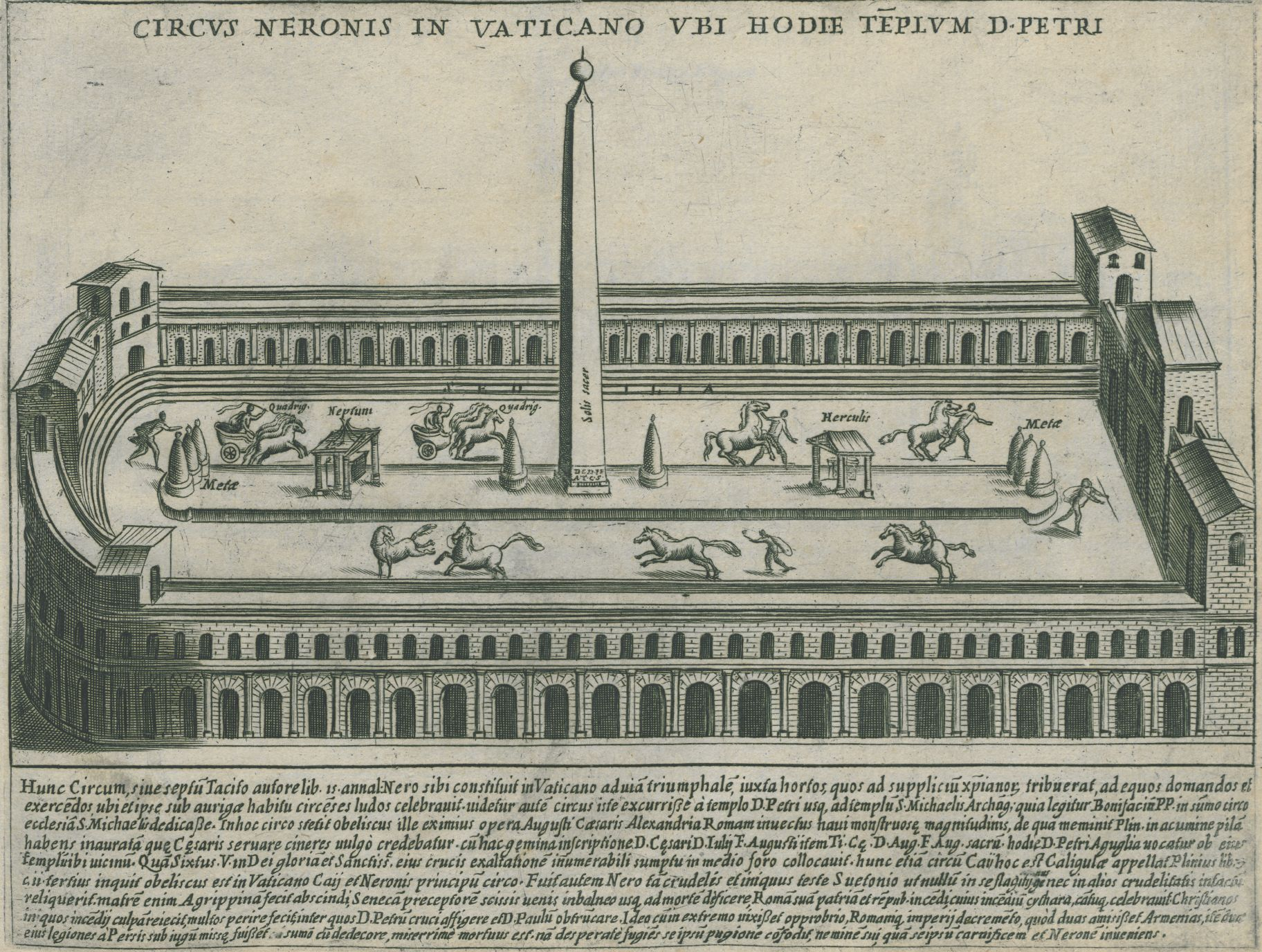
Drawing of the Circus of Nero (Pietro Santi Bartoli, 1699)

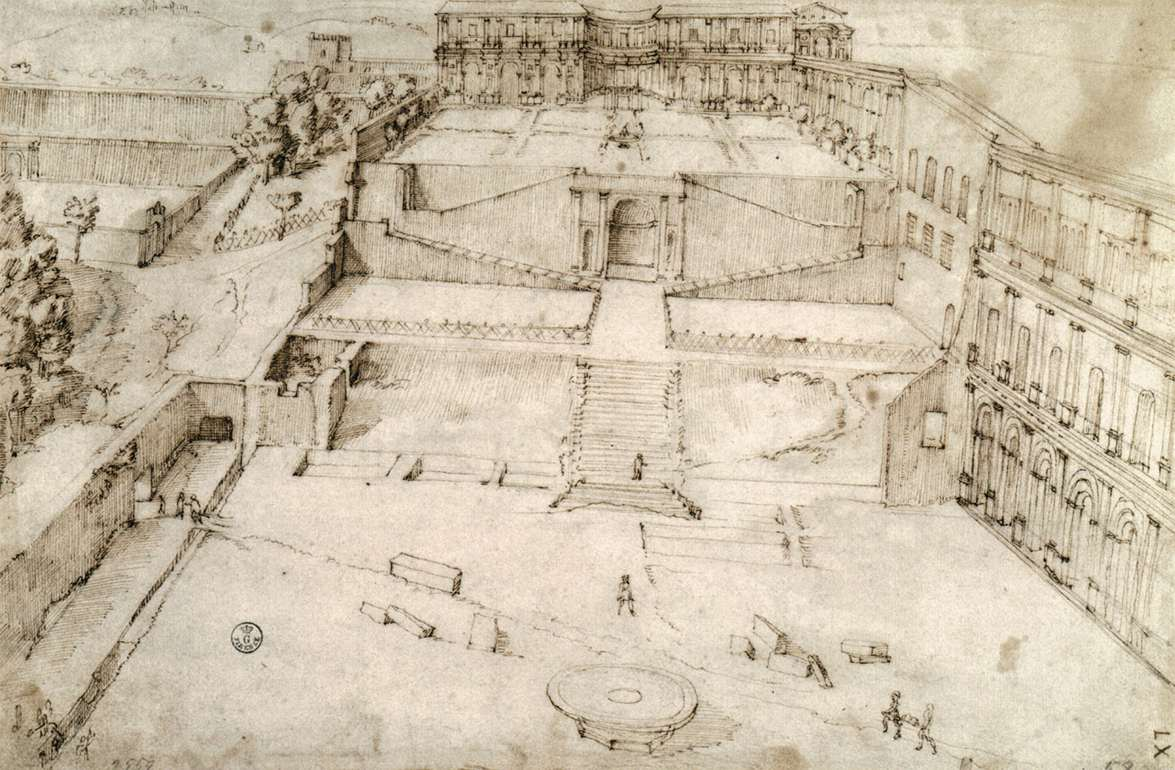
Drawing of the Cortile del Belvedere (Giovanni Antonio Dosio, 1558–1561)

A sporting facility built in what is now Vatican City was the first-century chariot-racing track of the Circus of Nero. Also known as the Circus of Caligula, the track was built in what was then ancient Rome. The circus itself was constructed on Vatican Hill, one of the seven hills of Rome, and was completed in the reign of Emperor Caligula. The circus lasted until between 318 and 322 when Emperor Constantine I ordered construction on the site to be replaced with the Old St. Peter's Basilica.

A game of calcio fiorentino was held in the 16th century within Vatican City. A predecessor to association football and rugby, the game was organized by the Papal States and was held on 7 January 1521, in the Cortile del Belvedere, located in the Apostolic Palace. The first match itself was notably attended and organized by Pope Leo X.

In the aftermath of World War II, Pope Pius XII encouraged sporting activities within Vatican City. Sporting activities were organized and executed by the Catholic Church, through Catholic youth and sports associations.

=== Attitude towards sport ===
Pope John Paul II made multiple speeches and messages that relate to sport and helped with multiple advancements to the spread of sport within Vatican City, such as the establishment of the Church and Sport section in the Pontifical Council for the Laity during his rule. Being known as the "athlete Pope", he also established Office of Church and Sport for the promotion of sport within Vatican City and the Church's connection with sport.

On multiple occasions, Pope Francis, stated that sport could be used as a way of advocating peace across nations, fraternity, and diplomacy. He praised the North Korean and South Korean teams at the 2018 Winter Olympics in Pyeongchang, South Korea, for their joint supply of a unified Korean team at the Games, stating that the Vatican would back up peace initiatives between the two nations. Francis also stated to Vatican Athletics that sport "reminds us that, despite our differences, we are all members of the same human family", stating that sport could promote peaceful relationships with other nations during the lead-up to the 2024 Summer Olympics and 2024 Summer Paralympics in Paris.

Pope Leo XIV is a lifelong fan of American sports, especially Major League Baseball. He supports multiple sport teams associated with his hometown of Chicago such as the Chicago White Sox and the Chicago Bears. Leo XIV has promoted sport as a vehicle for peace and dialogue across nations and as a method of personal improvement. He plays tennis every week on Mondays and Tuesdays and also engages in swimming and horseback riding. In 2025 Leo XIV met with tennis player Jannik Sinner, who gifted the Pope a tennis racket. In 2026 he met with the Italian delegation for the 2025 Special Olympics World Winter Games and reaffirmed his view that sport is a "universal language" that teaches "noble and authentic values". Leo XIV has stated that, as Pope, he takes a neutral position on sports rivalries, but that "Prevost has another opinion", referring to his non-papal name.

== Multi-sport events ==
=== Olympic Games ===
As of July 2024, Vatican City is not a member of the International Olympic Committee and is therefore not able to send a team to the Olympic Games, though it had made bids to compete at the 2024 Summer Olympics in Paris, France. To form a National Olympic Committee, national sport federations must conduct sporting activities within its borders and internationally. It also must be affiliated with at least five international federations that govern sports included in the programme of the Games. As of May 2024, two of its national sport federations have been affiliated with governing bodies of sports, namely Vatican Cycling with the Union Cycliste Internationale and Vatican Taekwondo with World Taekwondo.

"With five or six of these sporting realities, we could form a National Olympic Committee. And be able to parade, one day, at the Olympic Games. We don’t want to fight for medals. Our Olympic Committee would be above all symbolic."

— Melchor Sánchez de Toca Alameda, interview with Inside the Games

Prior to the designation of Paris as the host of the 2024 Summer Olympics, the city of Rome expressed its intent to host the Games in 2014. Due to the Vatican's location within the city, Francis sent support for the events of archery and football to be held within its boundaries, specifically at the Gardens of Vatican City and the Palace of Castel Gandolfo. In September 2016, the city withdrew its bid as the host of the Games, leaving it to the city of Paris.

As part of planning to join the Olympic Games, delegations from Vatican City led by the head of the sports department in the culture ministry, Melchor Sánchez de Toca Alameda, were present at the 2016 Summer Olympics in Rio de Janeiro, Brazil, and 2018 Winter Olympics in South Korea as observers. Francis also met with IOC President Thomas Bach multiple times for talks to let Vatican City take part in the Olympic Games opening ceremonies.

Vatican City (highlighted in blue) alongside members of the Games of the Small States of Europe (in red), with the Faroe Islands (in green) as a prospective member

=== Mediterranean Games ===
The Vatican supplied two athletes to compete symbolically for Vatican City at the 2022 Mediterranean Games, held in Oran, Algeria, in a "non-scoring" manner. The decision was approved by the local organizers of the Games and Davide Tizzano, the president of the International Committee of Mediterranean Games. Runners Sara Carnicelli and Simone Adamoli were part of the delegation to be the first ever participants from Vatican City to compete in a multi-sport event. Eventually, Carnicelli competed in the women's half marathon, unofficially placing ninth with a time of 1:17:21, and became the first ever athlete for Vatican City to compete in a multi-sport event following Adamoli's withdrawal from his event.

=== Games of the Small States of Europe ===
A delegation from Vatican City was present at the 2019 edition of the Games of the Small States of Europe in Budva, Montenegro, but was only allowed to observe as they were barred from competing due to the absence of a National Olympic Committee alongside the Faroe Islands. They were then set to compete at the 2021 Games of the Small States of Europe held in Andorra la Vella, Andorra, through a partnership with the Italian Olympic Committee signed in 2018, but the event was cancelled due to the COVID-19 pandemic and to avoid scheduling conflicts with the 2020 Summer Olympics, which were rescheduled to be held in 2021 in Tokyo, Japan.

== Team sports ==
=== Cricket ===
Vatican City is not a member of the International Cricket Council; however, a representative national men's cricket team was formed in 2013. The St Peter's Cricket Club, also known as the Vatican Cricket team and Vatican XI, was initially the idea of then-Australian ambassador to the Holy See, John McCarthy. The club was tasked with recruiting players from among seminarians and priests at Catholic colleges and seminaries in Rome. For its home matches, the team plays at the Roma Capannelle Cricket Ground. The team's initial squad in 2014 was composed of players from India, Pakistan, Australia, England, Bangladesh, and New Zealand.

The first ever match for the team was against the Roma Capannelle Cricket Club, where the former lost. The team also tours in various locations such as Portugal in 2017, England in 2018, and another tour in England in 2024. For the 2018 tour, the team then played against a team made up of Anglican priests and seminarians of the Church of England, with the main objective of sports diplomacy and interfaith dialogue to improve both relations between the two Christian denominations.

=== Football ===
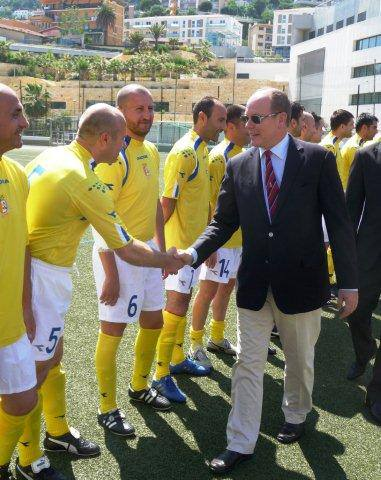
Albert II, Prince of Monaco greeting the men's football team in June 2013

Vatican City is not a member of FIFA; however, representative men's and women's national football teams exist and play friendly matches and in unofficial tournaments. All of the Vatican's football activities are held at Campo Pio XI, a football stadium in Rome. The men's team first unofficial match was against Austrian journalists in 1985 which ended in a score of 3–0 in favor of the former, while the first official match was against San Marino, which ended in a draw. The women's team first match was against AS Roma's youth team, losing to a score of 0–10. The women's team also stirred controversy after one of their matches was abandoned in Simmering, Vienna, on 22 June 2019 as part of the club's twentieth anniversary, after opposing players from FC Mariahilf and bystanders protested about the Catholic Church's stance on abortion and homosexuality during the playing of Vatican City's national anthem.

After World War II, association football was introduced to the country and the sport's first tournament in the country was held in 1947. The first football club in the country was formed in the mid-1960s by employees of the Vatican Museums, and a local football league, the Vatican City Championship, was founded in 1972 and is made up of teams representing employees of the different administrative departments in the Vatican. The league went through many name changes, first being called the Coppa Vaticano at its inception, then being renamed the Coppa Amiciza in 1947, and the Campionato della Citta Vaticano in 1981, by Sergio Valci who was the former president of the Health Insurance Fund (Fondo Assistenza Sanitaria; FAS) and a Vatican healthcare employee until his death in 2012.

Other tournaments include the secondary cup Coppa Sergio Valci, which was first named the Coppa ACDV in 1985 then renamed in 1994, and the Vatican Suppercoppa, which started in 2005 and sees the winner of the Vatican City Championship face the Coppa Sergio Valci winners.

In American football, Pope Leo XIV is a fan of the National Football League's Chicago Bears and was gifted a custom Chicago Bears jersey by United States vice president JD Vance following his inauguration as Pope. Leo XIV played American football in his youth and began playing association football at his seminary in Peru. He played as a defender.

=== Baseball ===
Pope Leo XIV is a lifelong fan of the Chicago White Sox of Major League Baseball, and was in attendance at US Cellular Field (now known as Rate Field) for Game 1 of the 2005 World Series. A mural depicting Leo XIV was installed at the Rate Field in May 2025. That month, Topps released a limited-edition baseball card depicting Leo XIV, with 133,535 copies being sold within the first week.

In June 2025, Chicago White Sox catching coach Drew Butera has said that the team is investigating the possibility of outreach into Vatican City, and Jonathan Cannon suggested the possibility of playing a game in Rome. In October 2025, Catholicos-Patriarch Awa III, also from Chicago, jokingly gifted Leo XIV a Chicago Cubs jersey in reference to the Cubs–White Sox rivalry. In November 2025, during Leo XIV's visit to Turkey and Lebanon, journalist Chris Livesay gifted the Pope a baseball bat previously owned by White Sox player Nellie Fox.

=== Basketball ===
Pope John Paul II and Pope Francis were both honorary members of the Harlem Globetrotters basketball team. Pope Leo XIV has shown support for Villanova University athletics, especially the Villanova Wildcats men's basketball team. In 2025, Italian street artist TVBoy created a mural in Rome depicting Leo XIV wearing a Chicago Bulls jersey.

In November 2026, the Villanova University and University of Notre Dame men's and women's basketball teams travelled to Rome for the opener of the 2026–27 season. Leo XIV attended the games, showing support for both teams and receiving gifts from them.

== Individual sports ==
=== Athletics ===
Vatican City and the Italian Olympic Committee had an agreement to set up an official athletics team with the intention of making the country to be able to compete in international sporting tournaments such as the Summer Olympics. The official athletics team, Vatican Athletics, was established on 10 January 2019, with initial accredited members that included Swiss Guards, nuns, priests, museum workers, and maintenance workers, as well as two migrant Muslim Africans as honorary members. Vatican Athletics is Vatican City's first official sporting association. Although not affiliated with World Athletics, the organization is affiliated with the Italian Athletics Federation and is the first sports team to have legal status in the country. Four days after the organization was established, the team earned its first podium finish on 14 January 2019, with Don Vincenzo Puccio, a Sicilian priest who won a silver at the Maratona di Messina, a marathon in Messina, in a time of 2:31:53.

The national team has also competed at international tournaments such as the Mediterranean Games and the Championships of the Small States of Europe. Runner Sara Carnicelli competed at both of these, becoming the first athlete from the Vatican City to participate in a multi-sport event at the 2022 Mediterranean Games. She also became the first official international medalist from the country when she won a bronze medal at the 2022 Championships of the Small States of Europe in Marsa, Malta. However, because of an agreement with European Athletics and the Athletic Association of Small States of Europe, she had to give the bronze medal to Roberta Schembri of Malta, who finished in fourth place; she was then awarded an honorary medal. The nation competed at the following edition of the championships, which were held in Gibraltar on 22 June 2024, where hurdler Giuseppe Zaparatta won a bronze medal when he placed third in the men's 110 metres hurdles.

=== Cycling ===
Prior to becoming a member of the Union Cycliste Internationale (UCI), Vatican City was used as a venue for the 1974 Giro d'Italia, where it was used as a starting point for the course. The riders paid homage to Pope Paul VI before starting the race; eventually, Eddy Merckx of Belgium won the race. In 2025, the Giro came to Vatican City again, riding through the Vatican Gardens in the neutralized part of stage 21 and the peloton stood still for a moment for a speech by Pope Leo XIV.

Vatican Cycling (Note: Vatican Cycling, Vatican Padel, and Vatican Taekwondo are part of Vatican Athletics.) became a member of the UCI in September 2021, becoming the first national governing body of Vatican City to be recognized by a world governing body. The first two cycling activities Vatican Cycling organized upon becoming a member of the UCI were dedicated to para-cyclist Alex Zanardi, who's considered to be one of "Italy's greatest athletes". The following year, Dutch cyclist Rien Schuurhuis became the first athlete to represent Vatican City as a regular scoring competitor after competing in the men's road race at the 2022 UCI Road World Championships in Wollongong, Australia, although he did not finish the race; Remco Evenepoel of Belgium won the race. Schuurhuis also competed for the nation in the same event at the 2023 edition across Scotland and ending in Glasgow, and also did not finish the race; Mathieu van der Poel of the Netherlands won the race. Despite being born in the Netherlands, Schuurhuis was eligible to represent Vatican City due to his marriage with Chiara Porro, the Ambassador of Australia to the Holy See.

=== Padel ===
Vatican Padel was established on 8 November 2018 and became a member of the International Padel Federation in 2022, becoming the third national governing body of Vatican City to be recognized by a world governing body. Prior to the national team's debut, the national governing body organized inclusive padel matches on 5 April 2024, for families with children who have autism and Down syndrome. The following day, Argentinian padel player Fernando Belasteguín, who ranked number one in the world for 16 consecutive years, visited the nation for the International Day of Sport for Development and Peace.

The national team made their debut in April 2024, with three friendly matches against the San Marino national team in the Villa Pamphili Padel Club in Rome. The national team lost to San Marino 3–0. This match served as a precursor before their debut at the qualifiers for the 2024 European Padel Championships in Cagliari, Italy, and the 2024 Small States of Europe Padel Championships in Luxembourg.

=== Taekwondo ===
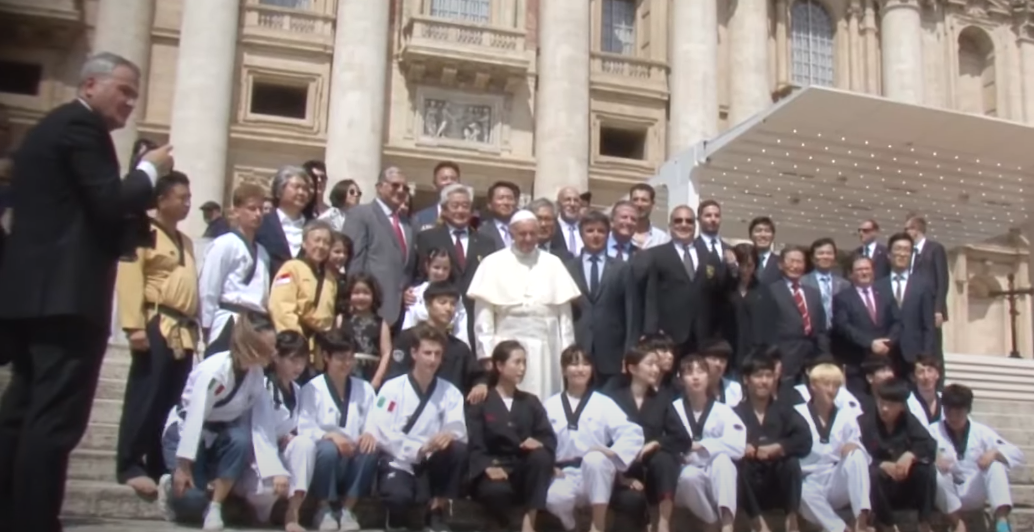
Pope Francis and World Taekwondo president Choue Chung-won, among others, with the World Taekwondo Demonstration Team

The Vatican City and World Taekwondo hold a close relationship with each other. The World Taekwondo Demonstration Team first visited the nation in 2016, and has made a subsequent visit with North Korean taekwondo practitioners in 2018 for a "demonstration for peace". In 2017, Pope Francis was granted an honorary black belt by the federation. In 2026, Pope Leo XIV was granted an honorary 10th dan certificate and gifted a dobok by Choue Chung-won.

Prior to becoming a member, the nation held courses for the sport for students at the Saint Pius X Institute under a partnership with the Italian Taekwondo Federation. Then, Vatican Taekwondo officially became a member of World Taekwondo on 23 November 2021, becoming the second national governing body of the nation to be recognized by a world governing body, after Vatican Cycling.

In 2026, Diego Di Mattia became Vatican Taekwondo's first registered athlete. He competed in the under-30 male individual event at the 2026 World Poomsae Championships, becoming the first Vatican athlete to appear at a taekwondo world championship. He was defeated in the preliminary round.

== See also ==
- Index of Vatican City-related articles
