= Vatican Taekwondo =

Official governing body

- Sport: Taekwondo
- Jurisdiction: Vatican City
- Affiliation: World Taekwondo
- Affiliation date: 2021
- Regional affiliation: European Taekwondo Union
- Affiliation date: 2021
- Headquarters: Dicastery for Culture and Education
- President: Giampaolo Mattei
- Secretary: Marco Alpigiani
- (Vatican City)

Vatican Taekwondo is the official governing body for the sport of taekwondo in the Vatican City. The body is a part of Vatican Athletics, and is the second Vatican sports governing body to gain membership of a world governing body after becoming a member of World Taekwondo in November 2021; it is also a member of the European Taekwondo Union. The president of the organisation is Giampaolo Mattei.

== History ==
=== Prior to recognition ===
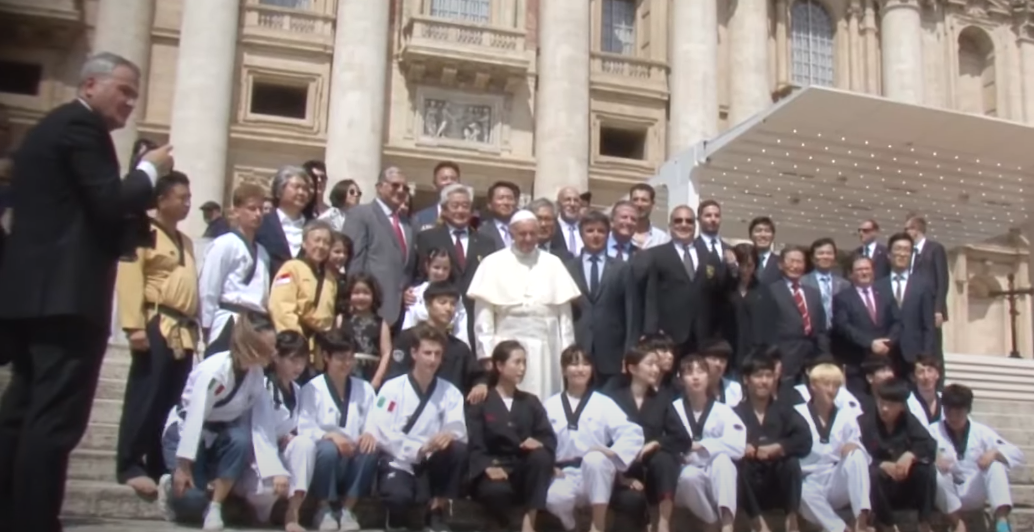
Pope Francis and World Taekwondo president Choue Chung-won, among others, with the World Taekwondo Demonstration Team

Before the creation of Vatican Taekwondo, the Vatican and World Taekwondo held a close relationship with each other. The latter's demonstration team first visited the nation in 2016 during the first Global Conference on Faith & Sport for an exhibition poomsae performance. The team made a subsequent appearance in 2018 with five South Korean and North Korean taekwondo practitioners for a "demonstration for peace".

In 2017, then-World Taekwondo president Choue Chung-won, accompanied by president of the Italian Taekwondo Federation (FITA) Angelo Cito, met with Pope Francis. There, Choue had gifted an honorary 10th dan black belt to the Pope. Pope Francis also stated his interest in humanitarian activities through the sport, citing the Taekwondo Humanitarian Foundation which teaches taekwondo to refugees. In the Vatican, taekwondo courses were held for twenty students at the Saint Pius X Institute through a partnership with FITA in 2020.

=== Creation and recognition ===
Vatican Taekwondo was established in 2021 as part of Vatican Athletics. The body was voted the 211th member of World Taekwondo on 23 November 2021 at the World Taekwondo General Assembly, becoming the second sports organisation in the nation recognized by a world governing body, after Vatican Cycling. It is also a member of the European Taekwondo Union.

=== Competition ===
In 2026, Diego Di Mattia became Vatican Taekwondo's first registered athlete. He competed in the under-30 male individual event at the 2026 World Poomsae Championships, becoming the first Vatican athlete to appear at a taekwondo world championship. He was defeated in the preliminary round.

== Management and status ==
Giampaolo Mattei has been the president of Vatican Taekwondo since it began, and the secretary is Marco Alpigiani.

== See also ==
- Vatican Athletics
- Sport in Vatican City
