= Women in Vatican City =

Women account for approximately 5.5% of the citizenry of Vatican City. According to the Herald Sun in March 2011, there were only 32 females out of 572 citizens issued with Vatican passports and one of them was a nun. In 2013, Worldcrunch reported that there were around 30 women who were citizens of Vatican City, including two South American women, two Poles, and three from Switzerland. The majority of Vatican women at the time were from Italy.

== Female residents ==
Among the women who lived in Vatican City was one of the daughters of an electrician, who later got married and lost her right to live in the city. Another woman who lives in Vatican City was Magdalena Wolińska-Riedi, who is a Polish translator and wife of one of the Swiss Guards.

== Vatican City citizens ==
Among the women who have citizenship in Vatican City, there is one officer in the military, two teachers (one teaches in high school, the other teaches in kindergarten), and one academic. Women obtain Vatican City citizenship by marriage (as a baptized Catholic) to their husbands; however such citizenship "lasts only for the duration of their stay" in Vatican City.

== Value of women ==
In the past, women were not allowed to open a bank account in Vatican City, but, during the leadership of Pope John Paul II and Pope Benedict XVI, the value of women in the city was highlighted. One of Pope Benedict XVI's assistant editors and confidential adviser was a woman, Ingrid Stampa. On April 21, 2013, The Telegraph reported that Pope Francis will be appointing "more women to key Vatican" positions. In May 2019, Francis appointed three women as consultors to the General Secretariat for the Synod of Bishops on Young People, Faith, and Vocational Discernment, marking a historic first for the Church. In addition to this, L'Osservatore Romano – the daily newspaper in Vatican City – is now publishing supplementary pages that address women's issues. Women are not allowed to be ordained to the presbyterate or episcopate, though a commission is currently studying the question of whether women can serve as un-ordained deacons.

== Clothing ==
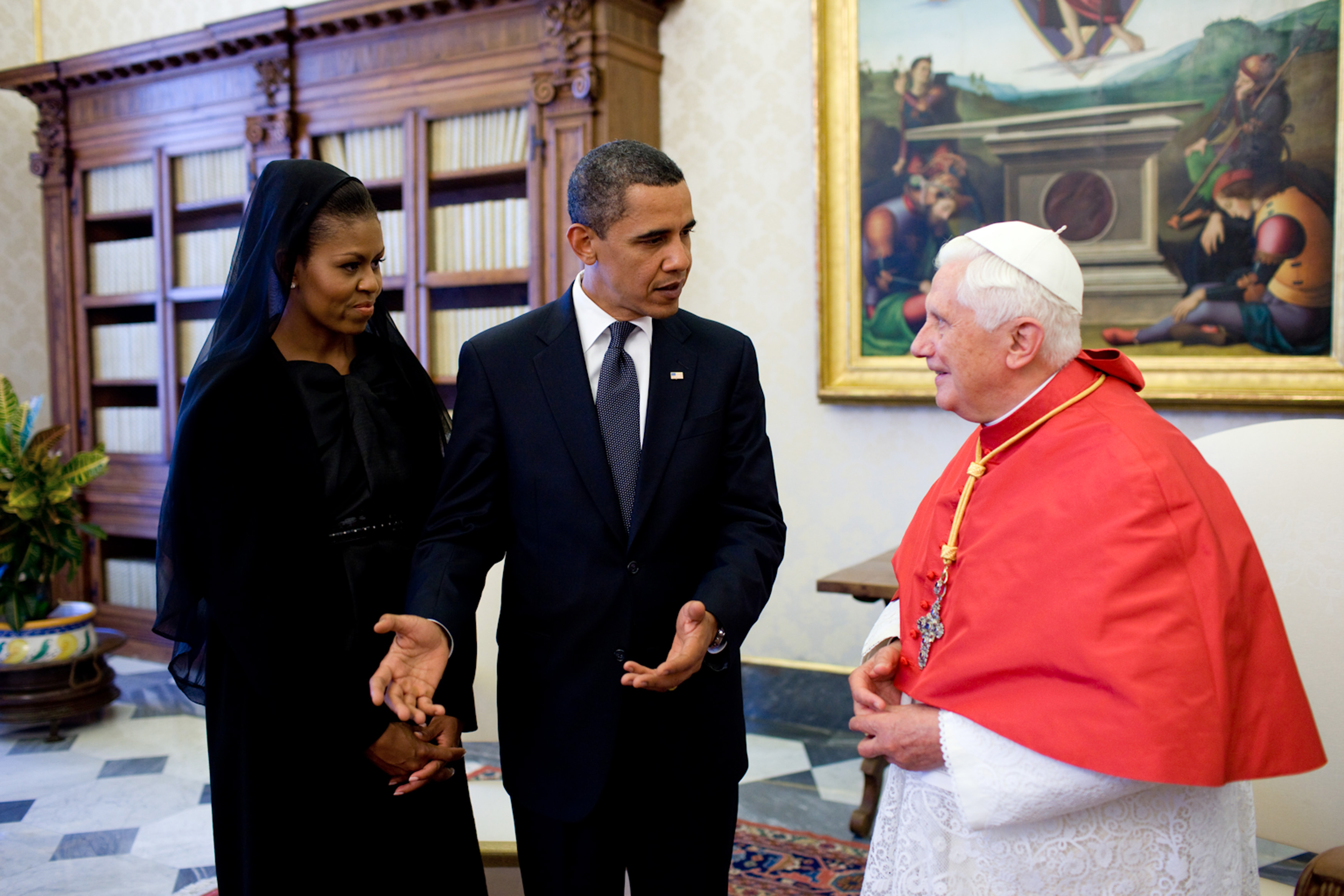
President Barack Obama and First Lady Michelle Obama meet with Pope Benedict XVI at the Vatican on July 10, 2009.

Women (and men) visiting St. Peter's Basilica, the Sistine Chapel or the Vatican Museums in Vatican City are expected to wear appropriate attire. Low cut or sleeveless clothing, shorts, miniskirts and hats (for men, indoors) are not allowed. Women may or may not wear the traditional "black hat or veil". Dress code for Papal audiences is somewhat more formal. Women cannot wear clothing that does not cover the shoulders and the knees.

The restrictions on clothing are very strict and the Swiss Guards have the authority of the Pope to restrict access to anyone who is not following the dress code. Those who are not following the dress code can purchase lightweight ponchos outside the museum.

Protocol for private and official audiences with the Pope says that ladies should wear a black dress, without a neckline, and cover their heads with a veil, also black; no large handbags or flashy jewellery; yes to a string of pearls. It is also allowed to meet the Pope wearing typical national or regional costumes, but red is banned (reserved for cardinals' robes) and purple for its liturgical significance (colour of penance), while the "privilege of white" is only for Catholic queens. Raisa Gorbacheva's visit in 1989 was famous: she presented herself to the Pope in a red dress and without a veil.

== Voting rights ==
The Pope, who serves as the head of state, is elected by the College of Cardinals of the Catholic Church. The College is part of the Holy See, which forms a separate sovereign entity from Vatican City. Cardinals in the Catholic Church are required to be male, with voting Cardinals usually Bishops, and only men are eligible to be elected Pope. With that being said, however, the cardinalate is a privilege and office bestowed by the Pope; it is not a separate, fourth degree of Holy Orders (along with deacon, priest, and Bishop), though it ranks above them, so theoretically, the laws could be amended to allow for women to be Cardinals.

== Divorce ==
Vatican City is one of two sovereign states that do not allow divorce, the other being the Philippines (see Divorce in the Philippines).

== Abortion ==
The law of Vatican City recognizes the canon law of the Catholic Church as its primary source of law and primary reference for legal interpretation, and it adopts several Italian laws for practical purposes, such as the Italian penal code in force in 1929 with local modifications. Canon 1397 §2 and articles 381 to 385 of the penal code both prohibit abortion without explicitly mentioning any exception, but article 49 of the penal code lists the principle of necessity to save one's life, which removes punishment for any action that would otherwise be a crime. The authors of the Italian penal code considered that this article allowed abortion to save the woman's life, but the Church's interpretation of the canon law is more restrictive, allowing only indirect abortion under the principle of double effect, such as treatment for an ectopic pregnancy or cancer. In these cases the procedure is aimed only at preserving the woman's life, and the death of the fetus, although foreseen, is not willed either as an end or as a means for obtaining the intended effect.

== Donne in Vaticano ==
In September 2016, Vatican authorities approved the creation of Donne in Vaticano, the first women-only association of the Vatican. The members of the association are journalists, theologians, and economists. It is led by founding president Tracey McClure. Its initial secretary was Susan Volpini, who later co-founded the Vatican City women's national football team.

== See also ==
- Index of Vatican City-related articles
- Privilège du blanc
- Women in Europe
