= Diego Di Mattia =

Italian Taekwondo practitioner

Personal information
- National team: Vatican City
- Home town: Rome

Sport
- Sport: Taekwondo

Diego Di Mattia is an Italian taekwondo practitioner. He is the first registered athlete with Vatican Taekwondo.

Diego Di Mattia is from Rome and practiced taekwondo in his youth. He returned to the sport at 24 years old in 2026 when he was invited by Vatican Athletics to represent the Vatican City. His father worked in the Vatican City for many years. He trained with the Italian Taekwondo Federation and met with Pope Leo XIV before competing in the under-30 male individual event at the 2026 World Poomsae Championships, becoming the first Vatican athlete to appear at a taekwondo world championship. He was defeated in the preliminary round by an athlete from Vietnam.
