= Vatican Cycling =

Sports governing body in Vatican City

- Sport: Cycling
- Jurisdiction: Vatican City
- Affiliation: Union Cycliste Internationale
- Affiliation date: 2021
- Regional affiliation: Union Européenne de Cyclisme
- Headquarters: Dicastery for Culture and Education
- President: Emiliano Morbidelli
- Vice president(s): Massimiliano Coluccio
- Secretary: Simone Ciochetti
- (Vatican City)

Vatican Cycling is the national governing body for cycle sport in Vatican City. Established as a part of Vatican Athletics, it is the first Vatican sports governing body to gain membership of a world governing body after becoming a member of the Union Cycliste Internationale on 24 September 2021; it is also a member of the Union Européenne de Cyclisme. Vatican Cycling governs and holds events regarding cycle sport within the nation and selects athletes to represent Vatican City in international competitions such as the World Championships. The current president of the body is Emiliano Morbidelli.

== History ==
=== Cycle sport before Vatican Cycling ===
Originally, cycle sport and cycling itself was initially frowned upon by the Catholic Church as it was deemed dangerous and risky. Sports that had been labeled as such include boxing and rugby which were deemed violent, and football being frowned upon because of its Anglo-Saxon and "Protestant roots." L'Osservatore Romano, a Vatican newspaper, labeled cycling as "true global, transport anarchy".

Cycle sport in Europe proliferated at the start of the 20th century to the point of the creation of races such as the Tour de France and Giro d'Italia. Pope Pius X blessed an amateur cycling race that started in Rome; Pope Benedict XV did the same for the same race a few years later. Vatican City was even used as a venue for the 1974 Giro d'Italia, where it was used as a starting point for the course. The riders paid homage to Pope Paul VI before starting the race.

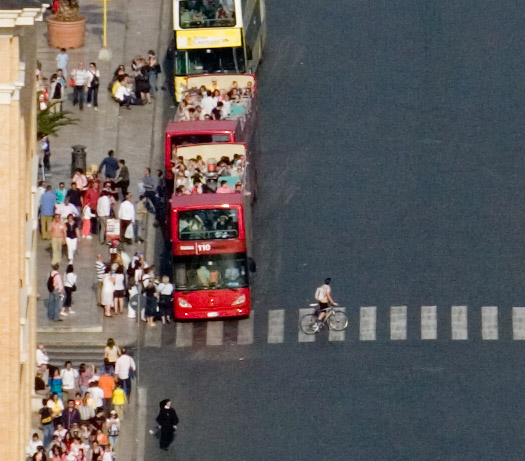
A man (pictured on a zebra crossing) seen cycling in Vatican City in 2007

In 2019, members of the Union Européenne de Cyclisme, the European governing body for cycle sport, and Confédération Africaine de Cyclisme, the African governing body for cycle sport, visited Pope Francis at the Apostolic Palace, as they had their respective congresses earlier in Rome. During the visit, the Pope spoke about how road cycling included merits of teamwork and likened it to helping others.

=== Creation of Vatican Cycling ===
Vatican Cycling was created as a part of Vatican Athletics, the nation's official athletics team, as the national governing body for cycle sport within Vatican City. It is housed by the Dicastery for Culture and Education at Via della Conciliazione. The organization became a member of the Union Cycliste Internationale (UCI) and Union Européenne de Cyclisme during the 190th Congress of the UCI on 24 September 2021. The membership of Vatican Cycling to the UCI made it the first Vatican sports governing body to become a member of a world governing body of an Olympic sport. As of 2022, Vatican Cycling has 55 members.

== Management and reception ==
The first president was Giampaolo Mattei, while the current president of Vatican Cycling is Emiliano Morbidelli, who is also a long-distance runner who had competed for the nation in international competition such as the Championships of the Small States of Europe. The vice president of the organization is Massimiliano Coluccio, while its secretary is Simone Ciochetti. Former cyclist Valerio Agnoli is also part of the management team as the external relationship manager of the body.

== Events ==
The first two cycling activities Vatican Cycling organized were held in c. 2020 and were dedicated to para-cyclist Alex Zanardi, who is considered to be one of "Italy's greatest athletes". It has also held charity and disability awareness cycling events within the Vatican.

Dutch-born cyclist Rien Schuurhuis was the first athlete to represent Vatican City as a regular scoring competitor after competing in the men's road race at the 2022 UCI Road World Championships in Wollongong, Australia, although he did not finish the race. Schuurhuis was eligible to represent Vatican City as he gained citizenship through his marriage with Chiara Porro, the former Ambassador of Australia to the Holy See. He has also represented Vatican City at the 2023 and 2024 editions of the world championships, and the 2024 European Championships, all in the same event.

== See also ==
- Sport in Vatican City
