= Francis Alphonsus Jayarajah =

Italian cricketer (born 1947)

Francis Alphonsus Jayarajah (born 18 June 1947) is a Sri Lankan-born Italian cricketer. Alfonso, as he is known by most, is a left-arm bowler and a right-handed batsman. He was born in Vavuniya, studied at St. Patricks College in Jaffna, and educated at the Sapienza University of Rome.

For over 40 years, Alfonso Jayarajah, a Sri Lankan émigré, has been fostering cricket in Italy. Jayarajah was the first Cricket Captain for Italy in the nation's first cricket match, touring the UK in 1984. He was captain of the National Team until 1994, and was last selected in the Italy national cricket team at the 1997 ICC Trophy in Malaysia. He was the first person of colour to Captain Italy in any sport.

Having arrived in Rome in 1968, on a scholarship from Opus Dei for university studies he was a member of the Rome Sports Association and played in the Rome Ashes during the 60's and 70's in the Villa Doria Pamphili grounds. He currently is the President of Roma Capannelle Cricket Club, of which he is a founding member, originally named Doria Pamphili CC in 1980 and still today one of the leading cricket clubs in Italy.

Also a qualified ECB Coach & Umpire, he is a founding member of St Peter's Cricket Club, Holy See since its birth in 2014.

He has been awarded by the Italian National Olympic Committee the Medaglia di bronzo in 2013 as an Athlete and the Stella di bronzo in 2015 as a sports manager.
