= Vatican Athletics =

Athletics club of the Holy See

- Athletica Vaticana
- Jurisdiction: Vatican City
- Founded: 2019
- Headquarters: Vatican City
- President: Giampaolo Mattei
- (Vatican City)

Vatican Athletics (Latin: Athletica Vaticana) is a sports organization associated with Vatican City. Established as an athletics club of the city state, it has been described as the Vatican's first official sports federation. The athletics club is affiliated with the Italian Athletics Federation.

The organization is home to the Vatican's cycling and taekwondo associations, which became members of the UCI and World Taekwondo respectively in 2021. Vatican Athletics' padel association is also a member of the non-Olympic International Padel Federation. As of March 2023, cricket and Paralympic sports teams have become part of Vatican Athletics, with plans to also incorporate fencing, basketball and potentially football.

Vatican City is not yet eligible to compete at the Olympic Games, as that would require the affiliation of the country to the governing bodies of at least five Olympic sports.

== History ==
The Holy See and the Italian Olympic Committee had an agreement to set up an official athletics team with the intention making the Vatican City able to compete in international sporting tournaments including the Summer Olympics. The Vatican will have to secure membership of the International Association of Athletics Federations to be able to compete internationally as well as set up a National Olympic Committee to be able to participate in the Olympics.

Vatican Athletics was launched on 10 January 2019 with 60 initial accredited members which includes Swiss Guards, nuns, priests, museum workers, and maintenance workers as well as two migrant Muslim Africans as honorary members. Vatican Athletics is the first sports team to have legal status in the Vatican and is officially affiliated with the Italian Athletics Federation.

The first podium finish of Vatican Athletics was at the Maratona di Messina, a marathon in Messina. Don Vincenzo Puccio, a Sicilian priest, won a silver medal for the team.

As a national team, Vatican Athletics are aiming to participate in the Games of the Small States of Europe. They attempted to make a debut in the 2019 edition, but they, along with the Faroe Islands, were barred from participating due to an absence of a national Olympic committee.

In 2021, the International Cycling Union was the first Olympic sports federation to admit Vatican Athletics to their ranks.

In 2022, one athlete, Sara Carnicelli, represented the Vatican City at the Mediterranean Games in Algeria in a non-scoring manner.

Later in 2022 Rien Schuurhuis participated in the road race for men at the UCI Cycling World Championships. Schuurhuis was the first Vatican athlete who competed in a scoring manner at an international championship.

A team consisting of five athletes represented the Vatican City at the 2024 Championships of the Small States of Europe in Gibraltar, winning one bronze medal through hurdler Giuseppe Zapparata.

== Team image ==
Vatican Athletics uses a render of the Vatican coat of arms which consists of two keys and a papal tiara as its symbol. The team's uniform are in blue, yellow, and white, the latter two being colors found in the Vatican flag. The team have Italian firm Erreà as its official uniform supplier.

== See also ==
- Index of Vatican City-related articles
- Sport in Vatican City
- Vatican City national football team
- Vatican cricket team
