= Eugenie Tcheugoue =

Vatican football player

Personal information
- National team: Vatican City
- Education: Pontifical Biblical Institute

Sport
- Sport: Women's association football
- Position: Goalkeeper, center forward

Eugenie Tcheugoue is a Cameroonian and Vatican football player serving as the captain of the Vatican City women's national football team. She is also a staff member of the Dicastery for the Laity, Family and Life and served on the board of directors of the John Paul II Youth Foundation.

== Biography ==
Eugenie Tcheugoue grew up in Cameroon and played football in high school. After graduating with a degree in theology in Cameroon, she traveled to Rome to study at the Pontifical Biblical Institute. There, she got a certificate in biblical exegesis and wrote her thesis paper on the Epistle to the Romans. She began working for the Dicastery for the Laity, Family and Life, where she worked on organizing the ad limina visits of bishops to Rome. She also served on the board of directors of the John Paul II Youth Foundation, leaving the position in 2025.

The Vatican City women's national football team formed in 2019 with Tcheugoue as its captain. The team is composed of amateur laywomen, and Tcheugoue serves as the team's goalkeeper and center forward.
