= Joël van der Weide =

Dutch athlete (born 1999)

Personal information
- Born: 20 June 1999 (age 27) Best, Netherlands

Sport
- Country: Netherlands
- Sport: Taekwondo
- Event: Recognized Poomsae
- Club: Sportcentrum Tapia
- Coached by: Mieke Tapia

Achievements and titles
- World finals: 3rd place, bronze medalist(s)
- Regional finals: 1st place, gold medalist(s)
- Highest world ranking: 1 (2024-2026)
Medal record
Men's Taekwondo
Representing Netherlands
Senior
World Championships
Bronze medal – third place	2026 Chuncheon	Poomsae, m under 30
European Championships
Gold medal – first place	2019 Antalya	Poomsae, m under 30
Gold medal – first place	2021 Seixal	Poomsae, m under 30
Gold medal – first place	2023 Innsbruck	Poomsae, m under 30
Silver medal – second place	2025 Tallinn	Poomsae, m under 30
Bronze medal – third place	2017 Rhodes	Poomsae, m under 30
Bronze medal – third place	2023 Innsbruck	Poomsae, Pair under 30
World Beach Championships
Silver medal – second place	2018 Rhodes	Poomsae, f under 30
European Beach Championships
Bronze medal – third place	2019 Antalya	Poomsae, m under 30
Junior
European Championships
Gold medal – first place	2013 La Nucia	Poomsae, m under 14
Gold medal – first place	2015 Belgrade	Poomsae, m under 17
Gold medal – first place	2015 Belgrade	Poomsae, Pair under 17

Joël van der Weide (born 20 June 1999, sometimes spelled as Joel van der Weide) is a Dutch taekwondo athlete and nine-time European Poomsae medalist.

== Taekwondo career ==
Joël van der Weide started practicing the Korean martial arts taekwondo at age six and started competing internationally at nine years old. He had at first tried out kyorugi (full-contact fighting), but then switched to poomsae.

He participated in his first major tournament in 2013, the European Poomsae Championships in La Nucia, where he won gold in traditional poomsae in the cadets' category. At the European Championships in 2015 held in Belgrade, he became European Champion in the juniors' as well as the pairs' competitions, the latter alongside teammate Angel Crystal.

At the 2017 European Championships in Rhodes, he claimed a bronze medal at the men's senior poomsae competition. In 2018, he placed second at the men's poomsae competition at the World Beach Championships, also held in Rhodes. In 2019 and 2021, van der Weide became European Champion in the men's traditional poomsae competition at the European Championships in Antalya and Seixal, respectively.

In 2023 in Innsbruck, he won the European Championships in men's individual poomsae for the third time. Additionally, he claimed a bronze medal in the pairs' traditional poomsae competition alongside his younger sister Dewi van der Weide.

At the 2025 European Poomsae Championships in Tallinn, van der Weide won the silver medal in the men's individual under-30 recognized poomsae competition, finishing behind French athlete Pierre-Malo Tranchant.

== Personal life ==
Van der Weide completed a Professional Education and Training program in Sport and Exercise at Summa College in Eindhoven and achieved a Bachelor of Arts through the Higher Professional Education program in Sports Science at Fontys University of Applied Sciences. He works as a taekwondo and self-defense instructor as well as a motivational speaker. He is also a poomsae coach at his taekwondo club.
