= Tracey McClure =

American journalist

Tracey McClure is an American journalist and the founding president of Donne in Vaticano, the first women's association in Vatican City.

McClure was born in the United States and grew up in the Washington, D.C., area. She then attended Smith College in Massachusetts. After studying abroad in Rome, she moved there permanently and began working as a journalist. She worked for over 20 years as a producer, broadcaster, and reporter at Vatican Radio, Vatican City's official broadcasting service. She has also worked for the English-language version of the semi-official Vatican newspaper L'Osservatore Romano and for the city-state's Dicastery for Communication.

Her work has included co-creating the radio project "The Church’s Hidden Women," which brings to light the stories of women in the Roman Catholic Church.

In 2016, McClure co-founded Donne in Vaticano ("Women in the Vatican"), the first women's organization in the heavily male-dominated Vatican City. She and the group's other organizers initially faced resistance within the Vatican—including from fellow women, some of whom expressed concern the group would constitute a "subversive association or a trade union"—and it took four years to get off the ground. However, it was eventually formally recognized by the city-state's authorities. Donne in Vaticano aims to serve as a "solidarity network" for women working in the Vatican. In addition to being a co-founder of the organization, McClure serves as its first president.
