= Melissa Hitchman =

Australian diplomat

Melissa Hitchman was Australia's Ambassador to the Holy See from 2016 to 2020, when she was replaced by Chiara Porro.

Hitchman graduated with a Master of National Security and a Bachelor of Economics from the Australian National University.

Diplomatic posts
Preceded by John A. McCarthy	Australian Ambassador to the Holy See; 2016–2020	Succeeded by Chiara Porro
