= John A. McCarthy =

Australian Ambassador to the Holy See

John McCarthy AM KC
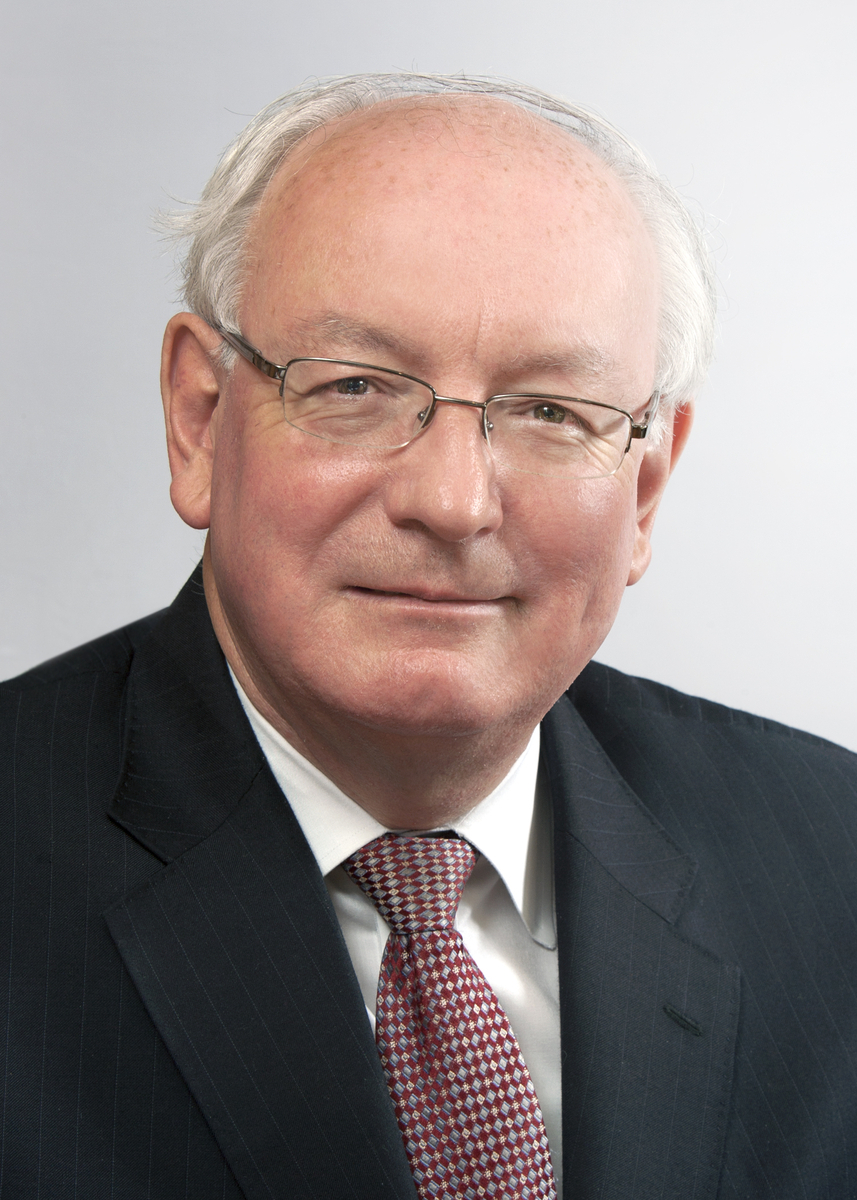

Australian Ambassador to the Holy See
- In office November 2012 – 2016
- Preceded by: Tim Fischer
- Succeeded by: Melissa Hitchman

Personal details
- Born: 20 October 1947 (age 79) Parkes, New South Wales, Australia
- Party: Labor Party
- Spouse: Christine Anne McCarthy DSS
- Children: 6 (3 daughters, 3 sons)
- Education: University of Sydney, University of Virginia
- Profession: Barrister
- Website: Embassy to the Holy See

John Anthony McCarthy AM KC GCPO KCSG (born 20 October 1947) was the Australian Ambassador to the Holy See from 2012 to 2016, following the appointment of Bob Carr as foreign minister.

== Early life and education ==
McCarthy was born on 20 October 1947 in Parkes, New South Wales, the son of Anthony and Eileen McCarthy. He grew up in country New South Wales and attended St Bernard's College, Katoomba. In 1965, he moved to Sydney to study at the University of Sydney as a resident of St John's College. He graduated Bachelor of Arts in 1968 and Bachelor of Laws in 1971. In 1974, he was awarded a post-graduate scholarship to the University of Virginia and graduated Master of Laws in 1975.

== Professional career ==
McCarthy was admitted as a solicitor of the Supreme Court of NSW in 1972, as a barrister of the Supreme Court in 1976 and appointed Queens Counsel in 1988. McCarthy has appeared in the High Court of Australia, Privy Council, Federal Court of Australia, Supreme Court of New South Wales, Australian Industrial Relations Commission, NSW Industrial Relations Commission, Family Court of Australia, NSW Land and Environment Court, Independent Commission Against Corruption (ICAC), District Court (NSW) and Magistrates Court (NSW).

McCarthy has had an ongoing involvement with constitutional, electoral and organisational issues relating to Indigenous Australian associations, educational institutions and sporting organisations. McCarthy was senior counsel for the Dunghutti people in 1996 and participated in the negotiation and settling of the first Deed of Agreement (209 years after the first white settlement) between the Crown in New South Wales and an Indigenous Australian people in respect of native title in Australia. He then appeared as senior counsel in the Dunghutti case in the Federal Court in 1997, in which for the first time on the Australian mainland there was a determination of native title under the Native Title Act 1993.

McCarthy has represented Catholic bishops and Catholic agencies and institutions in many cases. He has also acted as senior counsel for the national president of the St Vincent de Paul Society in Australia. McCarthy is senior counsel for the Church of the Torres Strait, an indigenous church of former Anglicans and for the Anglican Catholic Church of Australia, both of which are seeking full communion with the Catholic Church under the Apostolic (Papal) Constitution, Anglicanorum Coetibus.

McCarthy has appeared in cases in the High Court on native title, trade practices and electoral matters. He has also appeared in several cases in relation to the NRMA and the Co-op Bookshop. He was also senior counsel during the revision of their constitutions and rules. Other important cases in which he has appeared include the Maralinga and Voyager compensation cases (1991–95). McCarthy has appeared in ICAC inquiries, a Royal Commission and similar public investigations and inquiries.

McCarthy became senior counsel for the Labor Party in NSW in 1988. He appeared for the ALP in courts of disputed returns, electoral boundary commissions and supreme court proceedings. He also advised the ALP National Secretariat on legal and constitutional issues.

=== Other professional and community service ===
McCarthy has received a number of statutory appointments, including the Legal Aid Commission of New South Wales (Review Committee), Administrative Decisions Tribunal of New South Wales (Legal Services Division), University of Sydney Senate, Sydney Cricket Ground Trust, Australian Law Reform Commission, Olympic Games Sydney 2000 and Museum of Contemporary Art (Sydney).

Other offices in which McCarthy has served include Pro-Chancellor University of Sydney (2005–10), President of the St Thomas More Society – the Guild of Catholic Lawyers (1993-05), Board Member of St Margaret's Hospital, Sydney (1997–99), and Australian Board member of international Catholic charity Aid to the Church in Need (1994–present). Since 2007 he has been a member of the Order of Malta. He is a co-founder of the Chester A. Arthur Society.

McCarthy has been a member of Australian Labor Party (ALP) since 1963. He has been a branch official, NSW Conference delegate, National Conference delegate and a member of ALP policy committees.

In 2006, McCarthy received a Papal Knighthood, being appointed Knight Commander of the Order of St Gregory the Great by the Holy See for services to the Catholic Church and the wider Australian community. In 2012, he received an honorary award from the University of Sydney when he was appointed an Honorary Fellow of the University.

=== Ambassador to the Holy See ===
On 29 April 2012, Australian prime minister, Julia Gillard, and foreign minister, Bob Carr, announced the appointment of McCarthy as Australia's Ambassador to the Holy See.

McCarthy discussed the position with The Catholic Weekly: "It is always a privilege and an honour to be called on to represent your country. I am thankful to our Government for the opportunity to represent Australia in this important role in this great place, and to be able to go with Christine to the Eternal City and to have the occasion, opportunity and the presence of the Holy Father (i.e., the Pope) to put Australia’s case and to represent my country in that way. I am on a 90-degree learning curve, I learn more every day. Ambassadors to the Holy See go back into the fable of time. The journey I undertake for Australia is the oldest continuous political journey in the world and in history. It goes back to the fourth century of the Christian era."

Acknowledging his predecessor in Rome: "Tim Fischer is a benchmark; he is also a challenge. There are some challenges I will not take up. I will never compete with Tim about trains and about the range of hats that I may have. However, I do hope to follow him in being able to put to the dicasteries and congregations of the Holy See, positions that Australia has on human rights, inter-faith dialogue, food security, peace in our world and region, all areas in which the Holy See has influence."

Taking up his posting in August 2012, McCarthy presented his diplomatic credentials to Pope Benedict XVI on 5 November 2012.

He led the development of St Peters Cricket Club in 2013 and then the Vatican Cricket Team in 2014.

McCarthy concluded his mission to the Holy See on 29 January 2016.

McCarthy was appointed a Member of the Order of Australia in the 2025 King's Birthday Honours for "significant service to the Catholic Church in Australia, to the law, and to sports administration".

== Family life ==
McCarthy married Christine Anne Slattery in the Chapel of St John's College, University of Sydney in 1973, and was married for 50 years until Christine's death in November 2023. Christine McCarthy DSS was an accomplished musician, concert pianist, accompanist and composer, the National Convenor of the Society for Eucharistic Adoration, served on the Liturgical Commission for the Archdiocese of Sydney, and wrote and lectured extensively on Catholic themes. The McCarthys have three daughters and three sons, Theresa, Claire, Anthony, James, Helena and Gerard. Their second daughter, Claire McCarthy is an acclaimed Australian film director. Their second son, Father James McCarthy, is a priest of the Archdiocese of Sydney; he studied for the priesthood in Rome and was ordained in 2009.

Diplomatic posts
Preceded by Tim Fischer	Australian Ambassador to the Holy See; 2012–2016	Succeeded by Melissa Hitchman
