= Vatican City cricket team =

- St Peter's Cricket Club

Personnel
- Chairman: HH The Pope (patron); HE Cardinal de Mendonça (president ex officio)

Team information
- City: Vatican City

The Vatican City cricket team is an amateur cricket club established by the Vatican for the Catholic Church to foster ties where the sport is popular, such as in the Commonwealth of Nations including India and the Caribbean, thereby encouraging inter-faith dialogue.

== History ==
Prior to the official establishment of the Vatican Cricket Team, an ad hoc Vatican XI played its first (international) match against the Netherlands-based Fellowship Of Oddly Odd Countries Cricket Club. The match was played on 13 September 2008 at the Stadio dei Marmi where, using an impromptu pitch, the Vatican side scored 107 runs for the loss of just one wicket; FFOP CC was all out for 58, in a 35-over match. Its first cricket match was in May 2008, a friendly game against Roma Capannelle Cricket Club, with the Serie A club winning the match.

In 2013, the "St Peter's Cricket Club", initially the idea of Australia's ambassador to the Holy See, John McCarthy, announced its formation. The club was tasked with recruiting players from among the "300 seminarians and priests housed at Catholic colleges and seminaries around Rome", therefore not Vatican City citizens. The most talented players were to be invited to join the Vatican Cricket Team, or "the Vatican XI". The Vatican plays its home matches at the Roma Capannelle Cricket Ground, home of Roma Capannelle CC, the only international cricket ground in Rome.

The Vatican Cricket Team was established in June 2014 with the initial squad consisting of "priests, deacons and seminarians", primarily recruited from India and some players from England, Sri Lanka and Pakistan also being selected. The team is sponsored by the dicastery for Culture and Education, and is supported by members of the Papal Orders of Knighthood.

== Tour of Portugal 2017 ==
In 2017, the Vatican team visited a cricket stadium in Miranda do Corvo for the third "Light of Faith Tour", being greeted with a Fire Brigade Salute.

== Tour of England 2018 ==
The Vatican Cricket Team undertook its fourth "Light of Faith Tour" in England over the summer of 2018, playing the first fixture on tour against a specially-selected Stonyhurst College Gentlemen's XI from alumni of the famous Roman Catholic independent school. Founded in 1593, Stonyhurst College is a co-educational Catholic boarding and day school, occupying a magnificent Grade I-listed building in Lancashire and the oldest Jesuit school in the world. The tour commenced at Stonyhurst on 4 July 2018 in acknowledgement of the school's long history of combining faith, academics and sporting excellence.

The Vatican XI, comprising priests, deacons and seminarians studying and working in Rome and at the Vatican, then played at Lord's versus an Anglican team, with other matches against a Commonwealth of Nations XI as well as the Royal Household Cricket Club at Windsor. The team previously toured England in September 2014, playing the Church of England and the Royal Household of the British royal family.

== Tour of England 2024 ==
In 2024, the Pope's XI (as the Vatican Cricket Team is colloquially known) again played the King's XI and St. Mary's University at Home Park, near Windsor Castle, Westminster Abbey, and Arundel Castle. All the 2024 squad, consisting of priests and students who seek priesthood, are Keralites from India.

== See also ==
- Sport in Vatican City
- Vatican City national football team
- Papal Orders of Knighthood
- Index of Vatican City-related articles
