= Rien Schuurhuis =

Dutch-born Vatican cyclist

Rien John Schuurhuis
Personal information
- Nickname: The Pope's Cyclist
- Born: 12 August 1982 (age 44) Groningen, Netherlands

Cycling career
- Sport: Cycling
- Current team: Canberra CC
- Discipline: Road cycling
- Role: Rider
- Rider type: Sprinter

Amateur team
- 2021–2024: Vatican Cycling

Professional teams
- 2015–2016: Oliver's Real Food Racing
- 2016: Blank Inc Cycling Team
- 2017–2018: Oliver's Real Food Racing

Rien John Schuurhuis (born 12 August 1982) is a Dutch-born Australian road cyclist and industrial design engineer who competed for the Vatican City in the 2022, 2023 and 2024 UCI Road World Championships. He was the first cyclist and athlete who represented the Vatican City as a regular scoring competitor.

== Biography ==
Schuurhuis was introduced to cycling at a young age saying he "could ride a bike before I could walk," due to the cycling culture of the Netherlands. Schuurhuis holds Dutch citizenship due to his birth, Australian citizenship as his wife Chiara Porro is Australian, and held Vatican citizenship when his wife was the Australian Ambassador to the Holy See. He moved to Rome in 2020. Schuurhuis and Porro have two children, Thomas and George.

Schuurhuis started competing internationally for teams such as Oliver's Real Food Racing and Blank Inc Cycling Team under a Dutch sporting nationality. In 2020 when he moved to Rome, he was "immediately drawn to the values and community spirit of Athletica Vaticana", and in 2021 he started competing for the Vatican City.

Schuurhuis was the first athlete to represent Vatican City as a regular scoring competitor after competing in the men's road race at the 2022 UCI Road World Championships in Wollongong, Australia. He also represented Vatican City at the 2023 and 2024 editions of the world championships, and the 2024 European Championships, all in the same event.

== Major results ==
2015
N/A Tour de Perth
18th Melbourne-Warrnambool
33rd Tour of Southland
2016
45th New Zealand Cycle Classic
75th Tour de Ijen
65th Tour de Flores
DNF Road race, Dutch National Road Race Championships
N/A Tour of the Great South Coast
N/A Tour of Gippsland
46th Jelajah Malaysia
2017
5th Tour of the Great South Coast
N/A Tour of the King Valley
2018
DNF Herald Sun Tour
DNF Road race, Dutch National Road Race Championships
8th Tour Tahiti Nui
N/A Tour of New Caledonia
2019
11th Tour Tahiti Nui
22nd Tour of New Caledonia
2021
40th Time trial, Dutch National Road Race Championships
2022
11th Limburg Cycling Time Trial
DNF Road race, World Championships
2023
DNF Road race, World Championships
2024
DNF Road race, World Championships
DNF European Road Championships
2026
DNF Road race, 2026 Australian National Road Race Championships
