= 2023 UCI Road World Championships – Men's road race =

Cycling race

Men's road race
2023 UCI Road World Championships

Race details
- Dates: 6 August 2023
- Stages: 1 in Glasgow, Great Britain
- Distance: 271.1 km (168.5 mi)
- Winning time: 6h 07' 27"

Medalists
	Gold	(Netherlands) Mathieu van der Poel (NED)
	Silver	(Belgium) Wout van Aert (BEL)
	Bronze	(Slovenia) Tadej Pogačar (SLO)

The men's road race of the 2023 UCI Road World Championships was a cycling event that took place on 6 August 2023 in Glasgow, Great Britain. Dutch cyclist Mathieu van der Poel won the race after a crash in a high speed corner, racing solo, 16 km before the finish.

== Qualification ==
Qualification was based mainly on the UCI World Ranking by nations as of 30 June 2023.

=== UCI World Rankings ===
The following nations qualified.

Nations	Riders
Australia	8
Belgium	8
Colombia	8
Denmark	8
France	8
Great Britain	8
Italy	8
Netherlands	8
Slovenia	8
Spain	8
Austria	6
Canada	6
Eritrea	6
Germany	6
Ireland	6
New Zealand	6
Norway	6
Portugal	6
Switzerland	6
United States	6
Algeria	4
Czechia	4
Ecuador	4
Estonia	4
Hungary	4
Kazakhstan	4
Latvia	4
Luxembourg	4
Morocco	4
South Africa	4
Neutral athletes of Russian sporting nationality	1
Argentina	1
China	1
Costa Rica	1
Greece	1
Israel	1
Japan	1
Mauritius	1
Mongolia	1
Panama	1
Poland	1
Romania	1
Rwanda	1
Slovakia	1
Sweden	1
Thailand	1
Ukraine	1
Uruguay	1
Uzbekistan	1
Venezuela	1

=== Continental champions ===
Name	Country	Reason
Remco Evenepoel	Belgium	Incumbent World Champion
Henok Mulubrhan	Eritrea	African Champion
Pier-André Côté	Canada	Panamerican Champion
Gleb Brussenskiy	Kazakhstan	Asian Champion

=== Participating nations ===
195 cyclists from 58 nations competed in the event. The number of cyclists per nation is shown in parentheses.

- Anguilla (1)
- Argentina (1)
- Algeria (2)
- Australia (8)
- Austria (6)
- Belgium (9)
- Brazil (1)
- British Virgin Islands (1)
- Canada (6)
- Cape Verde (1)
- Chile (1)
- China (1)
- Colombia (7)
- Costa Rica (1)
- Cyprus (1)
- Czech Republic (4)
- Denmark (8)
- Ecuador (3)
- Eritrea (3)
- France (8)
- Germany (6)
- Great Britain (8)
- Greece (1)
- Guyana (1)
- Hungary (1)
- Ireland (6)
- Israel (1)
- Italy (8)
- Japan (1)
- Kazakhstan (5)
- Latvia (4)
- Luxembourg (4)
- Malta (1)
- Mauritius (1)
- Monaco (1)
- Mongolia (1)
- Morocco (4)
- Netherlands (8)
- New Zealand (5)
- Norway (6)
- Panama (1)
- Poland (1)
- Portugal (4)
- Rwanda (1)
- Saint Vincent and the Grenadines (1)
- Slovakia (2)
- Slovenia (8)
- South Africa (4)
- Spain (8)
- Sweden (1)
- Switzerland (6)
- Uganda (1)
- Ukraine (1)
- United States (6)
- Uruguay (1)
- Uzbekistan (1)
- Vatican City (1)
- Venezuela (1)

== Final classification ==
Rank	Rider	Country	Time
1	Mathieu van der Poel	Netherlands	6h 07' 27"
2	Wout van Aert	Belgium	+ 1' 37"
3	Tadej Pogačar	Slovenia	+ 1' 45"
4	Mads Pedersen	Denmark	+ 1' 45"
5	Stefan Küng	Switzerland	+ 3' 48"
6	Jasper Stuyven	Belgium	+ 3' 48"
7	Matthew Dinham	Australia	+ 3' 48"
8	Toms Skujiņš	Latvia	+ 3' 48"
9	Tiesj Benoot	Belgium	+ 3' 48"
10	Alberto Bettiol	Italy	+ 4' 03"
11	Neilson Powless	United States	+ 4' 20"
12	Dylan van Baarle	Netherlands	+ 4' 24"
13	Mauro Schmid	Switzerland	+ 5' 50"
14	Mattias Skjelmose	Denmark	+ 6' 22"
15	Valentin Madouas	France	+ 7' 53"
16	John Degenkolb	Germany	+ 8' 30"
17	Rasmus Tiller	Norway	+ 8' 30"
18	Owain Doull	Great Britain	+ 8' 30"
19	Alex Aranburu	Spain	+ 8' 30"
20	Kevin Vermaerke	United States	+ 8' 30"
21	Simon Clarke	Australia	+ 8' 30"
22	Patrick Gamper	Austria	+ 8' 30"
23	Krists Neilands	Latvia	+ 8' 55"
24	Petr Kelemen	Czech Republic	+ 10' 01"
25	Remco Evenepoel	Belgium	+ 10' 10"
26	Connor Swift	Great Britain	+ 13' 59"
27	Simone Velasco	Italy	+ 13' 59"
28	Lorenzo Rota	Italy	+ 13' 59"
29	Emīls Liepiņš	Latvia	+ 13' 59"
30	Iván García Cortina	Spain	+ 13' 59"
31	Marco Haller	Austria	+ 13' 59"
32	Lucas Eriksson	Sweden	+ 13' 59"
33	Matevž Govekar	Slovenia	+ 13' 59"
34	Kristian Sbaragli	Italy	+ 13' 59"
35	Michael Gogl	Austria	+ 13' 59"
36	Guillaume Boivin	Canada	+ 13' 59"
37	Michael Boroš	Czech Republic	+ 13' 59"
38	Sebastian Schönberger	Austria	+ 13' 59"
39	Andrea Bagioli	Italy	+ 13' 59"
40	Nickolas Zukowsky	Canada	+ 14' 06"
41	Jonas Rutsch	Germany	+ 14' 06"
42	Adam Ťoupalík	Czech Republic	+ 14' 06"
43	Silvan Dillier	Switzerland	+ 14' 06"
44	Yves Lampaert	Belgium	+ 14' 11"
45	Olav Kooij	Netherlands	+ 14' 11"
46	Nelson Oliveira	Portugal	+ 14' 13"
47	Benoît Cosnefroy	France	+ 14' 13"
48	Ryan Christensen	New Zealand	+ 14' 13"
49	Alexey Lutsenko	Kazakhstan	+ 14' 15"
50	Andreas Leknessund	Norway	+ 14' 18"
51	Tobias Halland Johannessen	Norway	+ 14' 18"

Rank	Rider	Country	Time
	Jhonatan Narváez	Ecuador	DNF
	Nathan Van Hooydonck	Belgium	DNF
	João Almeida	Portugal	DNF
	Lawson Craddock	United States	DNF
	Michael Matthews	Australia	DNF
	Julian Alaphilippe	France	DNF
	Luke Rowe	Great Britain	DNF
	Ion Izagirre	Spain	DNF
	Bryan Coquard	France	DNF
	Rory Townsend	Ireland	DNF
	Santiago Buitrago	Colombia	DNF
	Christophe Laporte	France	DNF
	Matteo Trentin	Italy	DNF
	Lukas Pöstlberger	Austria	DNF
	Jonas Abrahamsen	Norway	DNF
	Victor Campenaerts	Belgium	DNF
	Michel Hessmann	Germany	DNF
	Harold Tejada	Colombia	DNF
	Søren Kragh Andersen	Denmark	DNF
	Marc Hirschi	Switzerland	DNF
	Michał Kwiatkowski	Poland	DNF
	Ben Healy	Ireland	DNF
	Florian Sénéchal	France	DNF
	Mathias Vacek	Czech Republic	DNF
	Jasper Philipsen	Belgium	DNF
	Ruben Guerreiro	Portugal	DNF
	Ryan Gibbons	South Africa	DNF
	Jan Maas	Netherlands	DNF
	Alexander Kristoff	Norway	DNF
	Magnus Cort	Denmark	DNF
	Gonzalo Serrano	Spain	DNF
	Mikkel Frølich Honoré	Denmark	DNF
	André Carvalho	Portugal	DNF
	Roger Adrià	Spain	DNF
	Corbin Strong	New Zealand	DNF
	Kaden Groves	Australia	DNF
	Harry Sweeny	Australia	DNF
	Laurence Pithie	New Zealand	DNF
	Andreas Miltiadis	Cyprus	DNF
	Kevin Geniets	Luxembourg	DNF
	Kasper Asgreen	Denmark	DNF
	Fred Wright	Great Britain	DNF
	Pascal Eenkhoorn	Netherlands	DNF
	Ben Turner	Great Britain	DNF
	Alex Kirsch	Luxembourg	DNF
	Daniel Oss	Italy	DNF
	Olivier Le Gac	France	DNF
	Luka Mezgec	Slovenia	DNF
	Stefan Bissegger	Switzerland	DNS
	Rigoberto Urán	Colombia	DNF
	Ben Swift	Great Britain	DNF
	Peter Sagan	Slovakia	DNF
	Nils Politt	Germany	DNF
	Jake Stewart	Great Britain	DNF
	George Bennett	New Zealand	DNF
	Jaka Primožič	Slovenia	DNF
	Jannik Steimle	Germany	DNF
	Jesús Herrada	Spain	DNF
	Mohcine El Kouraji	Morocco	DNF
	Jonathan Caicedo	Ecuador	DNF
	Edvald Boasson Hagen	Norway	DNF
	James Oram	New Zealand	DNF
	Nico Denz	Germany	DNF
	Daan Hoole	Netherlands	DNF
	Sean Quinn	United States	DNF
	Rainer Kepplinger	Austria	DNF
	Yukiya Arashiro	Japan	DNF
	Márton Dina	Hungary	DNF
	German Tivani	Argentina	DNF
	Jefferson Alexander Cepeda	Ecuador	DNF
	Sainbayaryn Jambaljamts	Mongolia	DNF
	Omar El Gouzi	Morocco	DNF
	Samuel Watson	Great Britain	DNF
	Anatoliy Budyak	Ukraine	DNF
	Derek Gee	Canada	DNF
	Itamar Einhorn	Israel	DNF
	Nicolas Sessler	Brazil	DNF
	Gleb Brussenskiy	Kazakhstan	DNF
	Rémi Cavagna	France	DNF
	Larry Warbasse	United States	DNF
	Georgios Bouglas	Greece	DNF
	Charles Kagimu	Uganda	DNF
	Adil El Arbaoui	Morocco	DNF
	Jason Huertas	Costa Rica	DNF
	Filippo Baroncini	Italy	DNF
	Igor Chzhan	Kazakhstan	DNF
	Matúš Štoček	Slovakia	DNF
	Tom Wirtgen	Luxembourg	DNF
	Charles-Étienne Chrétien	Canada	DNF
	Ben Perry	Canada	DNF
	Dmitriy Gruzdev	Kazakhstan	DNF
	Will Barta	United States	DNF
	Xabier Azparren	Spain	DNF
	Cormac McGeough	Ireland	DNF
	Jesús Ezquerra	Spain	DNF
	Frederik Frison	Belgium	DNF
	El Houcaine Sabbahi	Morocco	DNF
	Muradjan Khalmuratov	Uzbekistan	DNF
	Walter Vargas	Colombia	DNF
	Michael Mørkøv	Denmark	DNF
	Mick van Dijke	Netherlands	DNF
	Hugo Houle	Canada	DNF
	Domen Novak	Slovenia	DNF
	Dillon Corkery	Ireland	DNF
	Ryan Mullen	Ireland	DNF
	Cedric Pries	Luxembourg	DNF
	Oscar Riesebeek	Netherlands	DNF
	Juan Sebastián Molano	Colombia	DNF
	Anže Skok	Slovenia	DNF
	Mārtiņš Pluto	Latvia	DNF
	Alex Edmondson	Australia	DNF
	Fabian Lienhard	Switzerland	DNF
	Daryl Impey	South Africa	DNF
	Kristijan Koren	Slovenia	DNF
	Tilen Finkšt	Slovenia	DNF
	Mikkel Bjerg	Denmark	DNF
	Victor Langellotti	Monaco	DNF
	Eric Manizabayo	Rwanda	DNF
	Luke Plapp	Australia	DNF
	Luke Durbridge	Australia	DNF
	Manuel Lira	Chile	DNF
	Aidan Buttigieg	Malta	DNF
	Su Haoyu	China	DNF
	Fernando Gaviria	Colombia	DNF
	Jesús David Peña	Colombia	DNF
	Sam Bennett	Ireland	DNF
	Dawit Yemane	Eritrea	DNF
	Henok Mulubrhan	Eritrea	DNF
	Natnael Berhane	Eritrea	DNF
	Callum Ormiston	South Africa	DNF
	Morné van Niekerk	South Africa	DNF
	Yacine Hamza	Algeria	DNF
	Youcef Reguigui	Algeria	DNF
	Eric Fagúndez	Uruguay	DNF
	José Alarcón	Venezuela	DNF
	Christopher Rougier-Lagane	Mauritius	DNF
	Darel Christopher	British Virgin Islands	DNF
	Cammie Adams	Saint Vincent and the Grenadines	DNF
	Briton John	Guyana	DNF
	Eliezer Soares	Cape Verde	DNF
	Hasani Hennis	Anguilla	DNF
	Rien Schuurhuis	Vatican City	DNF
	Carlos Samudio	Panama	DNF
	Yevgeniy Fedorov	Kazakhstan	DNS
