= Vatican City women's national football team =

Vatican City
- Association: Vatican Amateur Sports Association
- Head coach: Gianfranco Guadagnoli
- Captain: Eugenie Tcheugoue
- Home stadium: Campo Pio XI, Rome
First colours

First international
- Vatican City 0–10 A.S. Roma (Rome, Italy; 26 May 2019)

The Vatican City women's national football team is the team that represents Vatican City in association football and is under the control of the Vatican Amateur Sports Association, headquartered in the Vatican's Cortile di San Damaso. Gianfranco Guadagnoli, an Italian, is the current head coach, in addition to being the coach of the men's national team. Susan Volpini is the current manager.

== History ==
At Vatican Family Day in June 2018, a group of women organized to play football against each other as the male employees had done for years. Soon after they competed in a tournament organized by the Bambino Gesù Hospital.

The national representative team was first formed in 2019 and played its first match on 26 May of that year. The team took on A.S. Roma of the women's Serie A, the highest level of women's football in Italy. The Vatican side lost 0–10 at the Campo Pio XI.

On 7 June 2019, the team played their first "away" match, traveling across Rome to face the women's team of Serie D club A.S.D. Trastevere Calcio. Despite the 1–3 defeat, the Vatican City team earned a penalty kick which was converted for the team's first-ever goal.

After several months of preparation and planning, the team traveled to Austria to face Wiener Landesliga (women's third division) side FC Mariahilf at a stadium in Simmering in Vienna on 22 June 2019 as part of the club's twentieth anniversary. However, the match was cancelled after several FCM players displayed pro-choice messages written on their skin under their jerseys during the playing of Vatican City's national anthem.

=== Players ===
As of 2018, there are approximately 800 female employees of Vatican City. The squad consists of female Vatican employees and wives and daughters of Vatican employees. In 2019, about 20 to 25 women between the ages of 25 and 50 comprised the squad. There were only lay workers and no nuns on the squad, although nuns are welcome to play. Although most team members are merely amateur players, some, such as Cameroonian captain Eugenie Tcheugoue, have played at higher levels.

== Team image ==
As of 2019, the team wears an all yellow Givova top with the Sport Association logo in the center of the chest. The Vatican City women's national football team plays their home matches on the Campo Pio XI.

== Results and fixtures ==
The following is a list of match results in the last 12 months, as well as any future matches that have been scheduled.

Legend

Win Draw Lose Void or postponed Fixture

=== 2019 ===
26 May Unofficial friendly	Vatican City	0–10	(Italy) A.S. Roma Primavera	Rome, Italy
				Stadium: Campo Pio XI

7 June Unofficial friendly	A.S.D. Trastevere Calcio (Italy)	3–1	Vatican City	Rome, Italy
				Stadium: Vittorio Bachelet Stadium

=== 2023 ===
June Vatican Cup	Vatican City	1–3	(Germany) KSV Johannisthal	Rome, Italy
		Report		Stadium: Campo Pio XI

=== 2024 ===
12 October Vatican Cup	KSV Johannisthal (Germany)	3–1	Vatican City	Berlin, Germany
		Report		Stadium: Käthe Tucholla Stadium

== Notable players ==
- Eugenie Tcheugoue - captain

== See also ==
- Sport in Vatican City
- Vatican City men's national football team
- Campionato della Città del Vaticano
- List of football clubs in Vatican City
- Index of Vatican City-related articles
