= Susan Volpini =

American and Vatican football manager (born 1968)

- Born: 1968 (age 57–58); United States
- Citizenship: Vatican City
- Occupation: Football manager
- Years active: 2019–present
- Known for: Creating the Vatican City women's national football team

Susan Volpini (born c. 1968) is an American and Vatican woman known for creating and managing the Vatican City women's national football team. She also helped establish the first women's organisation within the Vatican City.

== Biography ==
Volpini was born in the United States. She has three children.

Volpini moved to the Vatican City to work for the Pontifical Council Cor Unum and later for the Secretariat for the Economy, which oversees the Vatican's economic activities. She also serves as events organiser for the Vatican Amateur Sports Association, the Vatican's national Olympic committee.

In 2016, she was among the co-founders of the Women in the Vatican Association (Italian: Donne in Vaticano), known colloquially as the Divas, which was the first woman's organisation founded within the Vatican. The organisation aims to empower and support laywomen, consecrated women and religious sisters who work within, or had previously worked, in the Vatican, and make women more visible. Volpini herself has spoken about the need to support women working in the Vatican who are mothers; she has also called on the Catholic Church to support mothers around the world who struggle to feed their children. Volpini served as the organisation's first secretary, though was no longer in the position as of 2025.

In May 2019, it was announced that Pope Francis had authorised the establishment of a women's football team in the Vatican, 48 years after the creation of its men's team. The team was devised by Volpini and the Vatican's sports director, Danilo Zennari, and was spiritually supported by Federico Lombardi and Luigi Mistò. Volpini described the purpose of the team as to "create bonds and friendships"; its players are all lay workers from the Vatican, as well as male employees' wives and daughters. Membership is open to nuns. Following its official announcement, Volpini was appointed the team's manager.

The team's first game, a friendly match against AS Roma, ended with the team losing the match 10-0. Volpini described the team as not being focused on winning but instead having a good time and building relationships.
