= Roma Capannelle Cricket Club =

Personnel
- Captain: Leandro Jayarajah
- Coach: Dane Kirby
- Owner: Francis Alphonsus Jayarajah

Team information
- Colors: Black & Green
- Founded: 1978
- Home ground: Roma Capannelle Cricket Ground, Rome

History
- Serie A Cricket wins: 5 (1988-90-91, 2000, 2013)
- Italian Cup wins: 1986-96 (ten years straight)
- European Winners’ Cup wins: 2nd place - 1992 in France
- Women Serie A wins: 2 (2009-10)
- U19, U17, U15, U13 wins: U19 (2005), U17 (2004 & 2009), U15 (2002-3, 2008, 2018) U13 (1999, 2001, 2005, 2007, 2017-18)
- Official website: Official website

Roma Capannelle Cricket Club is a Serie A cricket team founded in 1978 in Rome. It is one of the most successful teams in Italy, as well as being one of the oldest (with continuous activity) and with the most years of militancy in Serie A Cricket. With four Serie A titles, ten Italian Cups, five Italian Trophies, and one Championship Six a side for the first team are joined by two women's Serie A titles and the youth Champions of Italy titles: five times Under 13, four Under 13, two Under 17 and one Under 19.

== History ==
In the 1960s in Rome, numerous cricket teams made up of officials from FAO, from the embassies of the United Kingdom, Australia and India, and from pupils and teachers from English schools and colleges gave life to a tournament called Rome Ashes. The matches took place in the Villa Doria Pamphilj, made available by Princess Orietta who had married an English nobleman. Subsequently, following the expropriation of the villa by the Municipality of Rome, cricket began to disappear. At this point, in 1978, the Doria Pamphili Cricket Club, today's Roma Capannelle Cricket Club, was founded by Francis Alphonsus Jayarajah together with Massimo Brian Da Costa, Desmon O'Grady and Sam Kahale in Rome.

At the end of the same year the Italian Cricket Association (today the Italian Cricket Federation) was founded in Rome and the first regional championship took place, won by the Doria Pamphili Cricket Club. In March 1997 the Italian national team played the World Cup II group in Malaysia and among those called up there were five Capannelle athletes (Amati, Da Costa, Maggio, Rajapakse, while FA Jayarajah was also present as AIC delegate for international contacts).

Roma Capannelle C.C. since 1983, thanks to the availability of the Hippodrome, it has the best pitch in Italy. Many of his players have played in the Italian national team confirming the policy implemented for years by Roma Capannelle C.C. which brings young Italians who are discovering this game closer to foreigners residing in Rome. Its captain Francis Alphonsus Jayarajah spread, together with Simone Gambino, former president of the Italian Cricket Federation, this sport in Italy and was the first captain of the Italian national team.

In 1988 the R.C.C.C. has seen all four competitions organized by the Italian Cricket Federation, and eight of its players have been selected to play for the national team. He has participated in international tournaments in Spain (in the Costa del Sol), in Paris, in London, in two editions of the European Club Cricket Festival in Durham in which teams from Norway, Sweden, Luxembourg, France, Denmark, Switzerland took part. and Germany finishing second. In England, he faced off against the Ascot racecourse team, resulting in a derby between famous racecourses. She also participated, as winner of the 1991 Scudetto, in the Champions Cup in Paris, where, albeit with a reduced line-up due to five holders absent for university exams, she came second.

In October 1996 she was invited to participate in the tournament for the 20th anniversary of the FEAX C.C. in Corfu (Greece) with good results. The club's overseas tours are still organized during the summer months, especially visiting England and the city of London against which, after more than three decades, real rivalries have been created against historic London clubs that come to Rome to challenge the Roman club again.

The Roma Capannelle Cricket Club in the following years won the Italian Championship five times (1988-90-91-2000-2013) and finished second nine times. Eight times, however, he won the Italian Cup. He was also the winner of numerous tournaments reserved for Italian and young players such as the Italy Trophy (5 out of 7) and the six-a-side Italian Championship to which are added the twelve titles of Italian Champions for Under 13, U15, U17 and U19. In recent years, thanks to the numerous projects to develop and promote Cricket in schools, the club has brought forward the women's section, which won its first two national titles in 2010 and 2011 and has produced dozens of cricket athletes born in Italy.

On July 28, 2013, beating the Kingsgrove Milano, the Roma Capannelle Cricket Club becomes champion of Italy for the 5th time in its history.

In recent years, Roma Capannelle, the only team in the capital to serve in Serie A, is applying a "rejuvenation" that sees in the starting line-up the use of some of the most interesting players in Italian cricket, including Leandro Jayarajah, Michele Morettini, Kevin Kekulawala, Anisur Rahman, Emi Ghulam and Giorgio Scalco together with the younger Maruf Anowar, Ion Racila and Zaryan Ijaz.

At the same time the club, in addition to the various youth sections, and the women's team has increased the senior activity, with the addition of the 2nd XI, that is the second team, which includes players with less experience, young and old and marginal players. of the Serie A team. In addition, for the first time in Italy, a formation of Veterans was founded, namely the XL XI, the Over 40 team, mainly in challenges against foreign clubs visiting Rome.

The recent tricolor successes of Roma Capannelle CC in the youth sector with two consecutive Under 13 titles and one in the Under 15 confirm that the youth and cricket promotion projects in schools and in the territory that continue to be organized by the Club give own fruits so much that in 2019 the Club opened a new youth sector for the very young: Little Cricket Under 7 - introduction to sport through Cricket.

== Current Squad (Players) ==
1ST XI Players
| S/N | Name | Nat. | Date of birth (age) | Batting style | Bowling style | Note |
Batsmen
| 28 | Leandro Jayarajah | (Italy) | May 28, 1987 (age 33) | Right-handed | Right-arm off spin | Captain |
| 7 | Maruf Anowar | (Bangladesh) | October 25, 2004 (age 18) | Right-handed | Right-arm fast | |
| 4 | Dane Kirby | (Australia) | February 25, 1972 (age 49) | Right-handed | Right-arm medium | |
| 17 | Sumair Ali | (Pakistan) | March 15, 1994 (age 27) | Right-handed | Right-arm fast | |
| 27 | Usman Raja | (Pakistan) | November 3, 1987 (age 33) | Right-handed | Right-arm leg-break | |
| 8 | Ali Ghulam | (Pakistan) | September 8, 1989 (age 31) | Right-handed | Right-arm off-spin | |
| 22 | Ijaz Ahammed | (Pakistan) | December 19, 1970 (age 50) | Right-handed | Right-arm spin | |
All-rounders
| 69 | Kevin Kekulawala | (Italy) | October 28, 1996 (age 24) | Right-handed | Right-arm leg-break | |
| 16 | Emi Ghulam | (Italy) | September 18, 1994 (age 26) | Right-handed | Right-arm fast-medium | |
| 98 | Anisur Rahman | (Italy) | November 18, 1999 (age 26) | Right-handed | Right-arm off-break | |
| 10 | Zaryan Ijaz | (Pakistan) | January 8, 2004 (age 17) | Right-handed | Right-arm fast-medium | |
| 9 | Suresh Anton | (Sri Lanka) | March 15, 1972 (age 49) | Right-handed | Right-arm spin | |
Wicket-keepers
| 46 | Ion Racila | (Moldova) | June 15, 2001 (age 19) | Right-handed | — | |
Bowlers
| 58 | Michele Morettini | (Italy) | December 25, 1991 (age 29) | Right-handed | Right-arm fast | |
| 169 | Safi Badar | (Afghanistan) | February 16, 1992 (age 29) | Right-handed | Slow arm fast | |
| 21 | Vikram Sharda | (India) | 15 December 1985 (age 35) | Right-handed | Right-arm medium fast | |
| 11 | Kiran Ginkal | (India) | May 16, 1994 (age 26) | Right-handed | Right-arm off break | |
| 12 | Ragesh Ramakrishnan | (India) | May 28, 1997 (age 23) | Right-handed | Right-arm fast-medium | |
