= Chiara Porro =

Australian diplomat

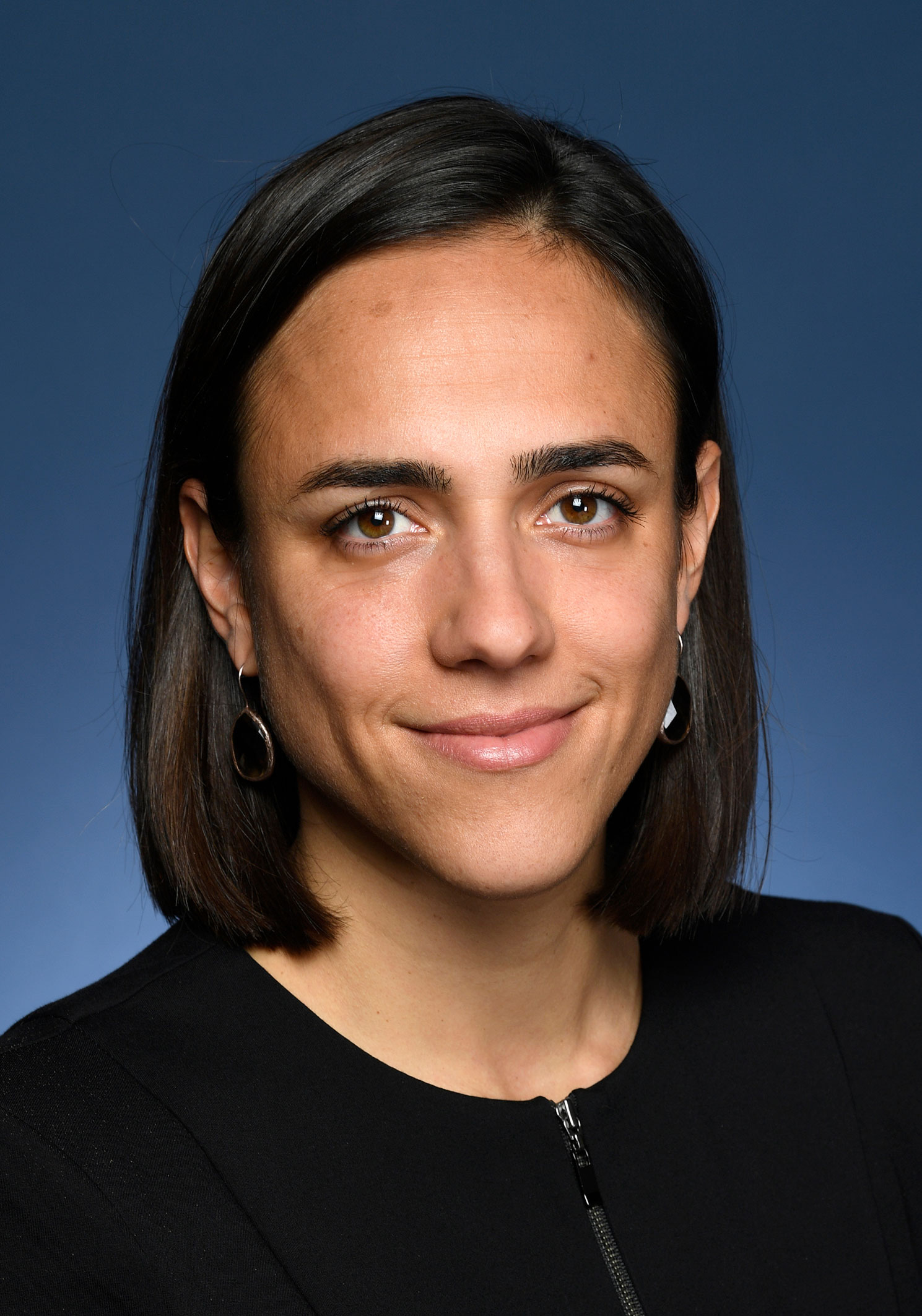

Australian Ambassador to the Holy See
- In office September 2020 – 29 November 2024
- Preceded by: Melissa Hitchman
- Succeeded by: Keith Pitt

Personal details
- Born: 30 July 1984 (age 42) Milan, Italy
- Spouse: Rien Schuurhuis
- Education: University of York, Leiden University
- Occupation: Diplomat

Chiara Porro (born 30 July 1984) is an Australian diplomat who served as Ambassador to The Holy See.

Porro was born in Milan but left Italy at age three. She graduated from the University of York, England with a Bachelor of Arts in politics, philosophy and economics. She subsequently completed an Advanced Master of Science in International Relations and Diplomacy (MIRD) from Leiden University, Netherlands.

Porro worked in the Department of Prime Minister and Cabinet, before moving to the Department of Foreign Affairs and Trade, where her service has included time in India and New Caledonia.

Porro is married to cyclist Rien Schuurhuis. Schuurhuis competed internationally for Vatican City after gaining citizenship during his wife's appointment, becoming the first scoring athlete to represent the Vatican in international competition. They have two children, Thomas and George.

Diplomatic posts
Preceded by Melissa Hitchman	Australian Ambassador to the Holy See; 2020–2024	Succeeded by Keith Pitt
