= 2026 World Poomsae Championships =

Chuncheon 2026 World Taekwondo Poomsae Championships
- Venue: Chuncheon Air Dome
- Location: (South Korea) Korea
- Dates: 16 – 20 September 2026
- Competitors: 1,417 from 85 nations

The 2026 World Taekwondo Poomsae Championships, the 15th edition of the World Taekwondo Poomsae Championships, were held in Chuncheon at the Chuncheon Air Dome from September 16 to September 20, 2026. The tournament was classified as a G-8 event within the World Taekwondo ranking system and featured competitions in both traditional Poomsae as well as freestyle poomsae.

The event was organized by World Taekwondo in cooperation with the "Chuncheon Leisure & Taekwondo Organizing Committee". The World Poomsae Championships were hosted in Chuncheon for the first time.

== Medal table ==
* Host nation (South Korea)

Rank	Nation	Gold	Silver	Bronze	Total
1	South Korea*	20	4	5	29
2	Thailand	3	3	3	9
3	United States	2	5	10	17
4	Chinese Taipei	2	4	10	16
5	China	2	4	1	7
6	Vietnam	2	1	4	7
7	Germany	2	1	1	4
8	Spain	1	2	3	6
9	Australia	1	2	0	3
10	Mexico	1	1	5	7
11	France	1	1	2	4
12	Great Britain	1	1	1	3
13	Mongolia	1	1	0	2
14	Turkey	1	0	2	3
15	Brazil	1	0	1	2
16	Norway	1	0	0	1
17	Iran	0	3	3	6
18	Denmark	0	3	2	5
19	Austria	0	2	2	4
20	Philippines	0	1	7	8
21	Malaysia	0	1	2	3
22	Indonesia	0	1	0	1
22	Japan	0	1	0	1
24	Hong Kong	0	0	8	8
25	Canada	0	0	5	5
26	Russia	0	0	2	2
27	Italy	0	0	1	1
27	Netherlands	0	0	1	1
27	Peru	0	0	1	1
27	Portugal	0	0	1	1
27	Singapore	0	0	1	1
Totals (31 entries)		42	42	84	168

== Medal summary ==
=== Recognized Poomsae ===
==== Men ====
Event	Gold	Silver	Bronze
Individual Cadets	Kim Taeyoung; South Korea	Shine-Erdene Tserendejid; Mongolia	Dayrius Ding Heng Low; Singapore
Individual Cadets	Kim Taeyoung; South Korea	Shine-Erdene Tserendejid; Mongolia	Alan Dae Yon Kim Lee; Mexico
Individual Juniors	Hsieh Min-Yu; Chinese Taipei	Behdad Naghiee; Iran	Ong Whye Jing; United States
Individual Juniors	Hsieh Min-Yu; Chinese Taipei	Behdad Naghiee; Iran	Caleb Angel Calde; Philippines
Individual under 30	Dongjun Lee; South Korea	Navin Pinthasute; Thailand	Joël van der Weide; Netherlands
Individual under 30	Dongjun Lee; South Korea	Navin Pinthasute; Thailand	Sung Hyun Eric Gun; United States
Individual under 40	Zhu Yuxiang; China	Banjamin Harder; Denmark	Chew Wei Yan; Malaysia
Individual under 40	Zhu Yuxiang; China	Banjamin Harder; Denmark	Choi Hyoseok; South Korea
Individual under 50	Minki Seong; United States	Li Chung Wang; Chinese Taipei	Reza Rabiei; Canada
Individual under 50	Minki Seong; United States	Li Chung Wang; Chinese Taipei	Hak Dong Kim; South Korea
Individual under 60	Kim Min-Sang; South Korea	Simon Negus; Great Britain	Michail Rodin; Russia
Individual under 60	Kim Min-Sang; South Korea	Simon Negus; Great Britain	June Ninobla; Philippines
Individual under 65	Raimundo Renato; Brazil	Hakgyu Kim; South Korea	Ky-Tu Dang; Denmark
Individual under 65	Raimundo Renato; Brazil	Hakgyu Kim; South Korea	Mustafa Yilmaz; Turkey
Individual over 65	Ali Pourtaheri; Great Britain	Jorn Andersen; Denmark	Byoungyoun Lim; South Korea
Individual over 65	Ali Pourtaheri; Great Britain	Jorn Andersen; Denmark	Michel Carron; France

==== Women ====
Event	Gold	Silver	Bronze
Individual Cadets	Gahui Seol; South Korea	Ella Kim; Australia	Joniya Yua Ysabelle Obiacoro; Philippines
Individual Cadets	Gahui Seol; South Korea	Ella Kim; Australia	Yu Shan Chang; Chinese Taipei
Individual Juniors	Jihye Park; South Korea	Yuqi Li; China	Ka Ching Ng; Hong Kong
Individual Juniors	Jihye Park; South Korea	Yuqi Li; China	Elenielle Ong; United States
Individual under 30	Lee Jooyeong; South Korea	Mahsa Barzegari; Iran	Eva Sandersen; Denmark
Individual under 30	Lee Jooyeong; South Korea	Mahsa Barzegari; Iran	Ratchadawan Tapaenthong; Thailand
Individual under 40	Ting-Jung Chang; Chinese Taipei	Tuyet van Chau; Vietnam	Lai Lee Kong; Hong Kong
Individual under 40	Ting-Jung Chang; Chinese Taipei	Tuyet van Chau; Vietnam	Thanh-Van Huynh; United States
Individual under 50	Anna Kim; Norway	Ester Salimun; Malaysia	Tina Herrmann; Germany
Individual under 50	Anna Kim; Norway	Ester Salimun; Malaysia	Eunju Kim; South Korea
Individual under 60	Yeon-Bu Kim; South Korea	Soo Mi Lee Jo; Spain	Marina Garcia Belaunde Velarde; Peru
Individual under 60	Yeon-Bu Kim; South Korea	Soo Mi Lee Jo; Spain	Tatiana Parfenenko; Russia
Individual under 65	Heekyung Reimann; Germany	Carmela Hartnett; Australia	Sabine Muller; Austria
Individual under 65	Heekyung Reimann; Germany	Carmela Hartnett; Australia	Beatriz Queiro Campos; Spain
Individual over 65	Mireille Aunac; France	Leni Niedermayr; Austria	Julie Tregeagle; United States
Individual over 65	Mireille Aunac; France	Leni Niedermayr; Austria	Eduarda Ferraz; Portugal

==== Pairs ====
Event	Gold	Silver	Bronze
Pair Cadet	Mongolia; Enkh-Erdene Otgonbayar; Shine-Erdene Tserendejid	Thailand; Thasang Kelddang; Jiranut Benzipa	United States; Olivia Oriordan; Kayden Ha
Pair Cadet	Mongolia; Enkh-Erdene Otgonbayar; Shine-Erdene Tserendejid	Thailand; Thasang Kelddang; Jiranut Benzipa	Chinese Taipei; Yi-Ting Chu; Hsuan-Chih Hsueh
Pair Juniors	Thailand; Punnawit Hongyisipaet; Suchanan Injang	Japan; Zen Shiosaki; Hinako Sato	Hong Kong; Law Tsz Ching; Wong Cheuk Yin
Pair Juniors	Thailand; Punnawit Hongyisipaet; Suchanan Injang	Japan; Zen Shiosaki; Hinako Sato	Vietnam; Ie Hoang Yen; Ie Bao Anh
Pair under 30	Thailand; Thana Kiewlailerd; Chutikam Lapnitayapan	Indonesia; Rizal Muhammad; Komara Kinara Abbabiel L.	Iran; Amirali Alizadeh; Razieh Aghaei
Pair under 30	Thailand; Thana Kiewlailerd; Chutikam Lapnitayapan	Indonesia; Rizal Muhammad; Komara Kinara Abbabiel L.	Turkey; Seyda Nur Yavuz; Furkan Bayrak
Pair under 50	Vietnam; Thien Phung Nguyen; Thi le Kim Nguyen	Denmark; Charlotte Pedersen; Benjamin Harder	Iran; Mahdi Jamali Fashi; Mahdiyeh Oghbaei
Pair under 50	Vietnam; Thien Phung Nguyen; Thi le Kim Nguyen	Denmark; Charlotte Pedersen; Benjamin Harder	Malaysia; Cheong Pui Kei; Chew Wei Yan
Pair under 60	United States; Thoa Nguyen; Sungwoo Ha	France; Celine Hery; Farid Begag	Brazil; Catia Esteves; Marcelo Alves
Pair under 60	United States; Thoa Nguyen; Sungwoo Ha	France; Celine Hery; Farid Begag	Hong Kong; Chi Kuen Kwok; Yin Hing Yang
Pair over 60	Germany; Heekyung Reimann; Werner Unland	Spain; Jose Manuel Marin Fernandez; Beatriz Queiro Campos	Canada; Lee Seung Keun; Belinda Co
Pair over 60	Germany; Heekyung Reimann; Werner Unland	Spain; Jose Manuel Marin Fernandez; Beatriz Queiro Campos	Austria; Sylvia Gringer; Gerhard Reinsperger

==== Team ====
Event	Gold	Silver	Bronze
Team Male Cadet	South Korea; Yeo Jinwoo; Im Hyeonjong; Kang Yul	United States; David Kim; Jaden Choi; Gabriel Jomalesa	Chinese Taipei; Huang Kai-Chen; Chi Rui-Xun; Wang Bo-Jyun
Team Male Cadet	South Korea; Yeo Jinwoo; Im Hyeonjong; Kang Yul	United States; David Kim; Jaden Choi; Gabriel Jomalesa	Mexico; Abraham Sanchez Diaz; Sergio Osvaldo Garcia Ornelas; Alan Galvan Escontrillas
Team Female Cadet	South Korea; Lee Joy; Song Song Seoyun; Choi Dahyeon	United States; Dina Dorack; Arianna Lee; Kori Tsang	Chinese Taipei; Tsai Ya-Shin; Tsung Yu-Yun; Tsai Wei-En
Team Female Cadet	South Korea; Lee Joy; Song Song Seoyun; Choi Dahyeon	United States; Dina Dorack; Arianna Lee; Kori Tsang	Hong Kong; Leung Sum; Liu Sum Yu; Wong Yat Tung
Team Male Junior	South Korea; Cho Jinsung; Lee Sa-Bin; Lee Gunhyung	United States; Ong Whye Jing; David Gil; Preston Park	Chinese Taipei; Shih Cho-Yeh; Yang Chen-An; Chen Yu-En
Team Male Junior	South Korea; Cho Jinsung; Lee Sa-Bin; Lee Gunhyung	United States; Ong Whye Jing; David Gil; Preston Park	Hong Kong; Hung Tsz Ho; Wong Cheuk Yin; Choi Po Hang
Team Female Junior	South Korea; Kim Yu-Na; Kim Dohee; Kim Yee-Un	Chinese Taipei; Teng Yun-Jou; Chou Jou-Chun; Lin Chieh-En	Hong Kong; Cheuk Tsz Ying; Law Tsz Ching; Cheung Lok Ching
Team Female Junior	South Korea; Kim Yu-Na; Kim Dohee; Kim Yee-Un	Chinese Taipei; Teng Yun-Jou; Chou Jou-Chun; Lin Chieh-En	Vietnam; Ie Hoang Yen; Vo Thi Hyunh Nhu; Huynh Thi Hoang Quyen
Team Male under 30	South Korea; Oh Min Hyeok; Park Hangyeol; Kim Tae-Woo	Chinese Taipei; Wang Syu-Ming; Wang Syu-Fan; Li Ping-Han	Philippines; Patrick King Perez; Ian Matthew Corton; Joaquin Dominic Tuzon
Team Male under 30	South Korea; Oh Min Hyeok; Park Hangyeol; Kim Tae-Woo	Chinese Taipei; Wang Syu-Ming; Wang Syu-Fan; Li Ping-Han	Malaysia; Chin Ken Haw; Augustine Linggi Randy Owen A. Yeap Zhi Bin
Team Female under 30	South Korea; Yubin Shin; Seung-Min Yoo; Chae Won Seo	Iran; Mahsa Barzegari; Dina Yaghoubi; Razieh Aghaei	Philippines; Sofia Ysabelle Sarmiento; Julianna Martha Uy; Mana Nicole Labayne
Team Female under 30	South Korea; Yubin Shin; Seung-Min Yoo; Chae Won Seo	Iran; Mahsa Barzegari; Dina Yaghoubi; Razieh Aghaei	Vietnam; Tran Kim Uyen Ie; Ngoc Han Ie; Thi Kim Ha Nguyen
Team Male under 50	South Korea; Ji Ho-Yong; Park Kwang-Ho; Shin Woo Young	Chinese Taipei; Chang Wei Chieh; Tsai Tien-Cheng; Chuang Chun Kai	France; Alexis Mehrmann; Fabien Babault; Selgi Leblanc
Team Male under 50	South Korea; Ji Ho-Yong; Park Kwang-Ho; Shin Woo Young	Chinese Taipei; Chang Wei Chieh; Tsai Tien-Cheng; Chuang Chun Kai	Vietnam; Nguyen van Truong; Le Thanh Trung; Nguyen Thien Phung
Team Female under 50	Vietnam; Lien Thi Tuyet Mai; Chau Tuyet van Nguyen Thi le Kim	Germany; Stephanie Elbers; Francesca Dincao; Amelie Bruening	South Korea; Kim Hanbyeol; Cho Dahye; Kim Jinam
Team Female under 50	Vietnam; Lien Thi Tuyet Mai; Chau Tuyet van Nguyen Thi le Kim	Germany; Stephanie Elbers; Francesca Dincao; Amelie Bruening	Spain; Ainhoa Delgado Ruiz; Esperanza Diaz Martin; Andrea Marono Blandez
Team Male under 60	Spain; Antonio Moreno Rodriguez; Jose Maria Prieto Estrada; Joaquin Heredia Pino	South Korea; Kwon Ki Yeong; Kim Sung Hoi; Lee Cheol Hee	Chinese Taipei; Lin Pei-Lin; Yu Hung-Chun; Lin Ho Pin
Team Male under 60	Spain; Antonio Moreno Rodriguez; Jose Maria Prieto Estrada; Joaquin Heredia Pino	South Korea; Kwon Ki Yeong; Kim Sung Hoi; Lee Cheol Hee	United States; Yang Pok Sun; Sungwoo Ha; Giseon Kim
Team Female under 60	South Korea; Kim Minhwa; Kim Miseon; Kim Eunjoo	United States; Elva Adams; Cindy Sin Sook Um; Thoa Nguyen	Hong Kong; Theresa Tse Ka Man; Shirley Lo Yuen Han; Yang Yin Hing
Team Female under 60	South Korea; Kim Minhwa; Kim Miseon; Kim Eunjoo	United States; Elva Adams; Cindy Sin Sook Um; Thoa Nguyen	Spain; Maria Montserrat Sanchez; Isabel Gomez Mendez; Beatriz Castellanos Abraldes
Team Male over 60	Turkey; Teyfik Celik; Mehmet Orkan; Mustafa Yilmaz	South Korea; Son Yongok; Woo Ha Seong; Kim Hee-Do	Mexico; Jorge Alberto Morales; Roberto Lopez Lopez; Jose Gonzalez Utrera
Team Male over 60	Turkey; Teyfik Celik; Mehmet Orkan; Mustafa Yilmaz	South Korea; Son Yongok; Woo Ha Seong; Kim Hee-Do	Chinese Taipei; Lee Jung Chieh; Yeh Chin-Shun; Su Hsiao-Yao
Team Female over 60	Australia; Pat Petrovski; Karen Doyle; Carmela Hartnett	Austria; Sylvia Gringer; Sabine Muller; Leni Niedermayr	United Kingdom; Pina Petrillo; Jenny Furness; Virginia Brown
Team Female over 60	Australia; Pat Petrovski; Karen Doyle; Carmela Hartnett	Austria; Sylvia Gringer; Sabine Muller; Leni Niedermayr	United States; Anacleta Thorne; Kirsten Tolstrup; Thu Doolittle

=== Freestyle Poomsae ===
==== Men ====
Event	Gold	Silver	Bronze
Individual Male under 17	Jaeyoung Byeon; South Korea	Morena Gomez; Mexico	Punnathorn Sirisom; Thailand
Individual Male under 17	Jaeyoung Byeon; South Korea	Morena Gomez; Mexico	Chiu-Yang Chao; Chinese Taipei
Individual Male over 17	Jang Untae; South Korea	Darius Venerable; Philippines	Chang kai-Hsin; Canada
Individual Male over 17	Jang Untae; South Korea	Darius Venerable; Philippines	Wang Yuxin; China

==== Women ====
Event	Gold	Silver	Bronze
Individual Female under 17	Kim Tae Lee; South Korea	Lei Yimeng; China	Hsu Hsiang-Chu; Chinese Taipei
Individual Female under 17	Kim Tae Lee; South Korea	Lei Yimeng; China	Natnaree Kumsa-Ad; Thailand
Individual Female over 17	Jang Han-Sol; South Korea	Lin Sitong; China	Arlotti Valentina; Italy
Individual Female over 17	Jang Han-Sol; South Korea	Lin Sitong; China	Rachel Lee; Canada

==== Pairs ====
Event	Gold	Silver	Bronze
Pair under 17	South Korea; Lee Haesung; Shin Bia	China; Lei Yimeng; Huang Xinyu	Mexico; Miguel Angel Moreno Gomez; Seo Yoon Sofia Lee Kim
Pair under 17	South Korea; Lee Haesung; Shin Bia	China; Lei Yimeng; Huang Xinyu	United States; Aeriana Her; Higan Her
Pair over 17	China; Zhang Tao; Lin Sitong	South Korea; Kim Jihyun; Lee Jin-Ho	Canada; Chang Kai-Hsin; Rachel Lee
Pair over 17	China; Zhang Tao; Lin Sitong	South Korea; Kim Jihyun; Lee Jin-Ho	Iran; Yasin Akbari; Hananeh Ahmadi Ebrahimi

==== Mixed Teams ====
Event	Gold	Silver	Bronze
Mixed Team under 17	Thailand; Pongsakorn Thongdee; Manan Tongbanbor; Punnathorn Sirisom; Natnaree Kumsa-Ad; Peerasak Sansanit; Rinrada Numthongthai	United States; Angela Pham; Jayden Kim; Logan Silbaugh; Cody Tu; Ella Trinh	Philippines; Marielle Elaine Montecillo; Reijes McHeil Landicho; Ashton Martin Losaria; Rhianne Jane Macabales; Aeden Roffer Cereno
Mixed Team under 17	Thailand; Pongsakorn Thongdee; Manan Tongbanbor; Punnathorn Sirisom; Natnaree Kumsa-Ad; Peerasak Sansanit; Rinrada Numthongthai	United States; Angela Pham; Jayden Kim; Logan Silbaugh; Cody Tu; Ella Trinh	Chinese Taipei; Kao Tzu-Chun; Ku Wei-Ting; Chu Yi-Ting; Yeh Bing-Hsuan; Wang Yi-Han; Huang Liang-Yu
Mixed Team over 17	Mexico; Cecilia Lee; Josue Galindo; Eder Jezrael Cantero Moreno; Daniel Garcia; Luis Alfonso de la Mora Lopez; Dayra Mariana Comparan Luna	Thailand; Chonlakorn Chayawatto; Ratchaphol Yaibua; Atchariya Koedkaew; Suwapis Sirisinrungraung; Thitaree Kaewolanwasu; Sasipha Chuphon	United States; Caden Okamoto; Allison Deguzman; Gian Legaspi; Hailey Kolbach; Justin Catiggay; Julian Gamez
Mixed Team over 17	Mexico; Cecilia Lee; Josue Galindo; Eder Jezrael Cantero Moreno; Daniel Garcia; Luis Alfonso de la Mora Lopez; Dayra Mariana Comparan Luna	Thailand; Chonlakorn Chayawatto; Ratchaphol Yaibua; Atchariya Koedkaew; Suwapis Sirisinrungraung; Thitaree Kaewolanwasu; Sasipha Chuphon	Philippines; Janna Dominique Oliva; Zyka Angelica Santiago; Jeus Gabriel Derick Yape; Justin Kobe Macario; Jay-Ar Casas; Darlus Venerable

== See also ==
- 2023 European Poomsae Championships
- 2024 World Poomsae Championships
- 2025 European Poomsae Championships
- 2026 European Taekwondo Championships
