= Italian Taekwondo Federation =

Governing body for Taekwondo in Italy

Italian Taekwondo Federation Federazione Italiana Taekwondo
- Sport: Taekwondo
- Jurisdiction: Italy
- Abbreviation: FITA
- Affiliation: World Taekwondo; Italian National Olympic Committee

Official website
- www.taekwondoitalia.it
- (Italy)

The Italian Taekwondo Federation (Italian: Federazione Italiana Taekwondo or FITA) is the national sports governing body for taekwondo in Italy. It is a member of the Italian National Olympic Committee.

== International competition ==
The Italian Taekwondo Federation is a member of the European umbrella organization European Taekwondo Union as well as the World Association for World Taekwondo (WT).

On the part of the Italy Olympic Committee, the Italian Taekwondo Federation is the only Taekwondo Association authorized to send athletes to the Olympic Games. Carlo Molfetta became the first Italian gold medalist in Taekwondo.
