= 2022 UCI Road World Championships – Men's road race =

Cycling race

Men's road race
2022 UCI Road World Championships
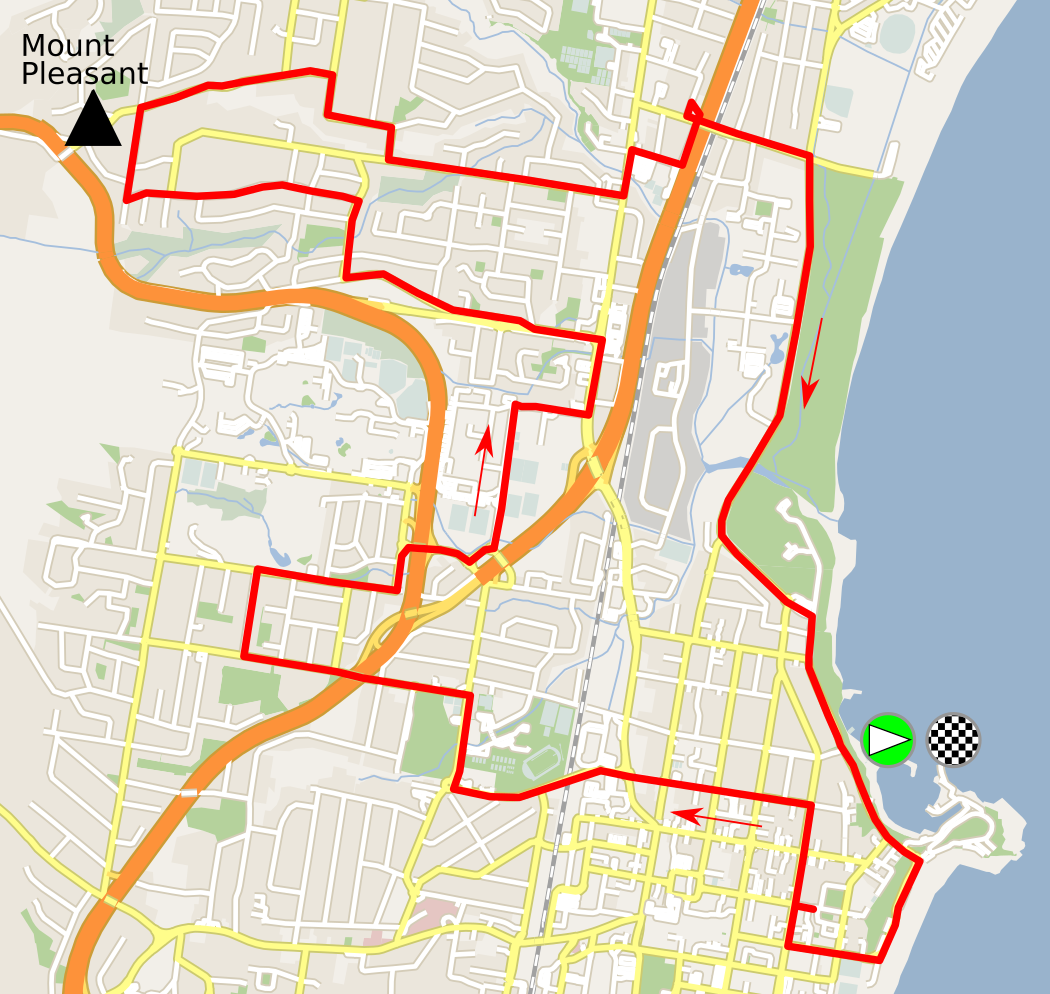

Race details
- Dates: 25 September 2022
- Stages: 1 in Wollongong, Australia
- Distance: 266.9 km (165.8 mi)
- Winning time: 6h 16' 08"

Medalists
| | Gold | (Belgium) Remco Evenepoel (BEL) |
| | Silver | (France) Christophe Laporte (FRA) |
| | Bronze | (Australia) Michael Matthews (AUS) |

The men's road race of the 2022 UCI Road World Championships was a cycling event that took place on 25 September 2022 in Wollongong, Australia.

== Qualification ==
Qualification was based mainly on the UCI World Ranking by nations as of 16 August 2022.

=== UCI World Rankings ===
The following nations qualified.

| Criterium | Rank | Number of riders | | Nations |
| Criterium | Rank | To enter | To start | Nations |
|---|---|---|---|---|
| UCI World Ranking by Nations | 1–10 | 13 | 8 | France; Belgium; Slovenia; Netherlands; Spain; Denmark; Great Britain; Italy; Colombia; Australia |
| UCI World Ranking by Nations | 11–20 | 9 | 6 | Eritrea; New Zealand; Switzerland; Norway; Germany; United States; Ecuador; Poland; Portugal; Czech Republic |
| UCI World Ranking by Nations | 21–30 | 7 | 4 | Kazakhstan; Argentina; South Africa; Canada; Austria; Ireland; Luxembourg; Hungary; Estonia; Slovakia |
| UCI World Ranking by Nations | 31–50 | 2 | 1 | Latvia; Panama; Mongolia; Japan; Venezuela; Ukraine; Sweden; Lithuania; Romania; Algeria; Greece; Morocco; Brazil; Israel; Uzbekistan; Serbia; Turkey; Croatia; Thailand; Rwanda |
| UCI World Ranking by Individuals (if not already qualified) | 1–200 | 2 | 1 | —N/a |

=== Continental champions ===
| Name | Country | Reason |
|---|---|---|
| Julian Alaphilippe | France | Incumbent World Champion |
| Henok Mulubrhan | Eritrea | African Champion |
| Emiliano Contreras | Argentina | Panamerican Champion |
| Igor Chzhan | Kazakhstan | Asian Champion |
| James Fouché | New Zealand | Oceanian Champion |

=== Participating nations ===
169 cyclists from 50 nations competed in the event. The number of cyclists per nation is shown in parentheses.

- Argentina (1)
- Australia (8)
- Austria (3)
- Belgium (8)
- Brazil (1)
- Canada (4)
- China (2)
- Colombia (6)
- Czech Republic (3)
- Denmark (8)
- Ecuador (1)
- Eritrea (6)
- France (9)
- Germany (6)
- Great Britain (8)
- Greece (1)
- Hong Kong (1)
- Hungary (1)
- Israel (1)
- Italy (8)
- Japan (1)
- Kazakhstan (3)
- Latvia (1)
- Lithuania (1)
- Luxembourg (4)
- Malta (1)
- Monaco (1)
- Mongolia (2)
- Morocco (1)
- Netherlands (8)
- New Zealand (1)
- Norway (6)
- Panama (2)
- Poland (3)
- Portugal (4)
- Rwanda (2)
- Serbia (1)
- Slovakia (4)
- Slovenia (6)
- South Africa (3)
- South Korea (1)
- Spain (8)
- Sweden (1)
- Switzerland (6)
- Thailand (2)
- Turkey (1)
- Ukraine (2)
- United States (5)
- Uzbekistan (1)
- Vatican City (1)

== Course ==
The race started in Helensburgh (about 30 km (19 mi) north of Wollongong) before tackling a 34 km (21 mi) loop around Mount Keira (climb length of 8.7 km (5.4 mi) with an average gradient of 5% and a maximum incline of 15%). The race tackled 12 laps of the Wollongong City Circuit. This 17.7 km (11.0 mi) finishing circuit had 220 m (720 ft) of climbing elevation each lap including the Mount Pleasant climb (climb length of 1.1 km (0.68 mi) with an average gradient of 7.7%, maximum incline of 14%).

In total, the Elite Men Road Race climbed 3,945 m (12,943 ft) over a race distance of 266.9 km (165.8 mi) (1 Mount Keira loop, 12x Wollongong City Circuit).

== Final classification ==
Of the race's 169 entrants, 103 riders completed the full distance of 266.9-kilometre (165.8 mi).

| Rank | Rider | Country | Time |
|---|---|---|---|
| 1 | Remco Evenepoel | Belgium | 6h 16' 08" |
| 2 | Christophe Laporte | France | + 2' 21" |
| 3 | Michael Matthews | Australia | + 2' 21" |
| 4 | Wout van Aert | Belgium | + 2' 21" |
| 5 | Matteo Trentin | Italy | + 2' 21" |
| 6 | Alexander Kristoff | Norway | + 2' 21" |
| 7 | Peter Sagan | Slovakia | + 2' 21" |
| 8 | Alberto Bettiol | Italy | + 2' 21" |
| 9 | Ethan Hayter | Great Britain | + 2' 21" |
| 10 | Mattias Skjelmose | Denmark | + 2' 21" |
| 11 | Iván García Cortina | Spain | + 2' 21" |
| 12 | Jan Tratnik | Slovenia | + 2' 21" |
| 13 | Lorenzo Rota | Italy | + 2' 21" |
| 14 | Ben Tulett | Great Britain | + 2' 21" |
| 15 | Mikkel Frølich Honoré | Denmark | + 2' 21" |
| 16 | Rasmus Tiller | Norway | + 2' 21" |
| 17 | Mauro Schmid | Switzerland | + 2' 21" |
| 18 | Neilson Powless | United States | + 2' 21" |
| 19 | Tadej Pogačar | Slovenia | + 2' 21" |
| 20 | Stefan Küng | Switzerland | + 2' 21" |
| 21 | Kevin Geniets | Luxembourg | + 2' 21" |
| 22 | Romain Bardet | France | + 2' 21" |
| 23 | Attila Valter | Hungary | + 2' 21" |
| 24 | Alexey Lutsenko | Kazakhstan | + 2' 21" |
| 25 | Bauke Mollema | Netherlands | + 2' 21" |
| 26 | Benoît Cosnefroy | France | + 2' 21" |
| 27 | Dylan van Baarle | Netherlands | + 2' 21" |
| 28 | Pascal Eenkhoorn | Netherlands | + 2' 21" |
| 29 | Valentin Madouas | France | + 2' 31" |
| 30 | Jan Polanc | Slovenia | + 2' 31" |
| 31 | Sergio Higuita | Colombia | + 2' 31" |
| 32 | Jhonatan Narváez | Ecuador | + 2' 31" |
| 33 | Nicola Conci | Italy | + 2' 31" |
| 34 | Quinten Hermans | Belgium | + 2' 34" |
| 35 | Magnus Cort | Denmark | + 3' 01" |
| 36 | Nickolas Zukowsky | Canada | + 3' 01" |
| 37 | Sven Erik Bystrom | Norway | + 3' 01" |
| 38 | Silvan Dillier | Switzerland | + 3' 01" |
| 39 | Yukiya Arashiro | Japan | + 3' 01" |
| 40 | Sebastian Schönberger | Austria | + 3' 01" |
| 41 | Anders Skaarseth | Norway | + 3' 01" |
| 42 | Zdeněk Štybar | Czech Republic | + 3' 01" |
| 43 | Nathan Van Hooydonck | Belgium | + 3' 01" |
| 44 | Nelson Oliveira | Portugal | + 3' 01" |
| 45 | Bob Jungels | Luxembourg | + 3' 01" |
| 46 | Andrea Bagioli | Italy | + 3' 01" |
| 47 | Jasper Stuyven | Belgium | + 3' 01" |
| 48 | Yves Lampaert | Belgium | + 3' 01" |
| 49 | Jai Hindley | Australia | + 3' 01" |
| 50 | Simon Clarke | Australia | + 3' 01" |
| 51 | Julian Alaphilippe | France | + 3' 01" |
| 52 | Nikias Arndt | Germany | + 3' 08" |
| 53 | Fred Wright | Great Britain | + 3' 08" |
| 54 | Biniam Girmay | Eritrea | + 3' 08" |
| 55 | Michael Mørkøv | Denmark | + 3' 08" |
| 56 | Jakob Fuglsang | Denmark | + 3' 08" |
| 57 | Alexander Kamp | Denmark | + 3' 28" |
| 58 | Emils Liepins | Latvia | + 4' 50" |
| 59 | Michael Kukrle | Czech Republic | + 4' 50" |
| 60 | João Almeida | Portugal | + 5' 16" |
| 61 | Jan Maas | Netherlands | + 6' 11" |
| 62 | Tobias Bayer | Austria | + 6' 11" |
| 63 | Davide Ballerini | Italy | + 6' 11" |
| 64 | Matúš Štoček | Slovakia | + 6' 11" |
| 65 | Marek Čanecký | Slovakia | + 6' 11" |
| 66 | Nairo Quintana | Colombia | + 6' 11" |
| 67 | Heinrich Haussler | Australia | + 6' 11" |
| 68 | Jaka Primožič | Slovenia | + 6' 11" |
| 69 | Merhawi Kudus | Eritrea | + 6' 17" |
| 70 | Anthon Charmig | Denmark | + 6' 20" |
| 70 | Eduardo Sepúlveda | Argentina | + 6' 20" |
| 72 | Jannik Steimle | Germany | + 6' 20" |
| 73 | Keegan Swenson | United States | + 6' 20" |
| 74 | Daryl Impey | South Africa | + 6' 20" |
| 75 | Jesús Ezquerra | Spain | + 6' 20" |
| 76 | Stanisław Aniołkowski | Poland | + 6' 20" |
| 77 | Roger Adrià | Spain | + 6' 20" |
| 78 | Magnus Sheffield | United States | + 6' 20" |
| 79 | Ben Swift | Great Britain | + 6' 20" |
| 80 | Quentin Pacher | France | + 8' 10" |
| 81 | Wout Poels | Netherlands | + 8' 10" |
| 82 | Marc Soler | Spain | + 9' 31" |
| 83 | Ivo Oliveira | Portugal | + 9' 31" |
| 84 | Tobias Foss | Norway | + 9' 31" |
| 85 | Samuele Battistella | Italy | + 9' 31" |
| 86 | Scott McGill | United States | + 10' 23" |
| 87 | Eduard Prades | Spain | + 10' 23" |
| 88 | Simon Pellaud | Switzerland | + 11' 28" |
| 89 | Fabian Lienhard | Switzerland | + 11' 28" |
| 90 | Florian Sénéchal | France | + 11' 28" |
| 91 | Nick Schultz | Australia | + 11' 28" |
| 92 | Mikkel Bjerg | Denmark | + 11' 28" |
| 93 | Wilson Peña | Colombia | + 11' 28" |
| 94 | Andreas Leknessund | Norway | + 11' 28" |
| 95 | Luc Wirtgen | Luxembourg | + 11' 28" |
| 96 | Łukasz Owsian | Poland | + 11' 28" |
| 97 | Felix Gall | Austria | + 11' 28" |
| 98 | Stan Dewulf | Belgium | + 11' 28" |
| 99 | Daan Hoole | Netherlands | + 11' 28" |
| 100 | Ben Turner | Great Britain | + 11' 40" |
| 101 | Pavel Sivakov | France | + 14' 28" |
| 102 | Jake Stewart | Great Britain | + 15' 05" |
| 103 | Connor Swift | Great Britain | + 15' 05" |

| Rank | Rider | Country | Time |
|---|---|---|---|
| | Amanuel Ghebreigzabhier | Eritrea | DNF |
| | Juan Sebastián Molano | Colombia | DNF |
| | Henok Mulubrhan | Eritrea | DNF |
| | Natnael Tesfatsion | Eritrea | DNF |
| | Guy Sagiv | Israel | DNF |
| | Rodrigo Contreras | Colombia | DNF |
| | Bruno Armirail | France | DNF |
| | Pieter Serry | Belgium | DNF |
| | James Fouché | New Zealand | DNF |
| | Luke Plapp | Australia | DNF |
| | Pier-André Côté | Canada | DNF |
| | Maciej Bodnar | Poland | DNF |
| | Vadim Pronskiy | Kazakhstan | DNF |
| | Ben O'Connor | Australia | DNF |
| | Harold Tejada | Colombia | DNF |
| | Jonas Koch | Germany | DNF |
| | Venantas Lašinis | Lithuania | DNF |
| | Sarawut Sirironnachai | Thailand | DNF |
| | Domen Novak | Slovenia | DNF |
| | Rui Oliveira | Portugal | DNF |
| | Christofer Jurado | Panama | DNF |
| | Juraj Sagan | Slovakia | DNF |
| | Tobias Ludvigsson | Sweden | DNF |
| | Luke Durbridge | Australia | DNF |
| | Nicolas Sessler | Brazil | DNF |
| | David Per | Slovenia | DNF |
| | Luke Rowe | Great Britain | DNF |
| | Kyle Murphy | United States | DNF |
| | Derek Gee | Canada | DNF |
| | Urko Berrade | Spain | DNF |
| | Jan Hirt | Czech Republic | DNF |
| | Miguel Heidemann | Germany | DNF |
| | Gotzon Martín | Spain | DNF |
| | Vitaliy Buts | Ukraine | DNF |
| | Muradjan Khalmuratov | Uzbekistan | DNF |
| | Gustav Basson | South Africa | DNF |
| | Matteo Dal-Cin | Canada | DNF |
| | Marc Oliver Pritzen | South Africa | DNF |
| | Taco van der Hoorn | Netherlands | DNF |
| | Bolivar Espinosa | Panama | DNF |
| | Peerapol Chawchiangkwang | Thailand | DNF |
| | Edoardo Affini | Italy | DNF |
| | Georgios Bouglas | Greece | DNF |
| | Lü Xianjing | China | DNF |
| | Mustafa Sayar | Turkey | DNF |
| | Georg Zimmermann | Germany | DNF |
| | Yuriy Natarov | Kazakhstan | DNF |
| | Nico Denz | Germany | DNF |
| | Daniel Bonello | Malta | DNS |
| | Achraf Ed Doghmy | Morocco | DNF |
| | Ognjen Ilić | Serbia | DNF |
| | Choy Hiu Fung | Hong Kong | DNF |
| | Jambaljamts Sainbayar | Mongolia | DNF |
| | Eric Manizabayo | Rwanda | DNF |
| | Metkel Eyob | Eritrea | DNF |
| | Oier Lazkano | Spain | DNF |
| | Bilguunjargal Erdenebat | Mongolia | DNF |
| | Rien Schuurhuis | Vatican City | DNF |
| | Antoine Berlin | Monaco | DNF |
| | Vitalii Novakovskyi | Ukraine | DNF |
| | Moise Mugisha | Rwanda | DNF |
| | Bieken Nazaerbieke | China | DNF |
| | Stefan Bissegger | Switzerland | DNF |
| | Jang Kyung-gu | South Korea | DNF |
| | Colin Heiderscheid | Luxembourg | DNF |
| | Mathieu van der Poel | Netherlands | DNF |
