= Ng Ming Wei =

Singaporean taekwondo athlete

Personal information
- Born: 20 November 1994 (age 31) Singapore
- Height: 177.4 cm (5 ft 10 in)
- Weight: 58 kg (128 lb)
Medal record
Men's taekwondo
Representing Singapore
Southeast Asian Games
| Bronze medal – third place | 2015 Singapore | 54 kg |
| Silver medal – second place | 2019 Philippines | 58 kg |
ASEAN Championships
| Silver medal – second place | 2011 Cambodia | 51 kg |
| Bronze medal – third place | 2015 Ho Chi Minh | 54 kg |
| Silver medal – second place | 2017 Perlis | 54 kg |
Commonwealth Championships
| Gold medal – first place | 2017 Montreal | 58 kg |
Canada Open
| Silver medal – second place | 2017 Montreal | 58 kg |
Riga Open
| Silver medal – second place | 2019 Riga | 58 kg |
Gyeongju Korea Open
| Bronze medal – third place | 2014 Gyeongju | 58 kg |
| Bronze medal – third place | 2016 Gyeongju | 58 kg |

Ng Ming Wei (Chinese: 黃名緯, born 20 November 1994) is a Singaporean taekwondo athlete and internet personality. He won a Kyorugi gold medal in the 2017 Commonwealth Taekwondo Championships Men's -58 kg, becoming the first Singaporean to do so. He also won a bronze medal in the 2015 Southeast Asian Games Men's Under 54 kg.

== Taekwondo career ==
During the 2015 Southeast Asian Games, Ng represented Singapore, attaining a bronze medal in the Men's -54 kg.

In 2016, Ng represented Singapore in the Asian Taekwondo Olympic Qualification for the 2016 Summer Olympics in April 2016, where he lost 7–4 to Sergio Suzuki from Japan in the last sixteen and did not manage to qualify.

During the 2017 Commonwealth Taekwondo Championships, Ng won gold in the men's -58 kg category, against competitors from more than 13 countries. Ng also claimed a silver medal in the Canada Open International Taekwondo Championships that same year.

On 24 March 2019, local news network Mothership published an interview with Ng Ming Wei. Ng was dissatisfied with the level of support he had received from Singapore Taekwondo Federation (STF), Singapore's national governing body for taekwondo, despite winning several medals at international competitions. In response, the STF stated that Ng's achievements were "paltry". As a result, Ng subsequently arranged his own training with the South Korean, Norwegian and Taiwanese national teams. STF clarified that it had approved a sponsorship of S$30,000 in November 2018 for Ng to take a year away from studies to train full-time but only had informed Ng in January 2019 when it was too late to excuse himself from full-time studies.

Shortly thereafter, Ng announced that his carding status with Sport Singapore had been revoked. Ng stated in an interview with Mothership on or around 8 April 2019 that he did not know why his carding status had not been approved. He also stated that to the best of his knowledge, it was Sport Singapore that decided on carding based on input from the STF and its athletes. There was also a delay in his application submission, allegedly due to the STF's failure to respond promptly. Following the articles, other national team athletes also stepped up to share their grievances about their training under STF, including inadequate coaching and the lack of safe avenues for feedback.

In a subsequent article by Lianhe Zaobao, it was further revealed that with the lack of adequate financial support from the STF over the years, Ng's father was resigned to fund Ng's aspirations, spending in excess of S$120,000 over the years. Furthermore, Ng claimed STF also tried absolving themselves of blame by claiming that Ng's father could afford it. When confronted, the STF denied this, but was contradicted with a validated transcript, which stated clearly that they did indeed make such a statement.

On 27 September 2019, Ng announced that matters had been resolved, with a statement on the STF's website that Ng was a "commendable athlete whose athletic performance should not be downplayed".

In 2019, Ng represented Singapore in the 2019 Southeast Asian Games in the Men's -58 kg Kyorugi category. Ng obtained a silver medal, achieving Singapore's best results for Men's Kyorugi since 1999.

=== Social media presence ===
In an effort to attract sponsors to fund his dreams of competing in the 2020 Olympic Games, Ng has been using Instagram to gain media coverage. His Instagram account, featuring videos applying his skills in taekwondo to other sports, such as table tennis, bowling and basketball, has gained a following of 47,500 people on Instagram. His presence in social media was featured on Singaporean newspaper, The Straits Times, as one of Singapore's most followed athletes.

Ng had also started using China's popular video sharing app Tiktok to "get more young people interested in taekwondo", and to share his love for sports through educational content. His creative videos won him the All-Star Southeast Asia 2019. He became popular on the app, amassing followers to become Singapore's top Tiktok creator having become the first to achieve 1 million followers.

He was unable to compete in the 2020 Olympic Games, but however had attended the Games as a social media advisor for World Taekwondo.
