= List of people considered father or mother of a sport =

Those known as the father, mother, or considered a founder of a sport are those who have made important contributions to that sport. In some sports several people are considered the founders, while in others the title of being the "father" or "mother" is debatable.

Subject	Father/mother	Reason
1:8 radio-controlled off-road buggy	Yuichi Kanai (godfather)	Kyosho's lead designer and lifelong employee; best known for the Inferno series of cars, credited for redefining the class from being unreliable and fragile to being tough and user friendlier that helped his employer to lead the 1/8 buggy renaissance from the 1990s, becoming one of the most dominant cars of all time.
American football	Walter Camp	Established the snap, the line of scrimmage, eleven-player teams, and the concept of downs
American Kenpo	Ed Parker	Considered a founder of early American karate and father of codified American Kenpo
American motocross	Edison Dye	Introduced motocross to American riders
American road racing	Cameron Argetsinger	Introduced the first US auto race that was dedicated to road courses at Watkins Glen
American sports car	Fred Tone	Fred Tone was the engineer who designed the first sports car known as the American Underslung
American soccer	Steve Ross (godfather)	Created the New York Cosmos soccer team and imported a number of well known international footballers to the team in an attempt to bring interest to soccer in the US
Angling	Izaak Walton	Author of The Compleat Angler
Argentine football	Alexander Watson Hutton	Founded Argentina’s first organized football leagues and promoted the sport’s development in schools, establishing the foundation for Argentine football culture.
Argentine professional golf	José Jurado	Pioneered Argentine golf on the international stage, becoming the first Argentine golfer to compete in major championships abroad, including the British Open, and inspiring future generations in the sport.
Argentine winter sports	Otto Meiling	Founded Argentina’s first ski club and promoted winter sports development in Patagonia, helping establish Bariloche as a center for skiing and winter tourism.
Association football / Modern football	Ebenezer Cobb Morley	Founded the Football Association and drafted the first official rules of association football, laying the groundwork for the modern game.
Australian rules football	Tom Wills	Co-founded Australian rules football and helped create its first set of rules, establishing the foundation for Australia’s unique national sport.
Australian rules football	H. C. A. Harrison	Refined and promoted the rules of Australian rules football, playing a key role in shaping and popularizing the game as a distinct national sport.
Baseball	Henry Chadwick	Developed baseball's scoring system, statistics, and box score, helping to standardize the game.
Taekwondo in India	Puran Andrew Gurung	Pioneered Taekwondo in India by introducing the martial art in the 1970s, establishing its foundational training programs, and promoting it across the country.
Basketball	James Naismith	Created basketball
Black basketball	Edwin Henderson	Introduced the sport to the black community of Washington, D.C. in the first decade of the 20th century, and organized many early competitions for African Americans
BMX	Scot Breithaupt	Founded BMX as a sport by organizing the first races and establishing the foundations for BMX culture, earning him the title "The Godfather of BMX."
Brahma bull riding	Earl W. Bascom	Introduced Brahma bulls into rodeo events, significantly shaping modern bull riding and influencing the sport’s evolution.
Brazilian football	Charles William Miller	Brought football to Brazil by introducing the first footballs and rules, organizing matches, and helping establish the country’s first football clubs.
Camel Lights	Jim Downing	Built a racecar a season before it became the basis of a new lightweight prototype class in 1985
Canadian rodeo	O. Raymond Knight	Coined the rodeo term "stampede" and was world's first rodeo producer, rodeo stock contractor, and rodeo champion in 1902
Modern chess	Wilhelm Steinitz	First official world chess champion
Drag racing	Wally Parks	Founder of the NHRA and organized the first legitimate drag race
Drag racing	Don Garlits	Innovator of drag racing safety
Drag racing	Eddie Hill	Regarded as the "Four Father" of drag racing for being the first to break the 5-second barrier. AKA "First in the Fours".
Drifting	Kunimitsu Takahashi	Introduced an aggressive high speed cornering technique that became widely used for illicit purposes, which eventually became a sport
East Coast skateboarding	Vinny Raffa (godfather)	Helped shape East Coast skateboarding culture by organizing events, building skateparks, and fostering a community that defined the region’s unique skate style.
Florida skateboarding	Bruce Walker (godfather)	Advanced Florida skateboarding by founding skate teams, organizing competitions, and mentoring prominent skaters, establishing a strong skateboarding culture in the region.
Freestyle BMX	Bob Haro	Pioneered freestyle BMX by developing specialized bikes, creating innovative tricks, and organizing the first freestyle events, shaping the sport’s evolution and culture.
Freestyle Motocross	Mike Metzger (godfather)	Revolutionized freestyle motocross by introducing groundbreaking tricks, such as the backflip in competition, and elevating the sport’s popularity worldwide.
Funny Car	Dick Landy	Advanced Funny Car racing by innovating high-performance drag racing techniques, influencing car design, and setting competitive standards in the sport.
Modern gymnastics	Friedrich Ludwig Jahn	Developed modern gymnastics by founding the Turnverein movement and creating apparatus and exercises that formed the basis of contemporary gymnastic practices.
Modern Handball	Karl Schelenz	Developed modern handball by refining the rules and promoting the sport internationally, contributing to its evolution into the game played today.
Ice hockey	James Creighton	Captained one of the two teams that participated in the first indoor hockey game on 3 March 1875 in Montreal
Import drag racing	Frank Choi	Hosted one of the first events specifically for import cars in the mid-1990s to keep drivers out of street racing that progressed into a professional category
Italian football	James Richardson Spensley	Associated with Genoa CFC; contributed to the modern day-variation of the game in Italy
Italian football	William Garbutt	Laid the foundations of skilled coaching in Italian football
Japanese baseball	Horace Wilson	Credited with introducing baseball in Japan
Japanese baseball	Hiroshi Hiraoka	Credited with establishing the first baseball team
Jogging	Jim Fixx	Founding father
Kart racing	Art Ingels	Developed the world's first kart (1956)
Kenyan running	Colm O'Connell	Founded the first running camp in Kenya
Lacrosse	William George Beers	Codified the sport from its original Indigenous American formation
Mexican taekwondo	Dai-won Moon	Credited with introducing the sport to Mexico; founded school that has trained tens of thousands in the sport
Mississippi rodeo	Earl W. Bascom; Weldon Bascom	Produced the first rodeo in Columbia, Mississippi in 1935
Mixed martial arts	Edward William Barton-Wright	Experimented 1898–1902 with Shinden Fudo Ryu jujutsu, Kodokan judo, British boxing, Swiss schwingen, French savate and a defensive la canne (stick fighting) style that had been developed by Pierre Vigny of Switzerland, which led to the invention of Bartitsu
Model aviation	Joseph S. Ott	Chicago Tribune, in an obituary, referred him as the father mainly for his designs of thousands of model aircraft spanning from the 1920s up to his death in 1986.
Modern bodybuilding	Eugen Sandow	Pioneered modern bodybuilding by popularizing muscle display performances, establishing the first bodybuilding competitions, and setting standards for physique assessment.
Modern bodybuilding	Harold Zinkin	Called so by Arnold Schwarzenegger during a press statement on his passing in 2004; inventor of modern exercise machines
Modern boxing	James Figg	Laid the foundation for modern boxing by being the first recognized champion and establishing early rules
Modern boxing	James J.Corbett	Revolutionized the sport with scientific techniques and defensive strategies, introducing a more sophisticated style
Modern figure skating	Jackson Haines	"Jackson Haines — The Father of Figure Skating", according to Roy Blakey
Modern football in Japan	Dettmar Cramer	Played a pivotal role in developing modern football in Japan by coaching the national team, enhancing training methods, and promoting professional standards, greatly influencing the sport's growth in the country.
Modern rodeo	Earl W. Bascom	Inventor of rodeo gear and equipment that made rodeo into a modern international sport
Modern tennis	Jack Kramer	Creator of the "Open"-era tournaments and the Association of Tennis Professionals
Para-equestrian dressage	Lee Pearson (godfather)	Most decorated para-equestrian rider of all time
Pickleball	Joel Pritchard	One of three inventors of the sport which was invented at Pritchard's home on Bainbridge Island, Washington. Pickleball Hall of Fame 2017 inductee.
Professional Pickleball	John Gulo	Founder of the Professional Pickleball Federation and the Tournament of Champions. Pickleball Hall of Fame 2024 inductee.
Puroresu	Rikidōzan	Popularized puroresu (Japanese professional wrestling) by establishing it as a mainstream sport in Japan, blending traditional wrestling with dramatic storytelling, and inspiring future generations of wrestlers.
Organized radio controlled racing	Ted Longshaw	Regarded as a grandfather of the sport; founded an organization for racing in the United Kingdom (1971); founded governing bodies for organized racing in Europe (1973), the far east (1980) and worldwide (1979)
Organized radio controlled racing	Roger Curtis	Co-founder of Associated Electrics, one of the most significant R/C car brands; contributed to racing
Modern sabre fencing	Italo Santelli	Transformed modern sabre fencing by introducing innovative techniques and footwork, establishing a dynamic style that became the standard in competitive sabre.
Modern surfing	Duke Kahanamoku	Popularized modern surfing worldwide by showcasing the sport internationally, refining surfing techniques, and inspiring global interest in Hawaiian surf culture.
Rodeo bareback bronc riding	Earl W. Bascom	Designed and made the first one-hand rigging in 1924
Rugby union	A. G. Guillemard	Helped formalize rugby union by serving as the first president of the Rugby Football Union (RFU) and contributing to the establishment of standardized rules, shaping the modern game.
Rugby union	William Webb Ellis	"Who with a fine disregard for the rules of football as played in his time first took the ball in his arms and ran with it thus originating the distinctive feature of the rugby game".
Scuba diving	Jacques Cousteau	Developed the aqua-lung jointly with Émile Gagnan; popularized scuba diving as a research diver, writer, and film and television producer and personality
Skateboarding	Skip Engblom (godfather)	Influenced the evolution of skateboarding by co-founding the Zephyr Skate Team (Z-Boys) and promoting a bold, surf-inspired style that transformed skateboarding culture and competition.
Skateboarding	Tony Hawk (godfather)	Redefined skateboarding by advancing technical tricks, notably landing the first 900, and elevating the sport’s popularity through competitions, video games, and media, becoming an iconic figure in skateboarding culture.
Skateboarding	Rodney Mullen (godfather)	Revolutionized skateboarding by inventing fundamental tricks like the kickflip, heelflip, and flatground ollie, shaping the foundation of modern street and freestyle skateboarding.
Snooker	Neville Francis Fitzgerald Chamberlain	Adopted the name and framed the rules in Ooty, India
Snowboarding	Jake Burton Carpenter	Pioneered modern snowboarding by innovating snowboard design, founding Burton Snowboards, and promoting the sport globally, helping to establish snowboarding as a mainstream winter sport.
Stock car racing	Bill France Sr.	Founded the sanctioning body for stock car racing
Supercross	Mike Goodwin	Organized the first supercross race
Telemark skiing	Sondre Norheim	Invented modern telemark skiing by developing the first flexible ski bindings and popularizing the telemark turn, laying the groundwork for contemporary ski techniques.
Televised golf	Frank Chirkinian	Personally responsible for much of the production conventions of modern golf broadcasting
