= Jimmy R. Jagtiani =

Indian taekwondo practitioner

- Born: 11 July 1955 (age 71); Vietnam
- Rank: 8th Dan Black Belt in Taekwondo

Jimmy R. Jagtiani (born 11 July 1955) is the founder of the Taekwondo Federation of India.

== Taekwondo was formed ==
One of earliest Taekwondo instructors in India was Jimmy R. Jagtiani, 8th Dan Black Belt in Taekwondo who began teaching in 1975. In the year 1976 the Taekwondo Federation of India (TFI) was formed and established as a National Body of Taekwondo in India. Jimmy R. Jagtiani is the founder and father of Taekwondo in India. The World Taekwondo Federation (WTF) accorded affiliation to the Taekwondo Federation of India in 1978, the Asian Taekwondo Union (ATU) in 1982, the Indian Olympic Association (IOA) in 1985 and the South Asian Taekwondo Federation (SATF) in 1994 respectively. The Department of Youth Affairs & Sports, Government of India also granted recognition to Taekwondo Federation of India as an apex judicial and autonomous National body of Taekwondo in India in 1988.

== 1st Anniversary of TFI ==
On 2 August 1977, the first anniversary of Taekwondo Federation of India was organized with a demonstration of stunning martial art techniques at the K.D. Singh Babu indoor stadium. The function was inaugurated by the then Ambassador of the Republic of Korea Bum Suk Lee and Banarsi Das Gupta was the Chief Guest. He was so fascinated with the display of Taekwondo, that he promised maximum support in promotion of Taekwondo in India. His Excellency Mr. Bum Suk Lee awarded Ambassador’s Medal and declared Master Jimmy R. Jagtiani, "Founder of Taekwondo in India" in 1977.

== 2nd Anniversary of TFI ==
On 2 August 1978, 2nd Anniversary of Taekwondo Federation of India was organized, Hon’ble Minister Don Wu Chu, Minister of the Republic of Korea was the Chief Guest. Minister Chu was appreciated with the promotion of Taekwondo in India by Master Jimmy R. Jagtiani. Hon’ble Minister Chu awarded Minister’s Medal to Master Jimmy R. Jagtiani and declared "Master Jimmy R. Jagtiani, Father of Taekwondo in India" in 1978.

== National (Olympic) Games ==
Taekwondo was introduced by the Indian Olympic Association, for the first time in the National (Olympic) Games held at New Delhi in the year 1985. The TFI arranged special demonstration by the Korean Experts in the premises of the Prime Minister’s residence, New Delhi on 17 March 1986. The then Prime Minister of India Rajiv Gandhi witnessed the demonstration. He was so impressed that he promised to extend all possible help to the Taekwondo Federation of India, resulting in recognition of the Taekwondo Federation of India in 1988 by the Department of Youth Affairs & Sports, Government of India with the authority to have its corresponding Units in all States and Union territories of India.

== Scholarships ==
The National Institute of Sports (N.I.S.) allowed scholarship benefits to the meritorious sports persons of Taekwondo. The Government of India further allowed employment to the meritorious sports persons of Taekwondo against sports quota vacancies in relaxation of the direct recruitment rules. The Sports Authority of India (S.A.I.) adopted Taekwondo in its syllabus for coaching Instructors and the Railway Department extended concessions for Taekwondo players participating in the National & State Taekwondo Championships.

== Present time ==
At present Taekwondo Federation of India has its affiliated members Association in 26 States/Union Territories besides Services Sports Control Board (S.S.C.B.), Army Sports Control Board (A.S.C.B.), Central Industrial Security Force (CISF) and Taekwondo Academy of India (TAI). The Taekwondo Academy of India was assigned to look after technical matters such as promotion of Taekwondo philosophy, development of Techniques, DAN Promotion Tests, Black Belt Degree, National Instructor Courses and National Referee Courses, as per the curriculum of Kukkiwon, the World Taekwondo Headquarter, Korea. Approximately 2500 members, trainees are under the Taekwondo Federation of India (TFI).
