= Singapore Taekwondo Federation =

National governing body for Taekwondo

- Jurisdiction: National
- Abbreviation: STF
- Founded: 1975
- Affiliation: World Taekwondo
- Affiliation date: 1975
- Regional affiliation: Asian Taekwondo Union
- Headquarters: 35 Joo Chiat Place, Singapore 427759

Official website
- stf.sg
- (Singapore)

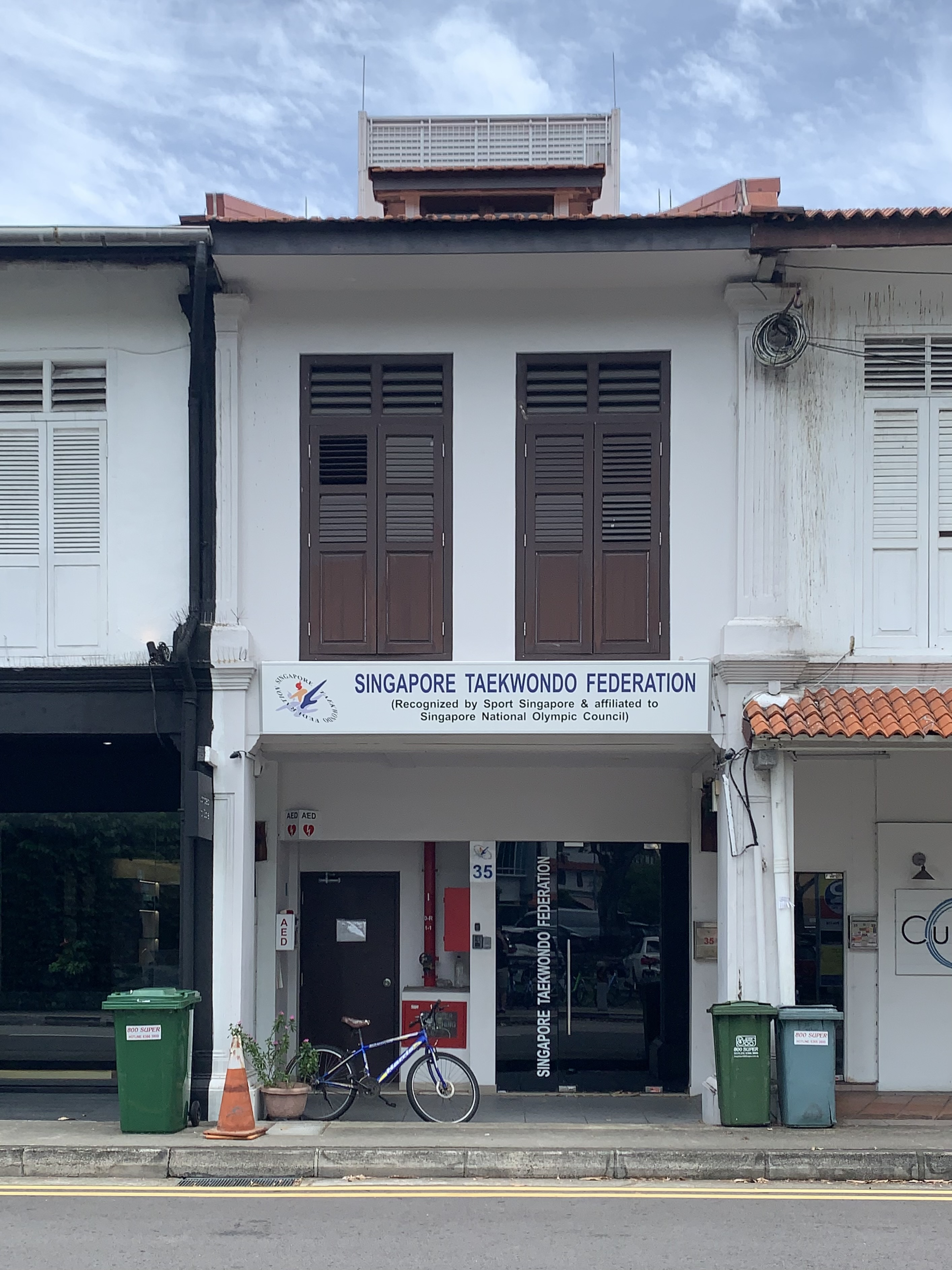
STF's head office at 35 Joo Chiat Place

Singapore Taekwondo Federation (STF) is Singapore's national governing body for taekwondo. It is affiliated to World Taekwondo (WT) and Singapore National Olympic Council (SNOC). In May 2019, the STF was suspended from both organisations.

== History ==
=== Background ===
By the 1970s, Singapore rapidly industrialised, the popularity of sports in general had necessitated the need to create recreational space in the urbanised areas, accommodating sports growing in popularity such as taekwondo. It was estimated that there were 10,000 taekwondo practitioners in 1974, however they were spread out in splinter groups due to personalities and other reasons. In 1974, the Martial Arts Instruction Bill was passed, regulating the martial arts community in general after it was found that 33 of 115 pugilistic organisations were penetrated by secret societies and there were fake organisations being set up to exploit the community as a market. As the law made its way through in the Singapore Parliament, the martial arts community was being reorganised with taekwondo as a sports in Singapore coming under the auspice of the Singapore Taekwondo Federation (STF).

=== 1970s: Founding ===
During the initial pro-term period in 1973–1974, the federation faced integration issues among existing clubs. On 22 November 1973, it was reported that the 5,000-member Singapore Taekwondo Association split away from the federation after a row over the conduct of a grading exercise, in which STA claimed that the credentials of the practitioners of another club were not checked before the grading happened, while STF claimed everything was in order. In 1974, STF took offence at the STA being invited to the first Asian Taekwondo Championships as the competition was to be a national level competition. STF did not send any participants as it was still reorganising its activities and had not registered all exponents as required by the Martial Art Control Unit. On 5 November 1974, it was reported the STA would be seeking affiliations with the federation after having ironed out their points of contention.

On 9 January 1975, it was reported in the New Nation that all black belt holders had to be registered with the federation, and have their certificates verified. In the same news article, all taekwondo clubs had to be registered with the federation as a pre-requisite to their registration with the Controller of Martial Arts.

In 1976, STF aligned itself to the World Taekwondo Federation, breaking away from the International Taekwon-Do Federation, whose founder, Choi Hong Hi, had introduced the martial arts in Singapore in 1961. In the same year, it centralised the grading of white to brown belt first degree to a Board of Examiners, effectively putting the practice of grading conducted by individual clubs, while the black belt grading would be conducted in the presence of Korean exponents flown in from South Korea.

=== 2018–present: Alleged mismanagement, breaches and suspension from governing bodies ===
On 22 June 2018, the federation was fined S$30,000 by the Personal Data Protection Commission, after it was found that it had inadvertently disclosed personal data (such as the National Registration Identity Card number) of 782 students. The column containing data was minimised in a publicly available, unprotected Excel spreadsheet file for the 2017 Inter-School Taekwondo Championships.

On 1 October 2018, Milan Kwee resigned as president of the STF, citing two reasons for doing so. First, he wanted to make way for "young, more energetic and smarter" members to take over. Second, he did not wish to hog his position after more than a decade in charge. Following his resignation, first vice-present Ho Mun Wai, honorary treasurer Juliana Seow and assistant honorary treasurer Ng Lee Noi also decided to leave the STF management committee. An emergency meeting was held by the STF's management committee four days later on 5 October. Following the meeting, the management committee decided to invite Kwee back as an advisor. However, this invitation did not sit well with the then-second vice-president Lee Chee Wee and committee member Yeo Soon Keong. Both persons quit thereafter. Notwithstanding the same, Kwee rejected the invitation. David Koh would then step in to be the federation's acting president.

On or around 22 October, Sport Singapore's chief executive officer, Lim Teck Yin, expressed concerns about the sudden management change and stated that the situation was being monitored closely.

On 24 March 2019, in an interview with Mothership, Ng Ming Wei, a national taekwondo athlete with several wins at international competitions revealed that most of his training activities and equipment were funded by his parents, while had faced "uphill battle getting support from the STF". On 8 April, Ng's carding status was revoked, which in turn revoked his access to government sponsored sports medicine consultation and services. STF claimed that Ng had to be reminded thrice before making his application, to which Ng responded that he initiated the conversation on the upcoming carding application, and that he was delayed by the secretary-general, Wong Liang Ming's late replies to his queries. On 24 April, STF sent Ng a legal letter accusing Ng of making false allegations and misleading statements to the media. It also alleged that Ng had defamed the STF by targeting its integrity. The STF also threatened to commence legal proceedings against Ng if he refused to discuss his grievances with them privately.

In Ng's 24 March interview, it was revealed that STF had no head coach for more than a year since the previous coach had left. Instead, training was supposedly to be conducted by Wong while a new head coach was being appointed. However, along with other former and current national athletes whose interviews were published on 4 May on Mothership, the kyorugi training instead was being led by the senior squad captain, Raja Zulfadli, and alleged that the STF did not provide hands-on attention, and had a system that did not nurture their athletic development or improvement. They alleged that Wong's feedback was being too generic, and the STF officials made them spend training time on non-training matters.

On 2 May, WT issued an ultimatum, requesting that the STF management step down or have its affiliation suspended. On 8 May, STF was subsequently suspended by WT, and Singapore National Olympic Council (SNOC) would follow suit, suspending STF as well. These suspensions prevented STF from participating in WT sanctioned activities, receiving funding from WT, and representing Singapore at international events. The SNOC immediately established a major Games preparation committee to manage the national squad selection and training.

On 9 May, Sport Singapore responded to Mothership's news articles. Sport Singapore stated that the legal tussle between Ng and the STF was a "very unfortunate development" and that the STF should have been "cognisant that its legal action, if not well founded, could be detrimental to their standing and role of leading the Taekwondo fraternity".

On 10 May, committee member Leon Koh resigned, stating that "the needs of the many is (sic) becoming neglected over the needs of a few". The same day, WT named Wong Liang Ming and Lim Teong Chin who were the then secretary-general and general manager respectively as having breached parts of its codes of ethics. They were of the opinion that their husband and wife relationship were a conflict of interest. The next day on the 11 May, Raja Zulfadli filed a police report against Wong, alleging that she compelled him to show her a group chat between him, other athletes and SNOC on his phone. Wong would later refute the allegations, claiming that she had asked for permission. On the same day, it was reported in The Sunday Times that Wong would be stepping down from both the management committee and coaching.

On 19 May, in an extraordinary general meeting, STF's affiliates gave approval for a five-person interim management committee (IMC) selected by the SNOC to temporarily manage the federation, and also accepted WT's directive to have the current management team step aside. The IMC was tasked to review the federation's constitution, review and develop standard operating procedures, address conflict-of-interest issues, establish relevant policies, review and develop selection policies for athletes and competition officials, and create a multi-year sports development plan.

In August, Wong was charged by WT. Wong was deemed to have violated WT codes prohibiting harassment and protecting personal rights. The dispute between the STF and Ng was ultimately settled with the publication of a joint statement on 27 September.

On 11 January 2020, WT informed the STF that Wong had been suspended for alleged grave misconduct. As such, the STF disallowed Wong's continued participation in STF-related activities.

In October, Edwin Lee, a veteran sports administrator was elected as the president of STF to help restore the standing of the federation. Edward Lee's presidency was cut short by six months when he died on 24 May 2021, and David Koh stepped in once again to be the acting president. Philip Choo was subsequently elected as STF's president on 24 September 2022 but resigned less than three months later on or around 20 December 2022.

STF's suspension from SNOC was lifted on 26 January 2023, followed by WT on 28 May 2023 during a Council meeting.

== Presidents ==
- 2004 to 2018 - Milan Kwee
- 2018 to 2021 - David Koh (acting president)
- 2021 to May 2022 - Edward Lee
- June 2022 - September 2022 - David Koh (acting president)
- September 2022 - December 2022 - Philip Choo
- December 2022 – Present - Prof Tan Cheng Han
