= Puran Andrew Gurung =

Indian Taekwondo practitioner (born 1949)

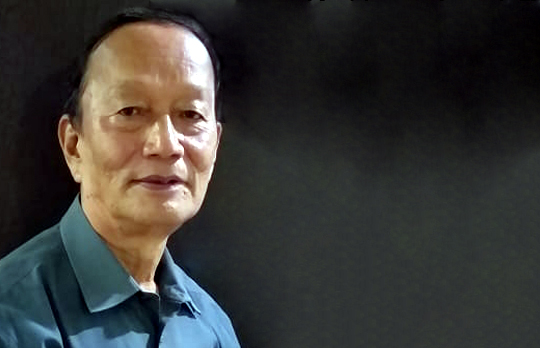
- Born: 13 November 1949 (age 76); Kalimpong, West Bengal, India
- Other names: Grand Master PA Gurung
- Style: Taekwondo
- Teacher: Lee Pyung Pal
- Rank: 9th dan, Taekwondo

Other information
- Website: pagitas.com

Puran Andrew Gurung (Hindi pronunciation: [Puuruhn Aendroo Guhruhng]; born 13 November 1949) is an Indian Taekwondo practitioner and coach. He is a 9th dan Taekwondo professional and is known for establishing Taekwondo in India. Gurung founded his first Taekwondo gymnasium at Kalimpong in 1974 and by 1982 had become the most popular Taekwondo instructor in India. He established a vast chain of academies across the nation, and for his efforts towards promoting Taekwondo in India he was acknowledged by the then-Prime Minister Indira Gandhi. He was requested to train Indian National Congress' Seva Dal cadets. In 1983, Mrs. Gandhi asked him to join INC, which he readily accepted, where he still serves as the General Secretary (Organiser) of the Seva Dal.

He established several social organizations in India, and served as the coach of Nepal National Team from 1986 to 1989. His students from Nepal won four bronze medals at the 1986 Asian Games in Seoul and one bronze medal at the 1988 Summer Olympics (by Bidhan Lama), and he also contributed his services as vice-chairman at the 8th Asian Taekwondo Championship, Kathmandu.

He is the acting National Coordinator Taekwondo/Martial Arts at Sports Federation of India, New Delhi. He is among the Directors of International Taekwondo Council - U.K., International Technical Director International Ch'ang Taekwondo Federation - Canada, Chairman of Taekwondo Development Foundation - New Delh, All India Taekwondo Federation - New Delhi, and PAG International Taekwondo - New Delhi. He is also the Brand Ambassador of Guinness World Record in India (Taekwondo). He is considered the patron of Korean Culture Center in New Delhi. He has served as chairman of the Taekwondo Federation of India - Technical Committee and National Disciplinary Committee, and was the Competition Director at the 2011 National Games of India.

== Biography ==
=== Early life ===
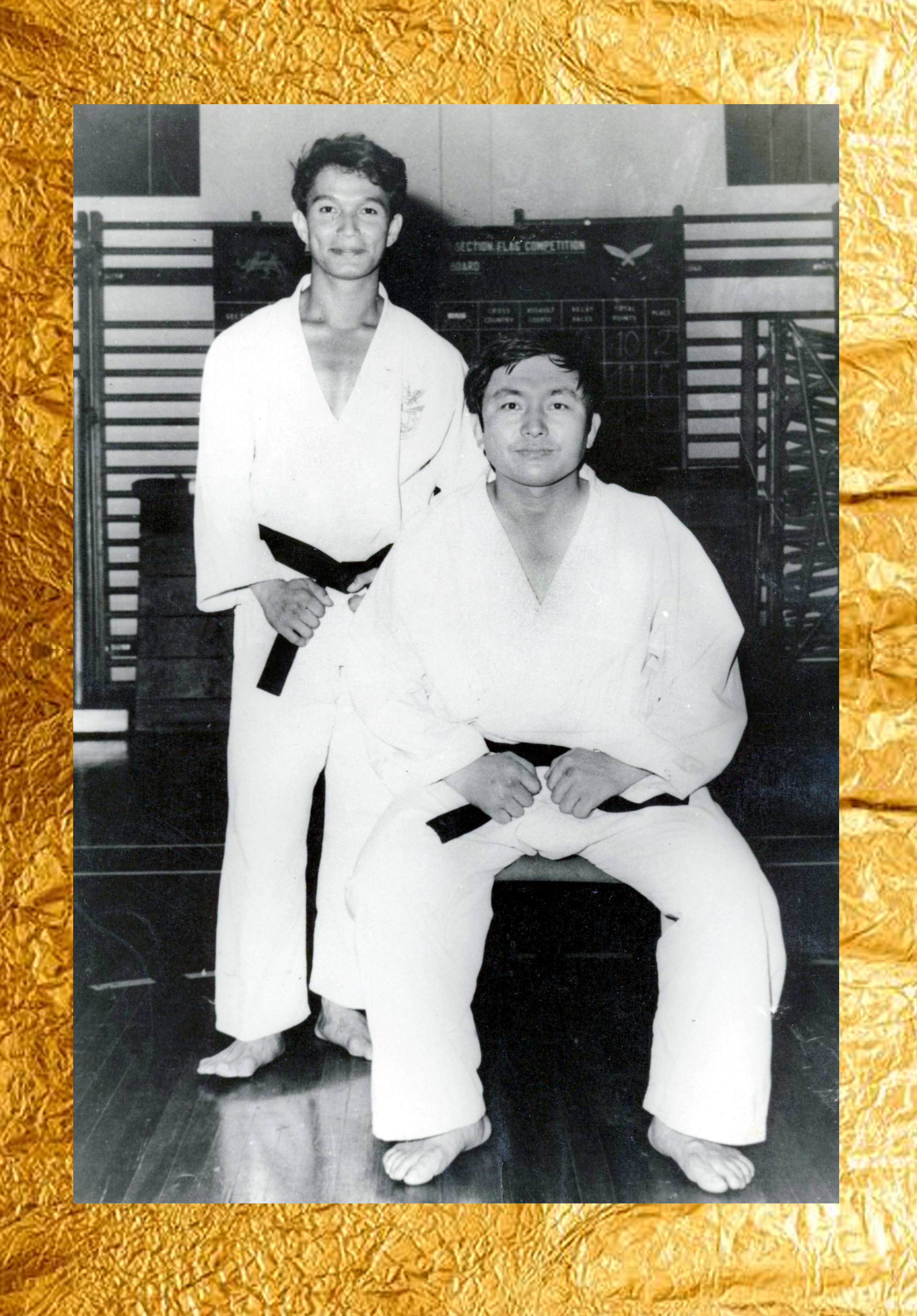
P.A. Gurung with Great Grandmaster Lee Pyung Pal his instructor in the early days - Photo P.A Gurung

G M Gurung was born on 13 November 1949 in Kalimpong, West Bengal, India.

=== Initiation of professional Taekwondo ===
In 1970, while he was posted in Hong Kong as part of the British Army, Gurung and his friend John casually went to YMCA International, Kowloon, where they met Great Grand Master Lee Pyung Pal. Gurung and John were quite impressed with his distinctive style, and requested Master Lee to start Taekwondo training classes in the Army Cantonment Area at Sekkong Army Camp. Master Lee accepted the offer and began to train Gurung and many other Gurkha army personnel. This was the first Gurkha batch of Taekwondo trainees in the history of the Taekwondo movement. Later, Shin Jae Kyun took over this group from Lee. Gurung, Swiba Lepcha, Ratna Bahadur Pun, Lal Sunder Rai and some others also visited YMCA for extra classes from Great Grand Master Lee. Puran Andrew Gurung, Ratna Bahadur Pun, Chandra Bahadur Gurung, Kamal Bahadur Gurung and Ramesh Goshai were the first Gurkhas to earn black belt in Taekwondo history. In 1973, Puran Andrew Gurung earned his 2nd dan before his return to India.

=== Premature retirement from Army ===
In 1973, Gurung was selected to participate in the 1st World Taekwondo Championships, but could not proceed to Korea, with his official obligations proving to be his biggest roadblock. It was then he realized that to pursue his passion of Taekwondo, he would have to retire from the British Army. Without hesitation, he left the military and went to Nepal later in 1973.

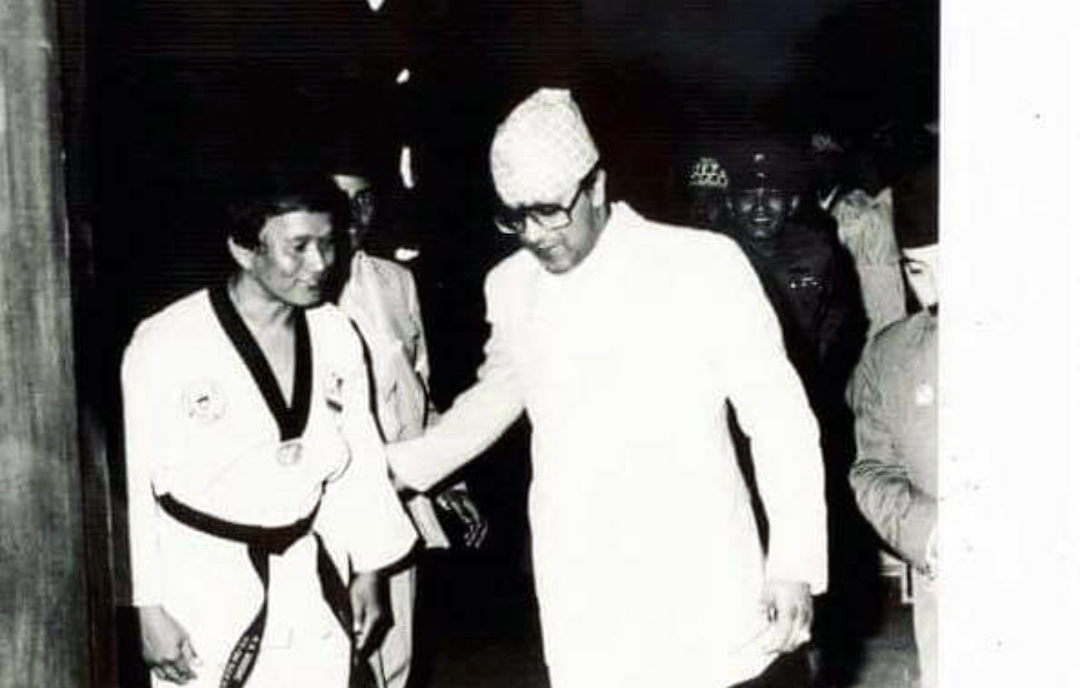
GM P Andrew Gurung with His Royal Highness Prince Dhirendra Bir Bikram Shah, Patron National Sports Council Nepal, while Demonstration of Taekwondo, at City Hall Kathmandu, 1982

=== First Taekwondo instructor of Nepal ===
He tried to initiate a Taekwondo academy at Kathmandu, but martial arts training for civilians was prohibited in Nepal at the time. When he did his first demonstration in Nepal in 1973, he faced severe consequences and finally had to flee from Nepal. Gurung and his team from Kolkata were invited by his students Deepraj Gurung and Dinesh Rai from the Darjeeling Taekwondo Club to demonstrate Taekwondo for the second time at City Hall, Kathmandu in 1982. Prince Dhirendra of Nepal, Patron National Sports Council Nepal was the chief guest, witnessing the presentation by Gurung and his team. Sharad Chandra Shah, Member Secretary of National Sports Council of Nepal was also present at the event. Impressed by the demonstration, Prince Dhirendra instructed Shah to open a Taekwondo academy in Nepal. Puran Andrew Gurung accepted the offer and deputised his pupils Deepraj Gurung and Dinesh Rai as his representative instructors at Nepal. Shah was also advised by Puran Andrew Gurung to officially invite Shin Jae Kyun through the World Taekwondo Federation. In 1986, he was again pursued to become the coach of the Nepal National Team of Taekwondo. Gurung agreed, and his trainees won 4 bronze medals at the 1986 Asian Games in Seoul and 1 bronze medal (Bidhan Lama) at the 1988 Summer Olympics.

=== First taekwondo instructor of India ===
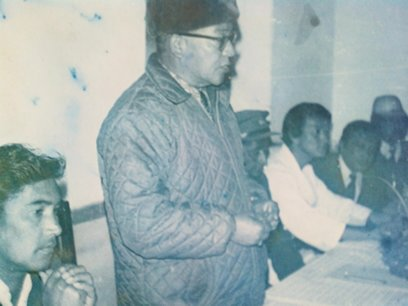
Sri P R Pradhan, Principle S. U. M. I. School, In the Opening ceremony of First Taekwondo Gymnasium of India in Kalimpong in 1974.

Having no other option after fleeing from Nepal in 1973, he came back to his home town in Darjeeling and started the first Taekwondo Gymnasium of India at Scottish University Mission Institute (SUMI) in 1974 at Kalimpong, followed by Darjeeling Taekwondo Academy at Turn Bull High School, and another academy located in Gangtok, Sikkim where he personally trained the students till 1978, becoming the first Taekwondo instructor in India. In 1978, Gurung began his 'National Taekwondo Voyage' in India. He came to Kolkata, and by 1981 established four other academies in the following locations: Kolkata at Hindi High School, St Thomas School, BBYS, and the YMCA. After 1981, he expanded his arm to different parts of India, notably Madras, Bangalore, Calicut, Kerala, Hyderabad, Tamil Nadu, Karnataka, Andhra Pradesh, Orissa, Bihar, Assam, Guwahati, Meghalaya, Mizoram, among others. By this time he became the most popular Taekwondo instructor in India, consequently inviting professional rivalries. In 1982, he shifted to Delhi and started his academy at Jawaharlal Nehru University with assistant instructor Chandu Bhutia and Delhi University with assistant instructor Dr. Sunil Kaul. Later, the Official Taekwondo Hall of Fame USA conferred upon him the title of Father of Taekwondo India and Nepal.

=== Life as a social worker ===
Apart from his Taekwondo fame, Gurung was also known as an active social worker. He established several NGOs that worked for the education of children from underprivileged sections of the society and for women's empowerment. He established Tentulkuli Jankalyan Samity at Howrah and the Little Angel School, which taught children up to the third grade. Gurung continuously donated a major portion of his earnings to the school. He further established different NGO's for women's empowerment in different parts of India, notably "Jan Hit" in Guwahati and Itanagar.

=== Indian National Congress ===
In 1983, Indira Gandhi, then Prime Minister of India, created a committee to find experts of different subjects and skills to teach and train Seva Dal (frontal organisations of the Indian National Congress) volunteers. Considering the popularity of Gurung, Jagdish Tytler (MP and former minister), advised Mrs. Gandhi to call Gurung to teach self defense to the volunteers. Gurung then received an invitation from the Prime Minister's Office to meet Mrs. Gandhi. There, Mrs. Gandhi requested him to join Seva Dal as an instructor, and he readily accepted the offer. This expanded his scope significantly, and he traveled to every part of India, promoting Taekwondo and training Seva Dal volunteers. He is still serving as the General Secretary of the Seva Dal in New Delhi.

=== PAG International Taekwondo ===
""PAG International Taekwondo is a subsidiary functional body constituted under the Sports Federation of India in the patronage of Gurung. This initiative began as a result of the ceaseless efforts of the Grand Master P. Andrew Gurung in establishing Taekwondo in India and Nepal. He is considered the "Father of Taekwondo in India and Nepal". The association aims to further his aspirations regarding Taekwondo in upcoming generations and conserve his legacy. It is also meant to streamline Taekwondo and martial arts across the nation to maximize the output of performing athletes.
