= Prosper Masatu Makonya =

Tanzanian sports administrator

Prosper Masatu Makonya is a Tanzanian sportsperson who was elected as president of the East and Central African Tae Kwon Do Confederation on 30 October 2004 in Nairobi, Kenya. Masatu was previously chairman of the Union of Taekwondo Tanzania as well as an executive member of World Taekwondo Federation (WTF).

== See also ==
- Taekwondo in Africa
