= French Federation of Taekwondo and Related Disciplines =

Taekwondo Federation

- Abbreviation: FFTDA
- Founded: 1995
- Affiliation: World Taekwondo, International Taekwon-Do Federation
- Headquarters: Lyon, France
- President: Hassane Sadok

Official website
- fftda.fr
- (France)

French Federation of Taekwondo and Related Disciplines (French: Fédération française de taekwondo et disciplines associées (FFTDA) is an "association loi de 1901" which aims to organize on the French territory the practice of taekwondo, hapkido, tang soo do and Soo Bahk Do since 1995.

It is affiliated with European federations and organizations (European Taekwondo Union and All Europe Taekwon-do Federation) and World Taekwondo and International Taekwon-Do Federation governing taekwondo and its associated disciplines.

== History ==
After taekwondo was introduced in France by Lee Kwan-Young in 1968, the FFTKD was created in 1978 and joined the French Karate Federation (FFKAMA) in 1979. It was renamed CNT (National Taekwondo Committee) in 1994.

In 1995, the FFTDA was created to succeed the CNT as an independent federation.

Since the 2010s, the federation has an average of 50,000 members in 900 clubs.
