= Taekwondo in India =

Korean martial art in India

History of Taekwondo in India
- Governing body: Taekwondo Federation of India
- First played: 2000

International competitions
- Asian Taekwondo Championships; World Taekwondo Championships; Summer Olympics

Taekwondo is one of the most popular and practiced martial arts in India. It is characterized by punching and kicking techniques, with emphasis on head-height kicks, jumping spinning kicks, and fast kicking techniques. The literal translation for tae kwon do is "kicking", "punching", and "the art or way of".

== History ==
Master Puran Andrew Gurung introduced taekwondo to India after serving in Brigade of Gurkhas he returned to India to teach and promote Taekwondo. During his tenure as a Gurkha soldier in Hong Kong he studied Taekwondo under Korean Grand Master Lee Pyung Pal from 1969 to 1974. Since 1974 he has been promoting Taekwondo after earning his 2nd Dan under Great Grand Master Lee Pyung Pal. He initially started Taekwondo classes in Kalimpong, Darjeeling and Gangtok, Sikkim with other Taekwondo instructor Daniel Russ Gurung. Later he expanded his trainings to Kolkata, southern, northeast and northern parts of India. He traveled frequently to every part of India until 1984. He has been conferred the title of "Father of Taekwondo in India" by official taekwondo hall of fame USA.

Taekwondo introduced to India around 1975 and one of earliest Taekwondo instructors in India was Jimmy R. Jagtiani, 8th Dan Black Belt in Taekwondo who began teaching in 1975. On 2 August 1976 the Taekwondo Federation of India (TFI) was formed and established as a National Body of Taekwondo in India.

The World Taekwondo Federation (WTF) accorded affiliation to the Taekwondo Federation of India in 1978, the Asian Taekwondo Union (ATU) in 1982, the Indian Olympic Association (IOA) in 1985 and the South Asian Taekwondo Federation (SATF) in 1994 respectively. The Department of Youth Affairs & Sports, Government of India also granted recognition to Taekwondo Federation of India as an apex judicial and autonomous national body of taekwondo in India in 1988.

Grand Master Kiranpal, an international referee, has been working for Indian taekwondo since 1988, when for the first time, taekwondo was demonstrated at the 1988 Summer Olympics. Atul Pangotra is also an international referee and coach who started his sports journey in 1988. At the 2020 Summer Paralympics, he qualified in the top 50 officials. While, Sarbjeet Singh is the first ever referee from India to officiate in the 2018 World Taekwondo Grand Prix Series and also qualified among top 50 Officials for 2020 Tokyo Paralympics.

== Notable players ==
=== Aruna Singh Tanwar ===
Aruna Tanwar is an Indian Para Taekwondo athlete and two time Olympian from Haryana. She is currently ranked World No.4 in the W-49 kg | K43 | and World No. 30 in the W-49 kg | K44 event category of World Para Taekwondo Events. She qualified to represent India at the 2024 Summer Paralympics at Paris, her second Olympics.

=== Kashish Malik ===
Kashish represented India in the 2018 Asian Games where she crashed out in the quarterfinals. She has bagged medals at various international events like, Malaysia Open G1 Tournament, Asian Games Invitation Tournament, President Cup, Fujairah Open 2018 and Israel Open 2018.

=== Aman Kumar Kadyan ===
Aman Kumar Kadyan is a Taekwondoin based out of Haryana and has represented India at various national and international events. He competes in -54 kg and currently holds -18 Rank in the world.

=== Atul Raghav ===
Atul Raghav is a renowned Taekwondoin based out of Ghaziabad and has represented India at various national and international events. Atul's brightest moment under the sun though came in the year 2020 when he bagged a bronze medal in the 2020 G-2 Fujairah Dubai. He is also a national referee and a sports management professional working to improve the sports conditions in India. In 2021, he was appointed as the brand ambassador of Ghaziabad Municipal Corporation. In January 2025, he was appointed as the delegate of Viksit Bharat Young Leaders Dialogue where he pitched the vision of Making India a Fit and Sporting Nation by 2047 to Prime Minister Narendra Modi, top Ministry officials at Bharat Mandapam, New Delhi.

=== Rodali Barua ===
Rodali usually represents the country in the +73 kg weight category and had brought various laurels to the country. She had represented India in the World Taekwondo Championships in Korea in June 2017 and won gold at the 35th National Senior Kyorugi and 8th National Senior Pumche Taekwondo Championships held in Visakhapatnam. Represented India in Asian Games 2018

=== Kaiser Rehan ===
Kaiser Rehan is a Taekwondo practitioner, coach, and referee from Bihar. He has participated in several national and international Taekwondo events and won a gold medal at an international championship.

== Tournament record ==
Competition	Gold	Silver	Bronze	Total
Asian Games	0	0	1	1
Total	0	0	1	1

- updated till 2023
