= India Taekwondo =

National governing body for Taekwondo Sport in India

- Sport: Taekwondo
- Jurisdiction: India
- Membership: State and UT associations
- Abbreviation: IT
- Affiliation: World Taekwondo
- Affiliation date: 1979
- Regional affiliation: Asian Taekwondo Union
- Affiliation date: 1982
- Headquarters: 403 Timmy Arcade Makwana Road, near Marol Naka Metro Station, Marol Andheri, East Mumbai
- President: Namdev Shirgaonkar
- Secretary: Amit Dhamal
- Replaced: Taekwondo Federation of India

Official website
- www.indiataekwondo.com
- (India)

India Taekwondo is the national governing body for taekwondo in India. It replaced Taekwondo Federation of India from July 2019. It is affiliated to World Taekwondo and bears recognition from Ministry of Youth Affairs & Sports.

Due to ongoing disputes among the office bearers of the previous governing body of erstwhile Taekwondo Federation of India, the Indian Olympic Association took matters into its own hands and formed an ad hoc committee for taekwondo federation of India in its Annual General Body Meeting 2019, to provide relief to affected Taekwondo athletes nationwide. The ad hoc committee was tasked to create a new legal entity to replace the then existing Taekwondo Federation of India within 6 Months of its constitution. The same ad hoc committee emerged as "India Taekwondo" and submitted its stand to the World Taekwondo & Indian Olympic Association. This decision was welcomed and accepted by the WT President in an email dated 9 July 2019, however the decision of the Indian Olympic Association is not yet clear on the matter.

Even after clear stand of World Taekwondo regarding India Taekwondo being the only national sport federation for Taekwondo in India, a faction led by officials of dis-affiliated & de-recognized Taekwondo Federation of India without providing the factual information and stand of World Taekwondo, pleaded to permit themselves to conduct the elections for their society as per Indian Societies Act 1860 to the Delhi High Court. The Apex court considered the plea & passed an order for conduction of elections & appointed Court Commissioner cum Returning Officer for the same.

After the completion of elections on 14 Nov 2022, TFI with new office bearers has tried to claim its status as the national sports federation, however the Ministry of Youth Affairs & Sports, Government of India recognizes only INDIA TAEKWONDO as the National Sports Federation.

Jimmy R. Jagtiani is the founder and father of taekwondo in India. Jagtiani, who was born in Vietnam in 1955, had emigrated to India Lucknow, Uttar Pradesh with his family to escape the Vietnam War. He founded the Taekwondo Federation of India on 2 August 1976, and is regarded as the father of taekwondo in India. The federation marked its first anniversary in 1977 with a demonstration of high power taekwondo techniques at the K.D. Singh Babu Indoor Stadium in Lucknow. The TFI received affiliation from the World Taekwondo Federation (WTF) in 1979, the Asian Taekwondo Union (ATU) in 1982, the Indian Olympic Association (IOA) in 1985, and the South Asian Taekwondo Federation (SATF) in 1994.

Taekwondo was included as a discipline for the first at the 1985 National Games in New Delhi. The TFI organized a special taekwondo demonstration by Korean Taekwondo Practitioners for then Prime Minister Rajiv Gandhi at the Prime Minister's residence on 17 March 1986. Gandhi was impressed by the demonstration and agreed to "extend all possible help" to the TFI. The Union Ministry of Youth Affairs and Sports officially recognized the TFI as the national governing body for taekwondo in 1988.

The TFI granted affiliation to the Services Sports Control Board in 1990, the Taekwondo Academy of India in 1990, Army Sports Control Board (ASCB) in 1992, and the Central Industrial Security Force (CISF) in 1995. Numerous state/UT taekwondo boards are also affiliated to the TFI.
