= Austrian Olympic Committee =

National Olympic Committee

- Country: Austria
- Code: AUT
- Created: 1908
- Recognized: 1912
- Continental Association: EOC
- Headquarters: Vienna, Austria
- President: Horst Nussbaumer
- Secretary General: Florian Gosch
- Website: www.olympia.at

The Austrian Olympic Committee (German: Österreichisches Olympisches Komitee, ÖOC; IOC Code: AUT) is the non-profit organization representing Austrian athletes in the International Olympic Committee (IOC). The ÖOC also represents the selection of Austrian cities in their bid to be the site for the Olympic Games.

ÖOC is headquartered in Vienna.

== History ==
The Austrian Olympic Committee was created in 1908 and formally recognized by the IOC in 1912.

== List of presidents ==
President	Term
Balduin Groller	1908–1912
Otto Herschmann	1912–1914
Rudolf Graf Colloredo-Mannsfeld	1914–1921
Theodor Schmidt	1929–1938
Josef Gerö	1946–1954
Heinrich Drimmel	1956–1969
Heinz Pruckner	1969–1972
Kurt Heller	1973–1990
Leo Wallner	1990–2009
Karl Stoss	2009–2025
Horst Nussbaumer	2025–present

== Member federations ==
The Austrian national federations are the organizations that coordinate all aspects of their sports. They are responsible for training, competition, and development of their sports. There are currently 32 Olympic summer and 6 winter sports federations in Austria.

National federation	Summer or winter	Headquarters
Austrian Archery Association	Summer	Wals-Siezenheim
Austrian Athletics Federation	Summer	Vienna
Austrian Badminton Association	Summer	Vienna
Austrian Baseball Federation	Summer	Vienna
Austrian Basketball Federation	Summer	Vienna
Austrian Bobsleigh and Skeleton Federation	Winter	Innsbruck
Austrian Boxing Federation	Summer	Reichersberg
Austrian Canoe Federation	Summer	Vienna
Austrian Climbing Federation	Summer	Innsbruck
Austrian Curling Association	Winter	Vienna
Austrian Cycling Federation	Summer	Vienna
Austrian Equestrian Federation	Summer	Laxenburg
Austrian Fencing Federation	Summer	Graz
Austrian Figure Skating Association	Winter	Vienna
Austrian Football Association	Summer	Vienna
Austrian Golf Association	Summer	Vienna
Austrian Gymnastics Federation	Summer	Vienna
Austrian Handball Federation	Summer	Vienna
Austrian Hockey Federation	Summer	Vienna
Austrian Ice Hockey Association	Winter	Vienna
Austrian Judo Federation	Summer	Vienna
Austrian Karate Federation	Summer	Sankt Pölten
Austrian Luge Federation	Winter	Innsbruck
Austrian Modern Pentathlon Federation	Summer	Wöllersdorf-Steinabrückl
Austrian Rowing Federation	Summer	Vienna
Austrian Rugby Federation	Summer	Vienna
Austrian Sailing Federation	Summer	Neusiedl am See
Austrian Shooting Federation	Summer	Innsbruck
Austrian Speed Skating Association	Winter	Vienna
Austrian Ski Federation	Winter	Innsbruck
Austrian Swimming Federation	Summer	Vienna
Austrian Table Tennis Association	Summer	Vienna
Austrian Taekwondo Federation	Summer	Schwaz
Austrian Tennis Association	Summer	Vösendorf
Austrian Triathlon Federation	Summer	Linz
Austrian Volleyball Bundesliga	Summer	Vienna
Austrian Weightlifting Federation	Summer	Vienna
Austrian Wrestling Federation	Summer	Wals-Siezenheim

== Pierre de Coubertin Medal ==
Since 1969, the Austrian Olympic Committee has awarded a Pierre de Coubertin-Medaille, 'Pierre de Coubertin Medal' "for outstanding merits in the Olympic Movement". The first recipients at a ceremony held on 23 June 1969 in the Museum of the 20th Century in Vienna were Austrian President Franz Jonas, IOC President Avery Brundage, IOC member Manfred Mautner Markhof, the Minister of Education Theodor Piffl-Perčević, the ÖOC President Heinrich Drimmel, and the ÖOC Hon. Secretary-General Edgar Fried. Later recipients include Rudolf Sallinger, Pat Hickey, and Dieter Kalt Sr..

== See also ==
- Austria at the Olympics
