= All Japan Taekwondo Association =

Taekwondo association

- Headquarters: Tokyo, Japan

Official website
- www.ajta.or.jp

The All Japan Taekwondo Association (Japanese: 一般社団法人全日本テコンドー協会, is an organization that oversees and represents the WTF Taekwondo in Japan. Established in its current form in 2005. Since May 2019 it has been a member of the Japan Olympic Committee. Since July 2019 they are no longer affiliated with the Japan Sport Association.

== History ==
Before World Taekwondo control system in Japan was established, there were four main organizations. After the cooperative relationship between the groups was established in 1999, the division / power was divided in two in 2004.

Initially, the Japan Olympic Committee informed themselves to consolidate groups as a condition of participation in the 2004 Athens Olympic Games, conflicting over the integration problem between the two divided organizations (All Japan Taekwondo Association and Japan Taekwondo Federation).

=== Japan Taekwondo Federation ===
In 1981, it was founded as the "Taekwondo Association of Japan" (unrelated to the existing JTA), dissolved in 1983, renamed "Japan Taekwondo Federation" and joined JOC. A mainstream group as of the 2000 Sydney Olympic Games. The All Japan Taekwondo Association was conflicted again after merger, part of it divided as "Japan Taekwondo Union".

=== Japan Taekwondo Union ===
An organization that divided on the basis of the Japan Taekwondo Federation in 2004. In 2006 integrated with the All Japan Taekwondo Association.

=== All Japan Taekwondo Association ===
Inaugurated in the 1990s against the Japan Taekwondo Federation. Merger with Taekwondo Federation of Japan in 1999. After that split again, integrated with the All Japan Taekwondo Association

=== Korea Taekwondo Association in Japan ===
An organization formed in 1969 for the purpose of disseminating Taekwondo in Japan. The general headquarters is Osaka. Since 1999 we have formed a cooperative relationship with the Taekwondo Federation of Japan.

=== Eagle party (Eagle party) ===
Dojo founded in Kanagawa prefecture Kawasaki city founded in 1970s. 1999 from Japan Taekwondo Federation registered players. Originally Karate Dojo, when the chairman came to teach korea to korea at 1982, he took home the Taekwondo in the field and brought it back to Japan. The president has served as a body guard for Tanaka Kakuei.

=== Split again with dissidents ===
In November 2014, the Taekwondo Association against the current executive department such as Fukushima and Kumamoto (one company) launched the All Japan Taekwondo Federation (hereinafter referred to as Federation), and the Federation announced the signing of an agreement with Korea National Academy. On the other hand, the association side has strongly repulsed.
