= Austrian Taekwondo Federation =

Taekwondo Federation

- Sport: Taekwondo
- Jurisdiction: Austria
- Affiliation: World Taekwondo

Official website
- www.oetdv.at
- (Austria)

The Austria Taekwondo Federation is the largest Taekwondo Association in Austria. It is a member of the Austrian Olympic Committee.

== International competition ==
Austria Taekwondo Federation is a member of the European umbrella organization European Taekwondo Union as well as the World Association for World Taekwondo (WT).

On the part of the Austria Olympic Committee, the Austria Taekwondo Federation is the only Taekwondo Association authorized to send athletes to the Olympic Games.
