= Taekwondo New Zealand =

Sports governing body in New Zealand

- Sport: Taekwondo
- Jurisdiction: New Zealand
- Abbreviation: TNZ
- Founded: 2019
- Affiliation: World Taekwondo
- Regional affiliation: Oceania Taekwondo Union
- President: Grandmaster Jin Keun Oh
- Vice president: Master Kesi O'Neil
- Secretary: Darryl June

Official website
- newzealandtaekwondo.co.nz
- (New Zealand)

Taekwondo New Zealand is the governing body for the sport of taekwondo in New Zealand.

Taekwondo New Zealand is the Member National Association for World Taekwondo in New Zealand, as recognised by World Taekwondo.
