= Hellenic Modeling Federation =

Hellenic Modelling Federation (Ελληνική Μοντελιστική Ένωση)
- Category: R/C Car racing
- Abbreviation: ELME (ΕΛ.Μ.Ε.)
- Affiliation: EFRA
- Headquarters: Athens
- President: Papanikolaou Ioannis
- Secretary: Stathopoulos Vasilis

Official website
- www.el-me.gr
- (Greece)

The Hellenic Modelling Federation (or ELME) is a non profit organization pursuing the promotion of the radio controlled hobby and racing of all types of radio controlled cars in Greece. Founded in the mid 1990s by a group of R/C enthusiasts, with purpose of making this hobby known to Greece, the Federation has evolved through the years offering its members national championships and access to foreign events such as European and World championships.

At the current form, national events are organized for various classes throughout Greece in various locations and venues. ELME offers insurance for any accidents that might occur, to all the participating members. Each year ELME produces a rules booklet for every racing class, with specific directives regarding maximum and minimum dimensions, weight, homologated motors, batteries, fuel etc. These terms make sure the races organized are fair and no members shall have advantage against others, promoting the sports spirit and fair play.

Membership costs €30 per year and all members have the right to vote in the annual general meeting, have access to all events the federation is organizing if they pay their entry fee and are invited to the annual party together with their families.

ELME is a member of EFRA (European Federation Of Radio Operated Model Automobiles). ELME takes into serious consideration of EFRA rules and uses their lists of approved equipment used in model racing as guidance in order to form its own set of rules.

== Greek Champions list ==
=== On-Road ===
==== 1/10 EP Touring Modified ====
| Year | Name | Nationality |
|---|---|---|
| 2002 | Katikas Haris | Greece |
| 2003 | Louis Filippos | Greece |
| 2004 | Katikas Haris | Greece |
| 2005 | Katikas Haris | Greece |
| 2006 | Doucakis Giannis | Greece |
| 2007 | Doucakis Giannis | Greece |
| 2008 | Zacharopoulos Kostas | Greece |
| 2009 | Doucakis Giannis | Greece |
| 2010 | Doucakis Giannis | Greece |
| 2011 | Georgiadis Nikos | Greece |
| 2012 | Georgiadis Nikos | Greece |
| 2013 | Georgiadis Nikos | Greece |
| 2014 | Georgiadis Nikos | Greece |
| 2015 | Georgiadis Nikos | Greece |
| 2016 | Isaakidis Filippos | Greece |
| 2017 | Georgiadis Nikos | Greece |
| 2018 | Isaakidis Filippos | Greece |
| 2019 | Isaakidis Filippos | Greece |
| 2020 | Isaakidis Filippos | Greece |
| 2021 | Ioannidis Dimitris | Greece |
| 2022 | Ioannidis Dimitris | Greece |
| 2023 | Ioannidis Dimitris | Greece |

==== 1/10 IC Touring ====
| Year | Name | Nationality |
|---|---|---|
| 2000 | Kidis Giannis | Greece |
| 2001 | Sotiropoulos Giannis | Greece |
| 2002 | Pappas Nikos | Greece |
| 2003 | Piknis Spiros | Greece |
| 2004 | Sotiropoulos Giannis | Greece |
| 2005 | Fakaros Manolis | Greece |
| 2006 | Limnios Thanasis, Sidiropoulos Kostas | Greece |
| 2007 | Sotiropoulos Giannis | Greece |
| 2008 | Sotiropoulos Giannis | Greece |
| 2009 | Sidiropoulos Kostas | Greece |
| 2010 | Zacharopoulos Kostas | Greece |
| 2011 | Sotiropoulos Giannis | Greece |
| 2012 | Likaris Vasilis | Greece |
| 2013 | Sotiropoulos Giannis | Greece |
| 2014 | Sotiropoulos Giannis | Greece |
| 2015 | Karabelas Nikos | Greece |
| 2016 | Likaris Vasilis | Greece |
| 2017 | Likaris Vasilis | Greece |
| 2018 | Likaris Vasilis | Greece |
| 2019 | Likaris Vasilis | Greece |
| 2020 | Dimitriou Dimitris | Greece |
| 2021 | Dimitriou Dimitris | Greece |
| 2022 | Dimitriou Dimitris | Greece |

==== 1/8 IC Track ====
| Year | Name | Nationality |
|---|---|---|
| 1993 | Tsiapas Aris | Greece |
| 1994 | Aronis Ioulianos | Greece |
| 1995 | Orphanos Giannis | Greece |
| 1996 | Orphanos Giannis | Greece |
| 1997 | Stergiou Marinos | Greece |
| 1998 | Stergiou Marinos | Greece |
| 1999 | Stergiou Marinos | Greece |
| 2000 | Stergiou Marinos | Greece |
| 2001 | Sotiropoulos Giannis | Greece |
| 2002 | Stergiou Marinos | Greece |
| 2003 | Agelakopoulos Fotis | Greece |
| 2004 | Arkoumanis Giannis | Greece |
| 2005 | Arkoumanis Giannis | Greece |
| 2006 | Sotiropoulos Giannis | Greece |
| 2007 | Sotiropoulos Giannis | Greece |
| 2008 | Sotiropoulos Giannis | Greece |
| 2009 | Sotiropoulos Giannis | Greece |
| 2010 | Sotiropoulos Giannis | Greece |
| 2011 | Zacharopoulos Kostas | Greece |
| 2020 | Totomis Evaggelos | Greece |
| 2021 | Totomis Evaggelos | Greece |

==== 1/12 EP Pan-car ====
| Year | Name | Nationality |
|---|---|---|
| 2006 | Doucakis Giannis | Greece |

==== 1/8 IC GT ====
| Year | Name | Nationality |
|---|---|---|
| 2020 | Sidiropoulos Kostas | Greece |
| 2021 | Tarounas Christos | Greece |
| 2022 | Agrafiotis Konstantinos | Greece |
| 2023 | Agrafiotis Konstantinos | Greece |

=== Off-Road ===
==== 1/8 IC Buggy ====
| Year | Name | Nationality |
|---|---|---|
| 1992 | Klonis Vasilis | Greece |
| 1993 | Venos Kostas | Greece |
| 1994 | Venos Kostas | Greece |
| 1995 | Venos Kostas | Greece |
| 1996 | Theologitis Stelios | Greece |
| 1997 | Theologitis Stelios | Greece |
| 1998 | Blachopoulos Tasos | Greece |
| 1999 | Theologitis Stelios | Greece |
| 2000 | Theologitis Stelios | Greece |
| 2001 | Theologitis Stelios | Greece |
| 2002 | Theologitis Stelios | Greece |
| 2003 | Theologitis Stelios | Greece |
| 2004 | Theologitis Stelios | Greece |
| 2005 | Theologitis Stelios | Greece |
| 2006 | Theologitis Stelios | Greece |
| 2007 | Theologitis Stelios | Greece |
| 2008 | Theologitis Stelios | Greece |
| 2009 | Kontouzoglou Stamatis | Greece |
| 2010 | Theologitis Stelios | Greece |
| 2011 | Theologitis Stelios | Greece |
| 2012 | Paparegas Tasos | Greece |
| 2013 | Paparegas Tasos | Greece |
| 2014 | Paparegas Tasos | Greece |
| 2015 | Paparegas Tasos | Greece |
| 2016 | Paparegas Tasos | Greece |
| 2017 | Paparegas Tasos | Greece |
| 2018 | Paparegas Tasos | Greece |
| 2019 | Paparegas Tasos | Greece |
| 2020 | Paparegas Tasos | Greece |
| 2021 | Paparegas Tasos | Greece |
| 2022 | Paparegas Tasos | Greece |
| 2023 | Grigoriadis Nikos | Greece |

==== 1/10 EP Buggy 2WD ====
| Year | Name | Nationality |
|---|---|---|
| 2007 | Bournias Vasilis | Greece |
| 2008 | Theologitis Stelios | Greece |
| 2009 | Bournias Vasilis | Greece |
| 2010 | Zacharopoulos Kostas | Greece |
| 2011 | Amaksas Giorgos | Greece |
| 2012 | Tsigkos Dimitris | Greece |
| 2013 | Papanikolaou Giannis | Greece |
| 2014 | Floudas Nikos | Greece |
| 2015 | Paparegas Tasos | Greece |
| 2016 | Paparegas Tasos | Greece |
| 2017 | Fotinos Dimitris | Greece |
| 2019 | Theodorou Savvas | Greece |
| 2020 | Ioannidis Dimitris | Greece |
| 2021 | Ioannidis Dimitris | Greece |

==== 1/10 EP Buggy 4WD ====
| Year | Name | Nationality |
|---|---|---|
| 2010 | Floudas Nikos | Greece |
| 2011 | Floudas Nikos | Greece |
| 2012 | Androulidakis Nikos | Greece |
| 2013 | Papagiannakopoulos Argiris | Greece |
| 2014 | Floudas Nikos | Greece |
| 2015 | Papanikolaou Giannis | Greece |
| 2016 | Amaksas Dimitris | Greece |
| 2017 | Amaksas Dimitris | Greece |
| 2020 | Ioannidis Dimitris | Greece |
| 2021 | Ioannidis Dimitris | Greece |
