= Australian Taekwondo =

Australian sports governing body

- Sport: Taekwondo
- Jurisdiction: Australia
- Abbreviation: AUS TKD
- Founded: 2014
- Affiliation: World Taekwondo
- Regional affiliation: Oceania Taekwondo Union
- Chairperson: Hugh Eagling
- CEO: Josh O’brian
- Secretary: Harry Saltis

Official website
- www.austkd.com.au
- (Australia)

Australian Taekwondo, also known as AUS TKD, is the governing body for the sport of taekwondo in Australia.

== History ==
Taekwondo Australia (TA) and Sports Taekwondo Australia (STA) were once two separate organisations for taekwondo in Australia. In 2013 the two bodies signed an agreement which culminated in a merger in 2014. The new board had an equal number of members from each organisation, with an independent chairperson.

In 2022, Australian Taekwondo announced the opening of a new "high performance hub" for elite taekwondo athletes in Melbourne, co-funded by the Australian Institute of Sport.

== Structure ==
Sports Taekwondo Australia is affiliated to the Oceania Taekwondo Union and World Taekwondo and is recognised by the Australian Olympic Committee.

Taekwondo Australia is a full member sport of the Combat Institute of Australia (CombatAUS).

== Functions ==
Australian Taekwondo stages the Taekwondo National Championships. The 2023 event is due to be staged in Brisbane.
