= Nigeria Taekwondo Federation =

Governing body for Taekwondo in Nigeria

- Sport: Taekwondo
- Jurisdiction: Nigeria
- Affiliation: World Taekwondo

Official website
- www.nigeriataekwondofederation.org
- (Nigeria)

Nigeria Taekwondo Federation is a member of the African umbrella organization African Taekwondo Union (ATU) as well as the World Association for World Taekwondo (WT).

On the part of the Nigeria Olympic Committee, the NOC is the only Taekwondo Association authorized to send athletes to the Olympic Games.

== See more ==
- Nigerian Olympic Committee
