= Dominican Republic Taekwondo Federation =

Governing body of taekwondo, Dominican Republic

Coordinates: 18.476142°N 69.916343°W

- Sport: Taekwondo
- Jurisdiction: Dominican Republic
- Abbreviation: FEDOTAE
- Founded: 1981
- Affiliation: World Taekwondo
- Regional affiliation: Pan American Taekwondo Union
- President: Miguel Camacho
- Director: Arquimedes De Jesus
- Secretary: Max Maldonado
- Coach: Emmanuel Mateo, Max Maldonado, Dinanyiris Furcal

Official website
- www.fedotae.com
- (Dominican Republic)

The Dominican Taekwondo Federation (Federación Dominicana de Taekwondo) is the governing body for the sport of taekwondo in the Dominican Republic.

== History ==
The roots of taekwondo in the Dominican Republic can be traced back to the 13th of September, 1981. Under the leadership of martial artists and sports enthusiasts, the federation started to gain recognition and support from various stakeholders, including the Dominican government and international taekwondo bodies. Federation was founded in order to group all the local associations within the Dominican Republic.

== Objectives and Activities ==
The primary objective of the Dominican Taekwondo Federation is to promote, develop, and regulate the practice of taekwondo in the country. To achieve this, the federation engages in several key activities:

1. National Competitions: The federation organizes and oversees national taekwondo competitions in various age groups and weight categories. These competitions serve as platforms for athletes to showcase their skills and qualify for international events.
2. International Representation: The Dominican Taekwondo Federation is responsible for selecting and sponsoring the country's representatives in international competitions, including the Olympic Games, World Taekwondo Championships, Pan American Taekwondo Championships, and other continental tournaments.
3. Coaching and Education: The federation provides training and educational programs for coaches, referees, and judges. By maintaining a high standard of coaching and officiating, they aim to improve the overall level of Taekwondo in the Dominican Republic.
4. Youth Development: Recognizing the importance of nurturing young talent, the federation actively promotes Taekwondo at the grassroots level. They organize events and workshops in schools and communities to introduce the sport to children and identify potential future champions.
5. Anti-Doping and Fair Play: The Dominican Taekwondo Federation is committed to maintaining a clean and fair sport. They have anti-doping programs in place to ensure that athletes compete on a level playing field and adhere to the principles of fair play.

== Affiliations ==
The Dominican Taekwondo Federation is a member of various national and international sports organizations. At the national level, it is recognized by the Dominican Olympic Committee (Comité Olímpico Dominicano) and the Ministry of Sports (Ministerio de Deportes). Internationally, the federation is affiliated with World Taekwondo (WT), the international governing body for the sport.
