= Ghana Taekwondo Federation =

Taekwondo Federation

- Sport: Taekwondo
- Jurisdiction: Ghana
- Founded: 1988
- Affiliation: World Taekwondo

Official website
- taekwondoghana.com
- (Ghana)

The Ghana Taekwondo Federation is the largest taekwondo association in Ghana. It is a member of the Ghana Olympic Committee. It was originally called the Ghana Taekwondo Association.

The GTF organised the 2017 World Taekwondo Open Championship.

== History ==
In the mid-1970s Bok Nam Kim, a Korean Taekwondo instructor was brought to Ghana to teach the sports in the Ghana Armed Forces but Taekwondo was accepted as an official sports by the National Sports Council in 1980 and the first ever tournament was held in 1981 at the Accra Sports Stadium.
