= Kosovo Taekwondo Federation =

- Sport: Taekwondo
- Jurisdiction: Kosovo
- Founded: 2001
- Affiliation: World Taekwondo
- Affiliation date: 2013

Official website
- www.findglocal.com/XK/Pristina/181092635321034/Kosovo-National-Taekwondo-Team-%28Official%29
- (Kosovo)

The Kosovo Taekwondo Federation (Albanian: Federata e Taekwondos e Kosovës or FTK) is the official governing body for the sport of taekwondo in Kosovo and was founded in 2001.

The KTF was admitted the International Taekwondo Federation at its 2013 Annual Congress. From 14 July 2013 to 12 May 2015 the KTF was a provisional member of WTF. The KTF was granted full WTF membership at the WTF assembly on 12 May 2015.

== Taekwondo in Kosovo ==
Taekwondo was introduced to Kosovo by Master Nuhi Gashi in 1998, when he opened up the Pristina Taekwondo Club. Today there are dozens of clubs and schools in the country, including the Pristina Taekwondo School, Tiger Taekwondo and Hapkido Academy, and Pristina Martial Ars Academy in the nation's capital; the Kastrioti Taekwondo Club; the Prizren Taekwondo Club; the Gjilan Taekwondo Club; the Shqiponja Taekwondo Club in Kaçanik; the Mitrovica Martial Arts Academy; and the Kosovo Polje Taekwondo Club.
