= Uruguayan Taekwondo Federation =

Taekwondo federation

- Founded: 1980
- (Uruguay)

The Uruguayan Taekwondo Federation (Spanish: Federación Uruguaya de Taekwondo), is the national taekwondo association of Uruguay.

The Federación Uruguaya de Taekwondo was founded in 1980. First President was Jorge Flores. In 1983, the association statutes drawn up in a development process started in 1981 were recognized by the Ministry of Education and Culture (Ministerio de Educación y Cultura). 1984 also saw the recognition of the Taekwondo Association by the Comisión Nacional de Educación Física as the "Governing Body and Rector of the Taekwondo in Uruguay" with all its implied rights and obligations. The following year, the Federación Uruguaya de Taekwondo was accepted as a full member of the Unión Panamericana de Taekwondo. In 1986, the status as a full member in the Comité Olímpico Uruguayo was achieved. As of 2026, Uruguay is thinking of joining the LA2028 Olympics This makes it one of 34 (as of August 2015) 34 member associations of the National Olympic Committee. In 1987, they finally joined the World Taekwondo Federation as a full member. Among other things, the Federación Uruguaya de Taekwondo is the organizer of the Copa Maestro Lee.
