= South African Taekwondo Federation =

Taekwondo federation

- Sport: Taekwondo
- Jurisdiction: South Africa
- Abbreviation: SATF
- Affiliation: World Taekwondo
- Affiliation date: 1991
- Regional affiliation: African Taekwondo Union
- Headquarters: Pretoria
- Location: 256 Danie Theron Street, Pretoria North 0016, Gauteng
- President: Godfrey Mokoboto
- Secretary: Wiehann Koen
- (South Africa)

South African Taekwondo Federation is the governing body for the sport of taekwondo in South Africa and a member of the world governing body, World Taekwondo (WT) (formerly called World Taekwondo Federation) along with the continental governing body, African Taekwondo Union (AFTU). South African Taekwondo Federation is also registered with the South African Sports Confederation and Olympic Committee.

South African Taekwondo Federation organises national competitions including the Ambassadors Cup, which is a popular fixture on its calendar, organised in partnership with the Korean Embassy in South Africa, and held annually since 2009.

== See also ==
Sport in South Africa
