= European Federation of Radio Operated Model Automobiles =

Radio-controlled car racing authority

- Category: Radio-controlled racing
- Jurisdiction: Europe
- Abbreviation: EFRA
- Founded: May 1973
- Affiliation: IFMAR
- Headquarters: Sweden
- President: Jacqueline Aebi

Official website
- www.efra.ws
- (Europe)

The Europäische Föderation Radiogesteuerter Automodelle (EFRA), better known in English as the European Federation of Radio Operated Model Automobiles, is the governing body of radio-controlled car racing in Europe.

== History ==
Setup in May 1973, EFRA's original members were France, Germany, the Netherlands, Italy, Switzerland and Yugoslavia. They established a set of rules which did was not approved by the British. After discussion, BRCA's Ron Moody withdrew their membership. The idea of organisation was to regulate radio-controlled car racing though Europe. Although each member country would retain their own governing body, EFRA would try to make homogenous rules which form the basis of most of the rules in each member country, and also for European championship racing.

EFRA was chosen as it could be adapted by a large number of each member counties languages. In English, for the British membership, European Federation Of Radio Operated Model Automobiles is what is used to define EFRA.

== Purpose ==
EFRA now has 32 member countries and represents Europe in IFMAR (International Federation of Model Auto Racing). Just as EFRA represent European countries, IFMAR represents these larger groups such as EFRA.

EFRA provides list of approved components such as engines and tuned pipes for use in model cars. It also governs racing of the European Championships for radio controlled car racing, which caters for most classes of models.

== Secretariat ==
=== Presidents ===
| # | Name | Nationality | Term |
|---|---|---|---|
| 1. | Udo Eyers | West Germany | 1973–? |
| 2 | Ted Longshaw | United Kingdom | ?–1983 |
| 3 | Bill Burkinshaw | United Kingdom | –2003 |
| 4 | Erhard "Dallas" Mathiesen | Sweden | 2003–2018 |
| 5 | Frank Mostrey (acting) | Belgium | 2018 |
| 6 | Javier García Collado | Spain | 2018– 2022 |
| 7 | Jacqueline Aebi | Switzerland | 2022– |

=== Secretaries ===
| # | Name | Nationality | Term |
|---|---|---|---|
| 1. | Erhard "Dallas" Mathiesen | Sweden | ?-2004 |
| 2 | Frederick Scholander | Sweden | 2005-2009 |
| 3 | Willy Wurts | Belgium | 2009-2024 |
| 4 | Mark Rumble | United Kingdom | 2024- |

== Members ==
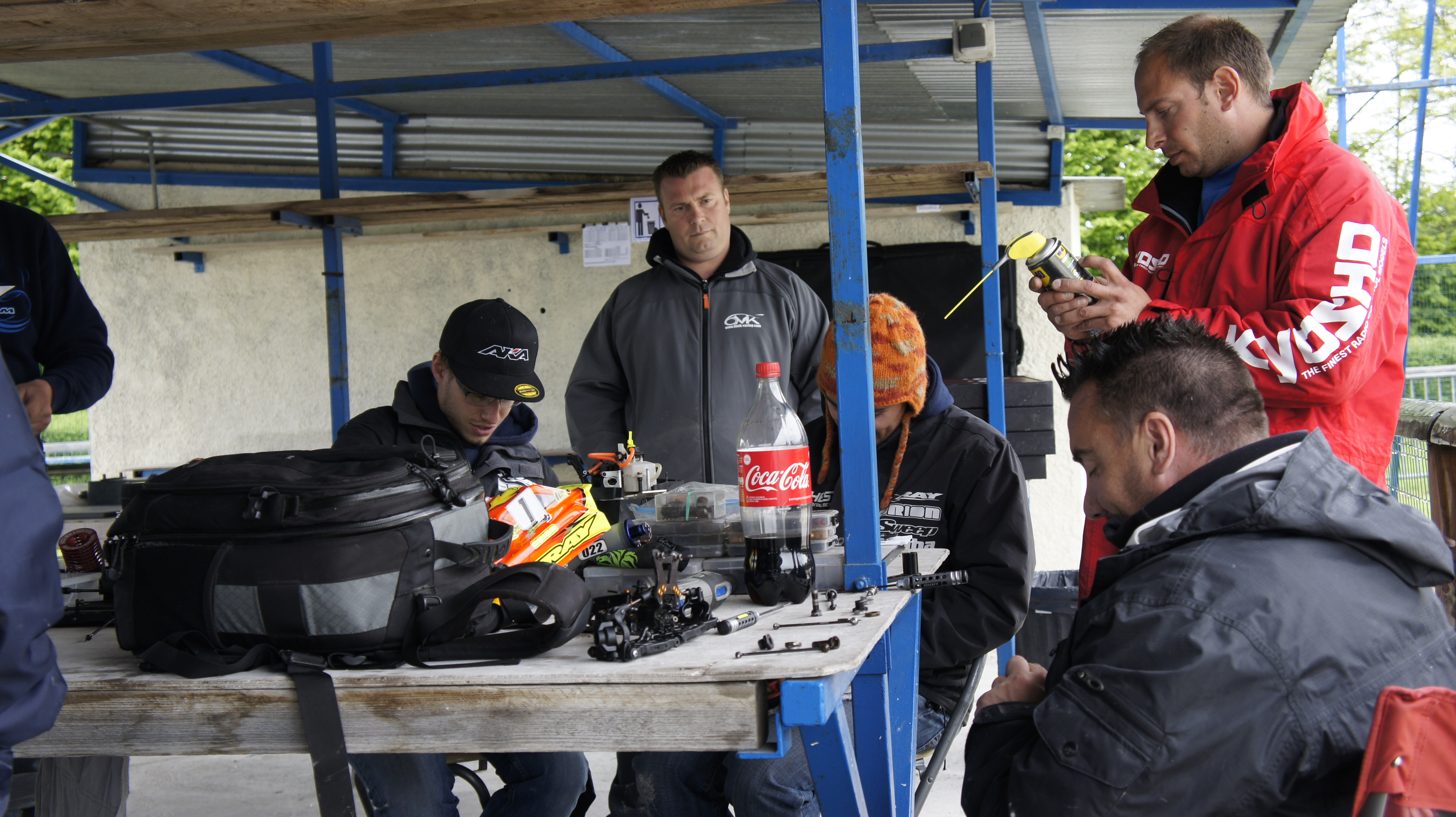
French Team at Rheims.

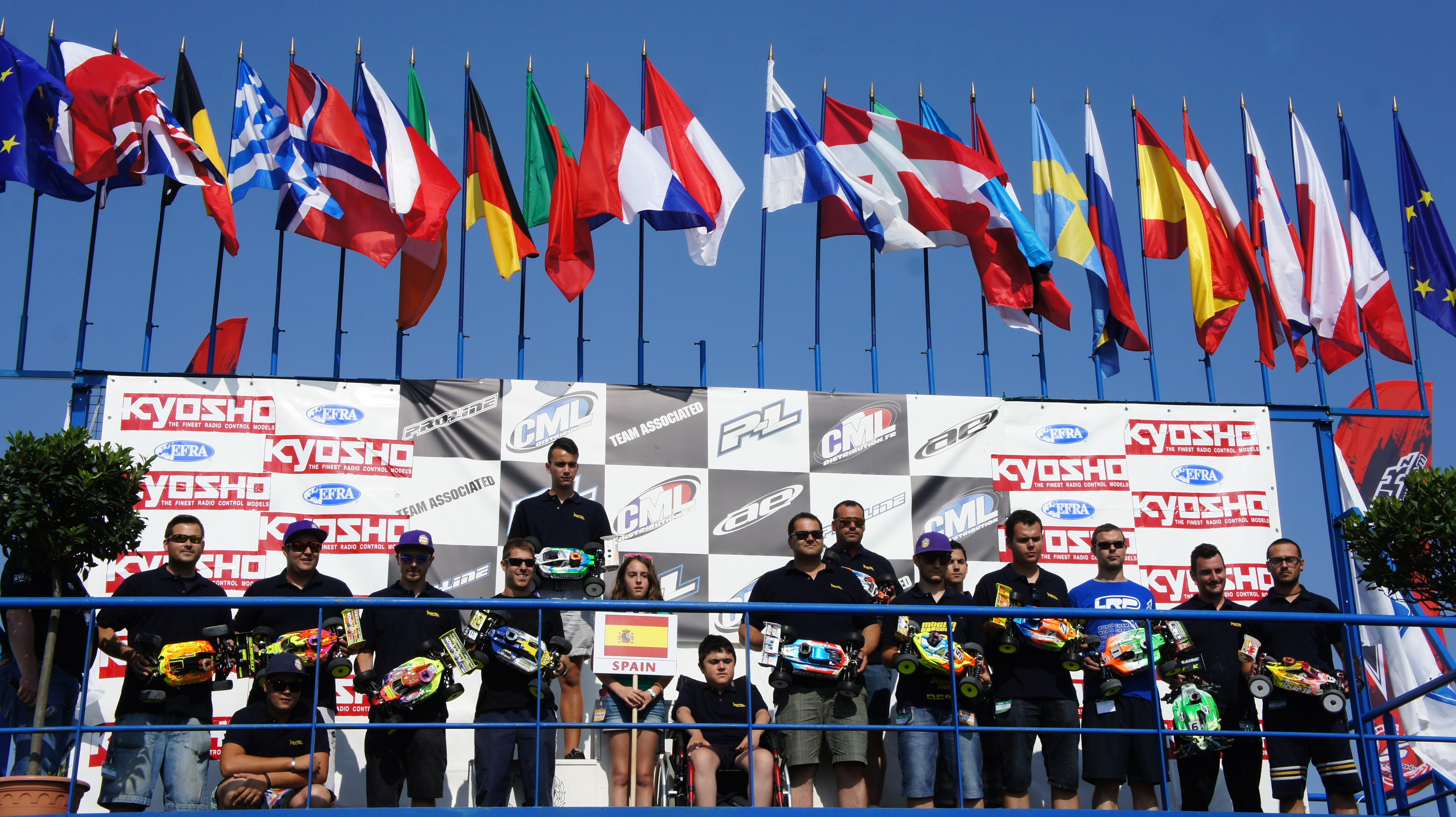
Spanish Team at Rheims.

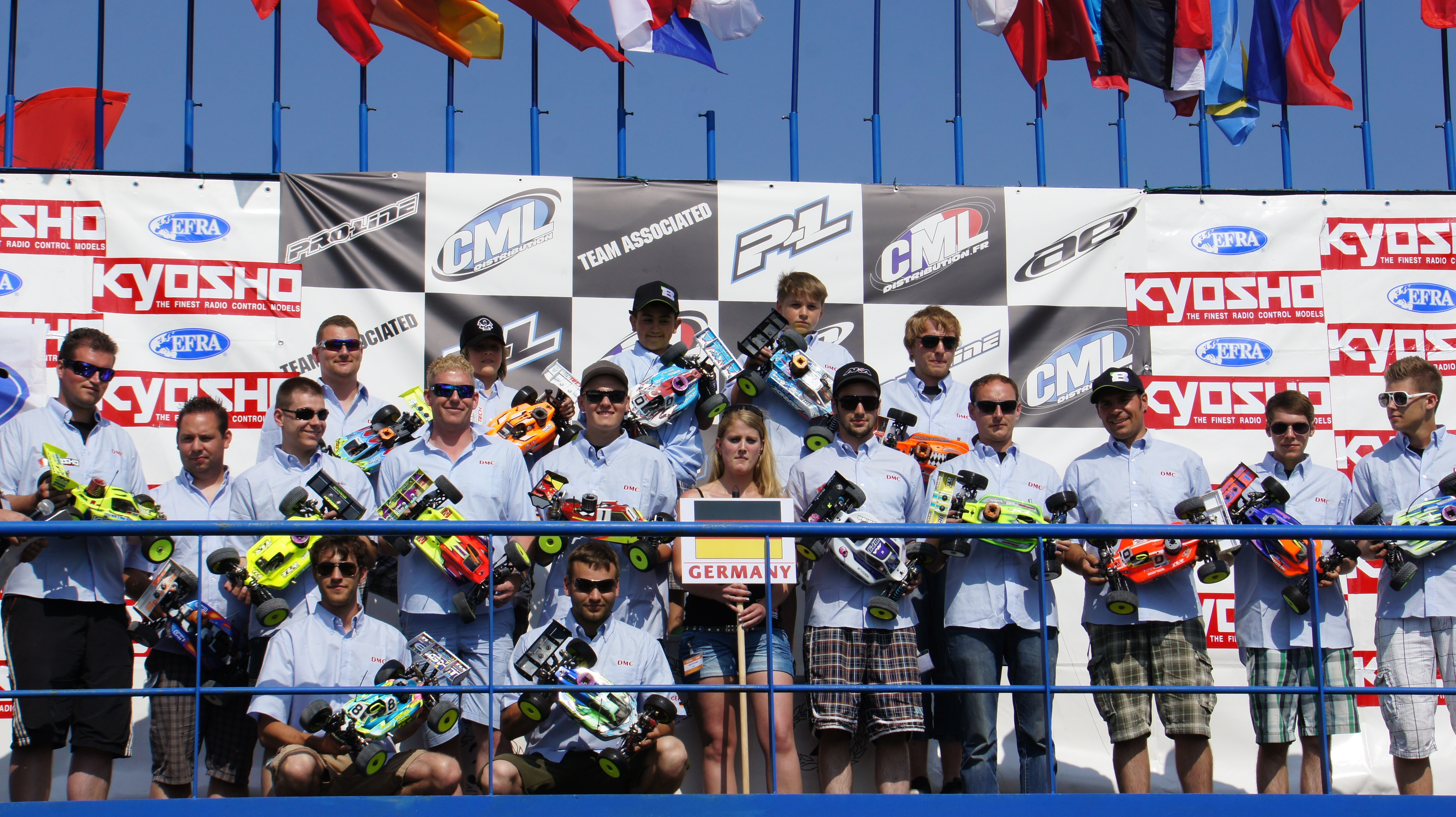
German Team at Rheims.

Member country, followed by the governing body is that country where known or applicable.

| Nation | Organisation | Abbreviation | Native spelling | Foundation |
|---|---|---|---|---|
| Austria | | OFMAV | Österreichische Funkmodellautoverband | 1978 |
| Belgium | | FBA | Federatie Belgische Automodelsport | |
| Bulgaria | Bulgarian Federation of Automodel Sports | BFAMS | Българска федерация по автомоделни спортове | |
| Croatia | | HAMS | Hrvatski Automodelarski Savez | |
| Czech Republic | RC Autoclub of Czech Republic | RCACR | RC Autoklub České republiky | |
| Denmark | Danish Automobile Sports Union | DASU | Dansk Automobil Sports Union | |
| Estonia | | EAMK | Eesti Automudelispordi Klubi | |
| Finland | AKK-Motorsport | | | |
| France | Federation Française de Voitures Radio Commandees | FFVRC | | 1975 |
| Germany | Deutscher Minicar Club | DMC | | 1971 |
| United Kingdom | British Radio Car Association | BRCA | | 1971 |
| Greece | Hellenic Modeling Federation | ELME | Ελληνική Μοντελιστική Ένωση | |
| Hungary | Hungarian Association of Modellers | MMSZ | Magyar Modellező Szövetség | |
| Ireland | Radio Controlled Car Association of Ireland | RCCAOI | | |
| Italy | Auto Model Sport Club Italiano | AMSCI | | |
| Luxembourg | Fédération Luxembourgeoise d'AutoModélisme Radio-Commandé | FLAMRC | | |
| Monaco | | FMM | Federation Monegasque de Modelisme | |
| Netherlands | | NOMAC | Nederlandse Organsatie Model Auto Clubs | |
| Norway | Norwegian Motorsport Federation | NMF | Norges Motorsportforbund | |
| Poland | | LOK | Stowarzyszenie BZG LOK | |
| Portugal | | FEPRA | Federação Portuguesa de Rádio Modelismo Automóvel | |
| Romania | | FRMd | Federația Română de Modelism | |
| Slovakia | Association of Slovakien Modelers | ZMOS | Zväz modelárov Slovenska | |
| Slovenia | Federation of Model Car Clubs of Slovenia | ZAMS | Zveza avtomodelarskih društev Slovenije | |
| Spain | Asociación Española de coches a Radiocontrol | AECAR | Asociación Española de coches a Radiocontrol | 1984 |
| Sweden | Svenska Bilsportförbundet | SBF | | |
| Switzerland | Swiss R/C Car Clubs Association | SRCCA | | 1976 |
| Turkey | Model Car Sport Association Turkey | MCSAT | Model Araba Sporları Derneği | |
| Ukraine | Ukrainian Federation of Automodel Sport | UFAS | Національна Українська Федерація Автомодельного Спорту | 1958 |
