= Commonwealth Taekwondo Championships =

Taekwondo competition

The Commonwealth Taekwondo Championships are held every two years, in every year the Commonwealth and Olympic Games are held. They are sanctioned by the Commonwealth Taekwondo Union, the Commonwealth Games Federation and the World Taekwondo Federation and involve world class competitors, making them a major event in Taekwondo.

== History ==
The first Commonwealth Taekwondo Championships were held in Brisbane, Queensland, on 14 and 15 October 2006. The host was Taekwondo Australia Inc.

In 2008, the 2nd Taekwondo Championships were held from November 21 to 23 at the MTS Center in Winnipeg, Manitoba, Canada.

The 3rd Commonwealth Taekwondo Championships were held in Brisbane, Australia and included:

- Sparring
- Poomsae
- Creative Poomsae

The award for the placings in the Commonwealth Taekwondo Championships are medals.

Taekwondo is now a Category 2 Commonwealth Games Sport and may feature in future Commonwealth Games.

| Year | Location |
|---|---|
| 2006 | Brisbane, Australia |
| 2008 | Winnipeg, Canada |
| 2011 | Chennai, India |
| 2014 | Edinburgh, Scotland |
| 2017 | Montreal, Canada |
