= Lee Kwan-Young =

South Korean taekwondoin (1946–2026)

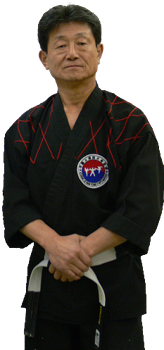
- Born: April 19, 1946; Seoul, Korea
- Died: October 18, 2026 (aged 80); Seoul, South Korea
- Nationality: South Korean
- Style: Hapkido, Taekwondo
- Rank: Grandmaster

Other information
- Occupation: Martial artist

Lee Kwan-young (Korean: 이관영; April 19, 1946 – October 18, 2026) was a South Korean military officer and taekwondoin. He was a pioneering martial artist, considered to be the "father of taekwondo" in France. Lee first introduced Taekwondo to France in 1968.

Lee died on October 18, 2026, at the age of 80.

== Honours ==
In 2019, the French Post Office created a stamp with his image to celebrate the 50th anniversary of the introduction of taekwondo in France.

On November 23, 2022, Lee was awarded the rank of Ordre national du Mérite.
