= Mothership (website) =

Singaporean media company

- Screenshot of Mothership.sg on 30 September 2024
- Website type: Digital media company
- Available in: English
- Headquarters: Singapore
- Owner: Bridgewater Holdings Pte Ltd
- Editor: Martino Tan
- Subsidiaries: Babelfish
- Website: mothership.sg
- Commercial: Yes
- Registration: None
- Launched: February 2014
- Current status: Active

Mothership is a digital media company that operates in Singapore. It was founded in August 2013 and its website officially launched in February 2014.

== History ==
Mothership was started in 2013 as a socio-political blog for young Singaporeans. The timing of its conception coincided with a period of political and social change in Singapore following the watershed elections of 2011. Mothership's "48 reasons why you still feel for Singapore" was published in August 2013 when the site was in beta. It crashed their servers for two hours after being shared widely.

In February 2014, the website was officially launched. It was funded by social enterprise Project Fishermen, which is chaired by former senior civil servant, Philip Yeo. Former foreign minister of Singapore, George Yeo, is its non-executive advisor.

On 2 April 2014, the website registered for a class license issued under the Broadcasting Act. After the Media Development Authority had introduced a new framework for websites with local news content in 2013, the website sought MDA for advice if it should be licensed under the framework as well. In 2015, the website was told by MDA that it met the threshold that requires the website to be registered. As part of the requirements, the website had to put up a S$50,000 performance bond.

In 2016, Mothership was incorporated as Bridgewater Holdings Pte Ltd. This was done to change its funding structure from being supported by a social enterprise to a fully commercial media business.

In 2017, Mothership rebranded itself.

In 2019, Mothership's application for press accreditation was approved by the Ministry of Communications and Information. This meant that it would have access to government information, news, and events. However, the press accreditation has been temporarily revoked, 6 months each, twice for breaking press embargo, once in 2022, and once in 2023.

In 2022, Mothership launched a creative space called "Matchbox".

== Reception ==
In 2021, the Reuters Institute for the Study of Journalism issued a Digital News Report, writing that Mothership was followed by 42% of Singapore's population.

In the 2023 edition of the study, Mothership emerged as the most used online news source in Singapore, surpassing mainstream competitors CNA and The Straits Times.

== Incidents ==
=== Plagiarism ===
In 2019, Mothership was caught copying content from Today without giving attribution. The content was amended to include an attribution and was subsequently removed.

=== Lin Lin ===
On 19 September 2023, Mothership reported on a Singapore-based Chinese influencer, Lin Lin, and misreported that she was a "tourist from China" when she had been living in Singapore for eight years and had been creating "helpful" content about life in Singapore. After the inaccurate article was published, Lin Lin became the subject of inappropriate comments, which she said was affecting her private life. Her private requests to Mothership for amendments were largely ignored. Mothership then changed its headline to replace "tourist" with "woman", which Lin Lin viewed as "a deliberate attempt at causing controversy". She publicly requested for Mothership to take down the "false content" and issue a public apology in a video rant, after which Mothership apologised in an editor's note on the article, and amended their article while taking down the accompanying Instagram post.

Subsequently, Mothership and Lin Lin published a public statement saying that Lin Lin has accepted Mothership's apology and hopes to move on from the matter.

=== Breaking of embargo ===
On 18 February 2022, Mothership published an infographic on the Goods and Services Tax hike ahead of a press embargo. As a result, the site had its government press accreditation suspended for six months after an appeal was submitted to the Ministry of Communications and Information, thus losing access to press conferences and media briefings held by government agencies.

On 29 September 2023, its government press accreditation was suspended for breaking embargo on an impending hike on water usage charges in Singapore, with a member of its editorial team breaching the safeguards put in place after the previous break of embargo. The suspension was lifted in March 2024.
