= Asian Taekwondo Union =

Taekwondo governing body

WT Asia
- Sport: Taekwondo
- Jurisdiction: Asian
- Abbreviation: ATU
- Affiliation: World Taekwondo

The Asian Taekwondo Union or WT Asia is the official governing body for Taekwondo in Asia as a regional organisation of World Taekwondo.
