= World Taekwondo =

International sport governing body

- 세계태권도연맹
- Abbreviation: WT
- Formation: 28 May 1973; 53 years ago
- Purpose: Martial art and sport
- Headquarters: Sejongdaero 55, Jung-gu, Seoul, South Korea; Lausanne, Switzerland
- Location: South Korea
- Region served: Worldwide
- Members: 215 + 1 national associations
- Official language: English, Korean, French and Spanish
- President: Choue Chung-won
- Affiliations: 17 July 1980; 46 years ago International Olympic Committee and 16 October 2013; 12 years ago International Paralympic Committee
- Website: worldtaekwondo.org

World Taekwondo (WT), formerly the World Taekwondo Federation (WTF), is an international federation governing the sport of taekwondo and para taekwondo. WT is a member of the Association of Summer Olympic International Federations (ASOIF).

The World Taekwondo Federation was established on 28 May 1973, at its inaugural meeting held at the Kukkiwon with participation of 35 representatives from around the world. As of May 2023 there are 213 member nations. Since 2004, Choue Chung-won has been the president of World Taekwondo, succeeding the first president, Kim Un-yong.

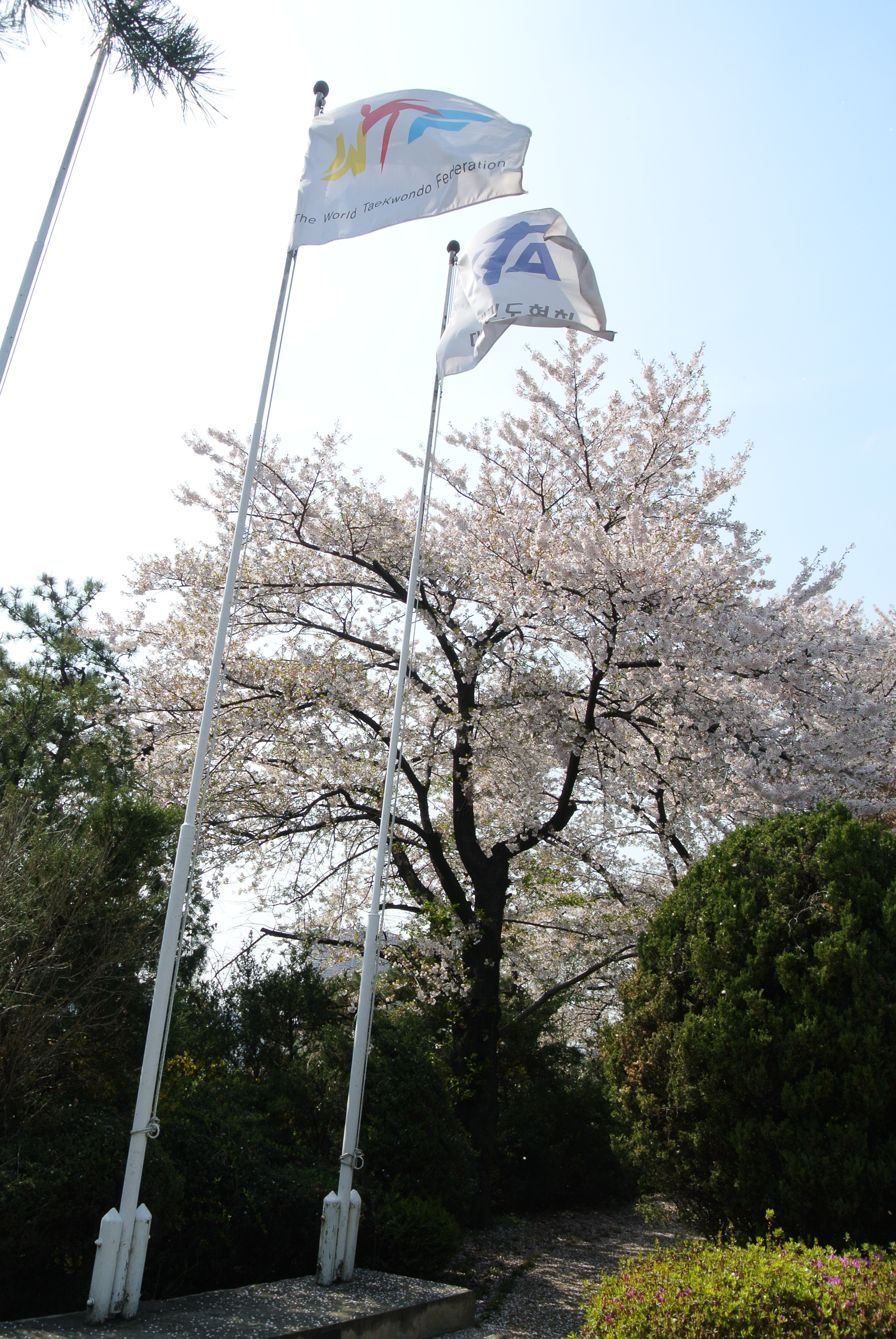
Flagpoles and flags of the World Taekwondo and of the Korean Taekwondo Association at the Kukkiwon in Seoul, South Korea

World Taekwondo was recognized by the International Paralympic Committee (IPC) on October 16, 2013, and the IPC later included taekwondo in the Tokyo 2020 Summer Paralympics. On 17 July 1980, the International Olympic Committee (IOC) recognized the World Taekwondo Federation at its 83rd Session in Moscow, Russia. Taekwondo debuted as a demonstration sport of the 1988 Summer Olympics in Seoul, South Korea. On 4 September 1994, Taekwondo was adopted as an official sport of the 2000 Summer Olympics at the 103rd IOC Session in Paris, France.

In June 2017, the World Taekwondo Federation was renamed as World Taekwondo to avoid its acronym clashing with the common Internet slang WTF.

== Organizational structure ==
Old WTF logo

The main constituents of World Taekwondo are the following: The General Assembly (GA); the World Taekwondo Council; the President and the Secretariat. In addition to its main constituents World Taekwondo also encompasses other organizations that have been duly authorized or recognized by the Council and the GA and that operate under the auspices of World Taekwondo.

World Taekwondo-recognized or authorized organizations include but are not limited to the Continental Unions. The General Assembly is the general meeting of the council and representatives of MNAs of World Taekwondo. The GA is World Taekwondo's supreme decision making organ. Its decisions are final, whereas the Council consists of the President, the Vice Presidents, the Secretary General, the Treasurer and the Council members. Responsibilities of the council are for example planning and management of World Taekwondo organization and operations and the control over the financial budget and financial reports. The President is elected by the GA from among its members for a term of four years. The President must lead and represent World Taekwondo; concurrently lead the GA and the council as its chairman, and preside over meetings and other activities as well as designate official duties to Vice Presidents on an ad-hoc basis for the betterment of the development of the sport of taekwondo and World Taekwondo operations. Furthermore, the President appoints the chairmen and members of World Taekwondo Committees. Lastly, the Secretariat of World Taekwondo is installed at the location of World Taekwondo headquarters for the execution of the secretarial affairs and duties of the President and the Secretary General.

== History ==
The World Taekwondo Federation (WTF) was established on May 28, 1973, at the inaugural meeting held at the Kukkiwon with participation of 35 representatives from the world after it separated from the International Taekwon-Do Federation because of political reasons. At that time, Un Yong Kim was elected president for a four-year term. One of the main Constituents of World Taekwondo, the Secretariat was formed on June 3, 1973, and began operating.

On October 8, 1974, World Taekwondo was affiliated to the General Association of International Sports Federations (GAISF), now SportAccord. Until the 1980s, the European (May, 1976), the Asian (October, 1976), the Pan American (September, 1978) and the African (April, 1979) Taekwondo Unions inaugural meetings were held, while Oceania's Taekwondo Union was not recognized as the 5th Continental Union of World Taekwondo until July 16, 2005.

The recognition of the IOC towards World Taekwondo at its 83rd session in Moscow on July 17, 1980, was the cornerstone for their Cooperation. Thereupon Taekwondo participated in the 24th Olympiad at Changchung Gymnasium in Seoul, Korea as well as the 25th Olympiad at the Palau Blaugrana in Barcelona, Spain as a demonstration sport.

In recognition of his contribution to the Olympic Movement Un Yong Kim was awarded the Order of Commander by Prince Rainier of Monaco on September 21, 1993. Moreover, Taekwondo was adopted as an official sport of the 2000 Summer Olympics at the 103rd IOC session in Paris, France, on September 4, 1994. Half a year later, on February 15, 1995, World Taekwondo was affiliated with the Association of Summer Olympic International Federations (ASOIF) as a provisional member.

After the first appearance of Taekwondo as an Olympic Sport in the 2000 Summer Olympics, the IOC executive board confirms Taekwondo as an Olympic Sport for the 2004 Summer Olympics on December 11–13, 2000. Furthermore, the inclusion of taekwondo in the 2008 Summer Olympics was confirmed on November 29, 2002, at the 114th IOC session held in Mexico City.

On February 15, 2004, the Vice President (Italy) Sun Jae Park was elected as Acting President of World Taekwondo due to the resignation of the founding President Un Yong Kim from the presidency of World Taekwondo. Four month later Chung Won Choue was elected as new President of World Taekwondo at the extraordinary General Assembly on June 11, 2004. Taekwondo was confirmed as program of the 2012 Summer Olympics on July 8, 2005.

In June 2017, the body was renamed World Taekwondo to avoid the "negative connotations" of the acronym associated with the common Internet slang WTF.

== Mission and objectives ==
The mission of World Taekwondo is to provide effective international governance of taekwondo as an Olympic sport and Paralympic sport. The envisioned objectives of World Taekwondo are to promote, expand, and improve worldwide the practice of taekwondo in light of its educational, cultural, and sports values (the "Taekwondo movement") and to promote fair play, youth development, and education as well as to encourage peace and cooperation though participation in sports. Moreover, World Taekwondo wants to promote or sanction international taekwondo competitions and relating to those World Taekwondo resolves to constantly improve technical rules regulating taekwondo competitions and poomsae competitions sanctioned or promoted by World Taekwondo, including the taekwondo event of the Olympic Games and Paralympic Games. Furthermore, World Taekwondo wants to take action in order to strengthen the unity and protect the interests of World Taekwondo and the Taekwondo Movement as well as to engage in other activities in support of the above objectives. World Taekwondo undertakes its missions and objectives in cooperation with independent affiliated organizations including World Taekwondo Academy, World Taekwondo Peace Corps, World Taekwondo Demonstration Team, Pro Taekwondo Federation, Global Taekwondo Support Federation, and Taekwondo International Federation.

== Membership ==
As of 2026, the global membership of World Taekwondo stands at 215 national member associations (NMAs, 214 active and 1 suspended), spanning five Continental Unions (CUs).

=== Continental Unions (CUs) ===
- African Taekwondo Union (AFTU) – 54 national member associations
- Asian Taekwondo Union (ATU) – 44 national member associations
- European Taekwondo Union (ETU) – 52 national member associations
- Oceania Taekwondo Union (OTU) – 19 member national associations
- Pan American Taekwondo Union (PATU) – 46 national member associations

=== National Member Associations (NMAs) ===
List of National Member Associations (NMAs) of World Taekwondo
Region	Governing body	CU	Year of affiliation
Algeria	Algerian Taekwondo Federation	AFTU	2004
Angola	Federação Angolana de Taekwondo	AFTU	2001
Benin	Fédération Béninoise de Taekwondo	AFTU	1978
Botswana	Botswana Taekwondo Federation	AFTU	2012
Burkina Faso	Fédération Burkinabé de Taekwondo	AFTU	1981
Burundi	Fédération Burundaise de Taekwondo	AFTU	2010
Cameroon	Federation Camerounaise de Taekwondo	AFTU	2002
Cape Verde	Associação de Taekwondo de Cabo-Verde	AFTU	2000
Central African Republic	Fédération Centrafricaine de Taekwondo	AFTU	1999
Chad	Fédération Tchadienne de Taekwondo	AFTU	2000
Comoros	Fédération Comorienne de Taekwondo	AFTU	2003
Congo	Fédération Congolaise de Taekwondo	AFTU	1993
Democratic Republic of the Congo	Fédération Congolaise de Tae Kwon Do	AFTU	2005
Djibouti	Fédération Djiboutienne de Taekwondo	AFTU	2016
Egypt	Egyptian Taekwondo Federation	AFTU	1979
Equatorial Guinea	Federación Ecuatoguineana de Taekwondo	AFTU	1997
Eswatini	Eswatini Taekwondo Federation	AFTU	1985
Ethiopia	Ethiopian Taekwondo Federation	AFTU	2003
Gabon	Fédération Gabonaise de Taekwondo	AFTU	1978
Gambia	Gambia Taekwondo Association	AFTU	2007
Ghana	Ghana Taekwondo Federation	AFTU	1981
Guinea	Fédération Guinéenne de Taekwondo	AFTU	2001
Guinea-Bissau	Federação de Taekwondo da Guiné-Bissau	AFTU	2017
Ivory Coast	Fédération Ivoirienne de Taekwondo	AFTU	1975
Kenya	Kenya Taekwondo Federation	AFTU	1990
Lesotho	Lesotho Taekwondo Association	AFTU	1990
Liberia	Liberia Taekwondo Federation	AFTU	2001
Libya	Libyan Taekwondo Federation	AFTU	1979
Madagascar	Fédération Malagasy de Taekwondo	AFTU	1993
Malawi	Taekwondo Association of Malawi	AFTU	2007
Mali	Fédération Malienne de Taekwondo	AFTU	2000
Mauritania	Mauritanian Taekwondo Federation	AFTU	2014
Mauritius	Mauritius Taekwondo Association	AFTU	1978
Morocco	Fédération royale marocaine de taekwondo	AFTU	1981
Mozambique	Federação Moçambicana de Taekwondo	AFTU	2005
Namibia	Namibia Taekwondo Federation	AFTU	2023
Niger	Fédération Nigérienne de Taekwondo	AFTU	1999
Nigeria	Nigeria Taekwondo Federation	AFTU	1988
Rwanda	Rwanda Taekwondo Federation	AFTU	2011
São Tomé and Príncipe	São Tomé and Príncipe Taekwondo Federation	AFTU	2004
Senegal	Fédération Sénégalaise de Taekwondo	AFTU	1995
Seychelles	Seychelles Taekwondo Association	AFTU	2012
Sierra Leone	Sierra Leone Taekwondo Association	AFTU	2012
Somalia	Somalia Taekwondo Federation	AFTU	2007
South Africa	South African Taekwondo Federation	AFTU	1991
South Sudan	South Sudan Taekwondo Federation	AFTU	2012
Sudan	Sudanese Taekwondo Federation	AFTU	2003
Togo	Fédération Togolaise de Taekwondo	AFTU	1996
Tunisia	Tunisia Taekwondo Federation	AFTU	1978
Uganda	Uganda Taekwondo Federation	AFTU	2007
Tanzania	Tanzania Taekwondo Federation	AFTU	2003
Zambia	Zambia Taekwondo Federation	AFTU	2006
Zimbabwe	Zimbabwe Taekwondo Association	AFTU	1997
Afghanistan	Afghanistan National Taekwondo Federation	ATU	1993
Bahrain	Bahrain Taekwondo Federation	ATU	1977
Bangladesh	Bangladesh Taekwondo Federation	ATU	1999
Bhutan	Bhutan Taekwondo Federation	ATU	1985
Brunei	Brunei Darussalam Taekwondo Association	ATU	1973
Cambodia	Cambodian Taekwondo Federation	ATU	1995
China	Chinese Taekwondo Association	ATU	1995
Hong Kong, China	Hong Kong, China Taekwondo Association	ATU	1978
India	India Taekwondo	ATU	1979
Indonesia	Indonesian Taekwondo Association	ATU	1975
Iraq	Iraqi Taekwondo Federation	ATU	1984
Iran	Islamic Republic of Iran Taekwondo Federation	ATU	1975
Japan	All Japan Taekwondo Association	ATU	1981
Jordan	Jordan Taekwondo Federation	ATU	1979
Kazakhstan	Kazakhstan Taekwondo Federation	ATU	1993
Kuwait	Kuwait Taekwondo Federation	ATU	1977
Kyrgyzstan	Taekwondo Association of the Kyrgyz Republic	ATU	1993
Laos	Lao Taekwondo Federation	ATU	1996
Lebanon	Lebanese Taekwondo Federation	ATU	1978
Macau, China	Macau Taekwondo Association	ATU	2002
Malaysia	Taekwondo Malaysia	ATU	1975
Maldives	Maldives Taekwondo	ATU	2022
Mongolia	Mongolia Taekwondo Federation	ATU	1991
Myanmar	Myanmar Taekwondo Federation	ATU	1990
Nepal	Nepal Taekwondo Association	ATU	1983
Oman	Oman Taekwondo Committee	ATU	2010
Pakistan	Pakistan Taekwondo Federation	ATU	1977
Palestine	Palestine Taekwondo Federation	ATU	1989
Philippines	Philippine Taekwondo Association	ATU	1973
Qatar	Qatar Taekwondo, Judo & Karate Federation	ATU	1977
Saudi Arabia	Saudi Arabian Taekwondo Federation	ATU	1977
Singapore	Singapore Taekwondo Federation	ATU	1975
South Korea	Korea Taekwondo Association	ATU	1973
Sri Lanka	Sri Lanka Taekwondo Federation	ATU	1983
Syria	Syrian Arab Taekwondo Federation	ATU	2000
Chinese Taipei	Chinese Taipei Taekwondo Association	ATU	1973
Tajikistan	Taekwondo Federation of the Republic of Tajikistan	ATU	1995
Thailand	Taekwondo Association of Thailand	ATU	1975
Timor-Leste	Timor Leste Taekwondo Federation	ATU	2009
Turkmenistan	National Taekwondo Centre of Turkmenistan	ATU	2000
United Arab Emirates	U.A.E. Taekwondo Federation	ATU	1994
Uzbekistan	Uzbekistan Taekwondo Association	ATU	1992
Vietnam	Vietnam Taekwondo Federation	ATU	1989
Yemen	Yemen Taekwondo Federation	ATU	1988
Albania	Albanian Taekwondo Federation	ETU	1995
Andorra	Federació Andorrana de Taekwondo	ETU	1987
Armenia	Armenian Taekwondo Federation	ETU	1996
Austria	Austrian Taekwondo Federation	ETU	1973
Azerbaijan	Azerbaijan Taekwondo Federation	ETU	1995
Belarus	Belarusian Taekwondo Federation	ETU	1992
Belgium	Belgian Taekwondo Federation	ETU	1975
Bosnia and Herzegovina	Taekwondo Federation of Bosnia and Herzegovina	ETU	1993
Bulgaria	Bulgarian Taekwondo Federation	ETU	1990
Croatia	Croatian Taekwondo Federation	ETU	1992
Cyprus	Cyprus Taekwondo Federation	ETU	1982
Czech Republic	World Taekwondo Czech Republic	ETU	1995
Denmark	Danish Taekwondo Federation	ETU	1975
Estonia	Estonian Taekwondo WT Federation	ETU	1998
Faroe Islands	Faroe Islands Taekwondo Federation	ETU	2019
Finland	Finnish Taekwondo Federation	ETU	1979
France	French Federation of Taekwondo and Related Disciplines	ETU	1975
Georgia	Georgian Taekwondo Federation	ETU	1995
Germany	German Taekwondo Union	ETU	1973
Great Britain	British Taekwondo	ETU	1977
Greece	World Taekwondo Greece	ETU	1978
Hungary	Hungarian Taekwondo Federation	ETU	1989
Iceland	Icelandic Taekwondo Federation	ETU	1991
Ireland	Taekwondo Ireland	ETU	1983
Isle of Man	Isle of Man Taekwondo Association	ETU	2006
Israel	Israel Taekwondo Federation	ETU	1981
Italy	Italian Taekwondo Federation	ETU	1977
Kosovo	Kosovo Taekwondo Federation	ETU	2013
Latvia	Latvian Taekwondo Federation	ETU	1992
Lithuania	Lithuanian Taekwondo Federation	ETU	1992
Luxembourg	Luxembourg Taekwondo Federation	ETU	1993
Malta	Malta Taekwondo Association	ETU	1995
Moldova	Federation of Taekwondo of the Republic of Moldova	ETU	1995
Monaco	Fédération Monégasque de Taekwondo	ETU	1996
Montenegro	Taekwondo Association of Montenegro	ETU	2007
Netherlands	Taekwondo Bond Nederland	ETU	1976
North Macedonia	Macedonian Taekwondo Federation	ETU	2001
Norway	Norwegian Martial Arts Federation	ETU	1977
Poland	Polski Zwiazek Taekwondo	ETU	1979
Portugal	Federação Portugal Taekwondo	ETU	1976
Romania	Federaţia Română de Taekwondo	ETU	1991
Russia	Russian Taekwondo Union	ETU	1991
San Marino	Federazione Sammarinese Arti Marziali	ETU	1994
Serbia	Tekvondo Asocijacija Srbije	ETU	1975
Slovakia	Slovenská Asociácia Taekwondo WT	ETU	1994
Slovenia	Slovenian Taekwondo Association	ETU	1993
Spain	Federación Española de Taekwondo	ETU	1975
Sweden	Swedish Taekwondo Union	ETU	1977
Switzerland	Swiss Taekwondo	ETU	1977
Turkey	Turkey Taekwondo Federation	ETU	1975
Ukraine	Ukraine Taekwondo Federation	ETU	1993
Vatican City	Vatican Taekwondo	ETU	2021
American Samoa	American Samoa Taekwondo Federation	OTU	2007
Australia	Australian Taekwondo	OTU	1975
Cook Islands	Cook Islands Taekwondo Federation	OTU	2011
Federated States of Micronesia	Federated States of Micronesia Taekwondo Association	OTU	2011
Fiji	Fiji Taekwondo Association	OTU	1983
French Polynesia	Polynesia Taekwondo	OTU	1975
Guam	Guam Taekwondo Federation	OTU	1986
Kiribati	Kiribati Taekwondo Association	OTU	2006
Marshall Islands	Marshall Islands Taekwondo Federation	OTU	2007
Nauru	Nauru Taekwondo Association	OTU	2011
New Caledonia	Ligue de Taekwondo Nouvelle Calédonie	OTU	2010
New Zealand	Taekwondo New Zealand	OTU	1975
Palau	Palau Taekwondo Federation	OTU	2011
Papua New Guinea	Papua New Guinea Taekwondo Federation	OTU	2003
Samoa	Samoa Taekwondo Federation	OTU	1997
Solomon Islands	Solomon Islands Taekwondo Union	OTU	1999
Tonga	Tonga National Taekwondo Association	OTU	2001
Tuvalu	Tuvalu Taekwondo Association	OTU	2011
Vanuatu	Vanuatu Taekwondo Association	OTU	2004
Antigua and Barbuda	Antigua and Barbuda Taekwondo Association	PATU	1998
Argentina	Confederación Argentina de Taekwondo	PATU	1976
Aruba	Aruba Taekwondo Association	PATU	1992
Bahamas	Bahamas Taekwondo Federation	PATU	1997
Barbados	Taekwondo Association of Barbados	PATU	1986
Belize	Belize Taekwondo Federation	PATU	1997
Bermuda	Bermuda Taekwondo Association	PATU	1983
Bolivia	Federación Boliviana de Taekwondo	PATU	1977
Brazil	Confederação Brasileira de Taekwondo	PATU	1975
Canada	Taekwondo Canada	PATU	1975
Cayman Islands	Cayman Islands Taekwondo Federation	PATU	1989
Chile	Federación Chilena de Taekwondo	PATU	1989
Colombia	Federación Colombiana de Taekwondo	PATU	1976
Costa Rica	Federación Costarricense de Taekwondo	PATU	1984
Cuba	Federación Cubana de Taekwondo	PATU	1993
Curaçao	Curaçao Taekwondo Federation	PATU	2012
Dominica	Dominica Taekwondo Association	PATU	1999
Dominican Republic	Dominican Republic Taekwondo Federation	PATU	1983
Ecuador	Federación Ecuatoriana de Taekwondo	PATU	1973
El Salvador	Federación Salvadoreña de Taekwondo	PATU	1987
French Guiana	French Guiana Taekwondo League	PATU	2016
Grenada	Grenada Taekwondo Association	PATU	1995
Guadeloupe	Guadeloupe Taekwondo Association	PATU	2011
Guatemala	Guatemalan Taekwondo Federation	PATU	1991
Guyana	Guyana Taekwondo Association	PATU	1995
Haiti	Fédération Haïtienne de Taekwondo	PATU	1992
Honduras	Federación Nacional de Taekwondo de Honduras	PATU	1979
Jamaica	World Korean Taekwondo Jamaica	PATU	1977
Martinique	Ligue Martinique Taekwondo	PATU	2011
Mexico	Federación Mexicana de Taekwondo	PATU	1973
Nicaragua	Federación de Taekwondo de Nicaragua	PATU	1991
Panama	Federación Panameña de Taekwondo	PATU	1989
Paraguay	Confederación Paraguaya de Taekwondo	PATU	1982
Peru	Federación Deportiva Peruana de Taekwondo	PATU	1977
Puerto Rico	Federación de Taekwondo de Puerto Rico	PATU	1977
Saint Kitts and Nevis	Saint Kitts and Nevis Taekwondo Federation	PATU	1998
Saint Lucia	Saint Lucia Taekwondo Federation	PATU	1998
Saint Pierre and Miquelon	Saint Pierre and Miquelon Taekwondo Regional Committee	PATU	2025
Saint Vincent and the Grenadines	St. Vincent and the Grenadines Taekwondo Association	PATU	1992
Suriname	Surinaamse Taekwondo Associatie	PATU	1977
Trinidad and Tobago	Trinidad and Tobago Taekwondo Association	PATU	1983
United States	USA Taekwondo	PATU	1975
Uruguay	Uruguayan Taekwondo Federation	PATU	1990
Venezuela	Federación Venezolana de Taekwondo	PATU	1976
Virgin Islands, British	British Virgin Islands Taekwondo Federation	PATU	1998
Virgin Islands, U.S.	Virgin Islands Taekwondo Federation	PATU	1981
Réunion	Reunion Taekwondo Association	AFTU	2025

== Sparring ==
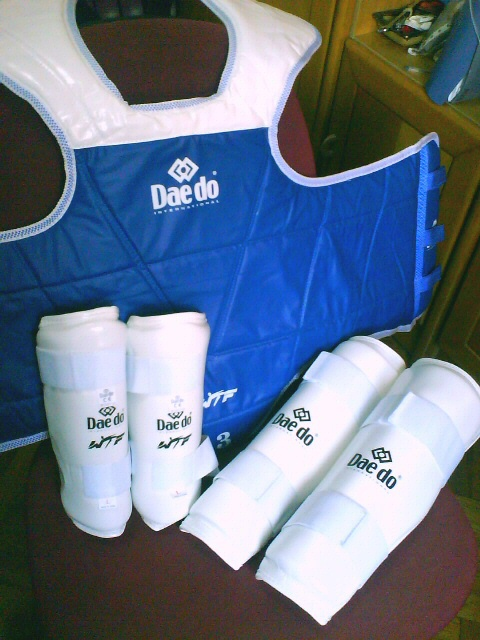
Official World Taekwondo trunk protector (hogu), forearm guards and shin guards

Under World Taekwondo and Olympic rules, sparring is a full-contact event and takes place between two competitors on a matted 8 meter octagon.

Scoring of valid points is determined by using the electronic scoring system installed in what World Taekwondo designates as "Protector and Scoring Systems" (PSS). In events where the PSS are used, all scoring is determined by judges using manual scoring devices.

There are now two alternate forms of contest.

=== Standard form ===
At the end of three rounds, the athlete with the most points is declared the winner. A tie, however, results in an additional round, known as "Golden Point". If no point is scored during the Golden Point, the player with the most registers on the PSS is declared the winner. If one athlete is knocked out, or is otherwise unable to continue as a result of a legal technique by his opponent, the other athlete is automatically awarded the victory.

=== Best of three system ===
In the best of three system, the duration of the contest comprises three rounds of two minutes each. The contestant with the most number of points per round wins the round. The winning contestant is the one who wins the most number of rounds out of three.

=== Points ===
Points are awarded for permitted, accurate, and powerful techniques to the legal scoring areas; light contact does not score any points. Points are awarded as follows:

- 1 point for a strike to the chest or when "Gam-jeom" is given to the opponent
- 2 points for a standard kick to the chest
- 3 points for a standard kick to the head
- 4 points for a turning kick to the chest
- 6 points for a turning kick to the head (since 2026, 5 points until 2025)

The competition sparring rules were updated by World Taekwondo General Assembly in November 2016 in order to upgrade the sport so that it "dazzles and excites." Changes include encouraging more offensive actions with modifications to some of the point scoring and by disallowing certain leg blocks, elimination of mid-game interruptions, and improvements that simplify penalty assessment and foster better officiating. These new rules took effect in January 2017.

Beginning in 2009, a kick or punch that makes contact with the opponent's hogu (the body guard that functions as a scoring target) scores one point; if a kick to the hogu involved a technique that includes fully turning the attacking competitor's body, so that the back is fully exposed to the targeted competitor during execution of the technique (spinning kick), an additional point is awarded; a kick to the head scores three points; as of October 2010 an additional point is awarded if a turning kick was used to execute this attack. Punches to the head are not allowed. As of March 2010, no additional points are awarded for knocking down an opponent (beyond the normal points awarded for legal strikes).

The referee can give penalties (called "gam-jeom") at any time for rule-breaking, such as hitting an area not recognized as a target, falling, or stalling the match.

Until 2008, if one competitor gained a 7-point lead over the other, or if one competitor reached a total of 12 points, then that competitor was immediately declared the winner and the match ended. These rules were abolished by World Taekwondo at the start of 2009. In October 2010 World Taekwondo reintroduced a point gap rule. Under the new rule if a competitor has a 12-point lead at the end of the second round or achieves a 12-point lead at any point in the third round then the match is over and the athlete in the lead is declared the winner.

World Taekwondo-sanctioned events allow any person, regardless of school affiliation or martial arts style, to compete in World Taekwondo events as long as he or she is a member of World Taekwondo Member National Association in his or her nation. These National Associations are open for anyone to join.

=== WT World Ranking ===
As of the rules established in 2017, it has been arranged a new grading for competitions that will award points to the best placed athletes. Previously the maximum was G10, now it was doubled to G20. The "G" value of a tournament is used to calculate how many points an athlete is awarded for winning a tournament. For example, the Olympics as a G-20 tournament is worth five times as many points to the athlete as a Continental Championship (a G-4 tournament). To compete on a WT Ranking-Points Competition the athletes need a Global License, which allows them to secure points on any country that hosts a tournament and it's affiliated with WT.

Grade	Competition
G1	WT Sanctioned tournaments
G1	World University Championships
G1	Multi-Sport Games
G1	World Military Championships
G2	WT Sanctioned tournaments
G2	Universiade
G2	Military World Games
G4	Grand Prix Series
G4	Continental Championships
G4	Continental Multi-Sport Games (with 4-year cycle)
G8	Grand Prix Final
G14	World Taekwondo Championships
G20	Summer Olympics

The points awarded to the athletes are given within the following formula:

- Rank of Athlete within the tournament x Grade of Tournament

Where, generally, excluding the Summer Olympics where players tie at the same place due to the repechages:

- The first-place athlete is said to have a "rank" of 10 within the tournament
- The second-place athlete is said to have a rank of 6 within the tournament (60% of first-place)
- The third-place athlete is said to have a rank of 3.6 within the tournament (60% of second-place)
- The fourth-place athlete is said to have a rank of 2.16 within the tournament (60% of third-place)

Thereafter (generally) the percentage used is 70% rather than 60%

Example:

An athlete places 3rd at a G-8 event. Then the athlete is awarded:

(10 points x 60% x 60%) x 8 = 28.8 points.

=== Attrition of Athlete Points ===
When an athlete is awarded points at a Ranking-Point Tournament, those points remain attached to that athlete for four years. During a four-year period, points are deducted from the athletes rank after each completed year by 25% of the initial points.
