= Stahlberg Models =

Stahlberg was a Finnish company producing promotional plastic model cars mainly of Swedish Saab and Volvo automobiles usually in scales between 1:18 and 1:25. Stahlberg mainly molded cars from the 1960s to about 1992, though its modern counterpart, Emek continues to make truck models.

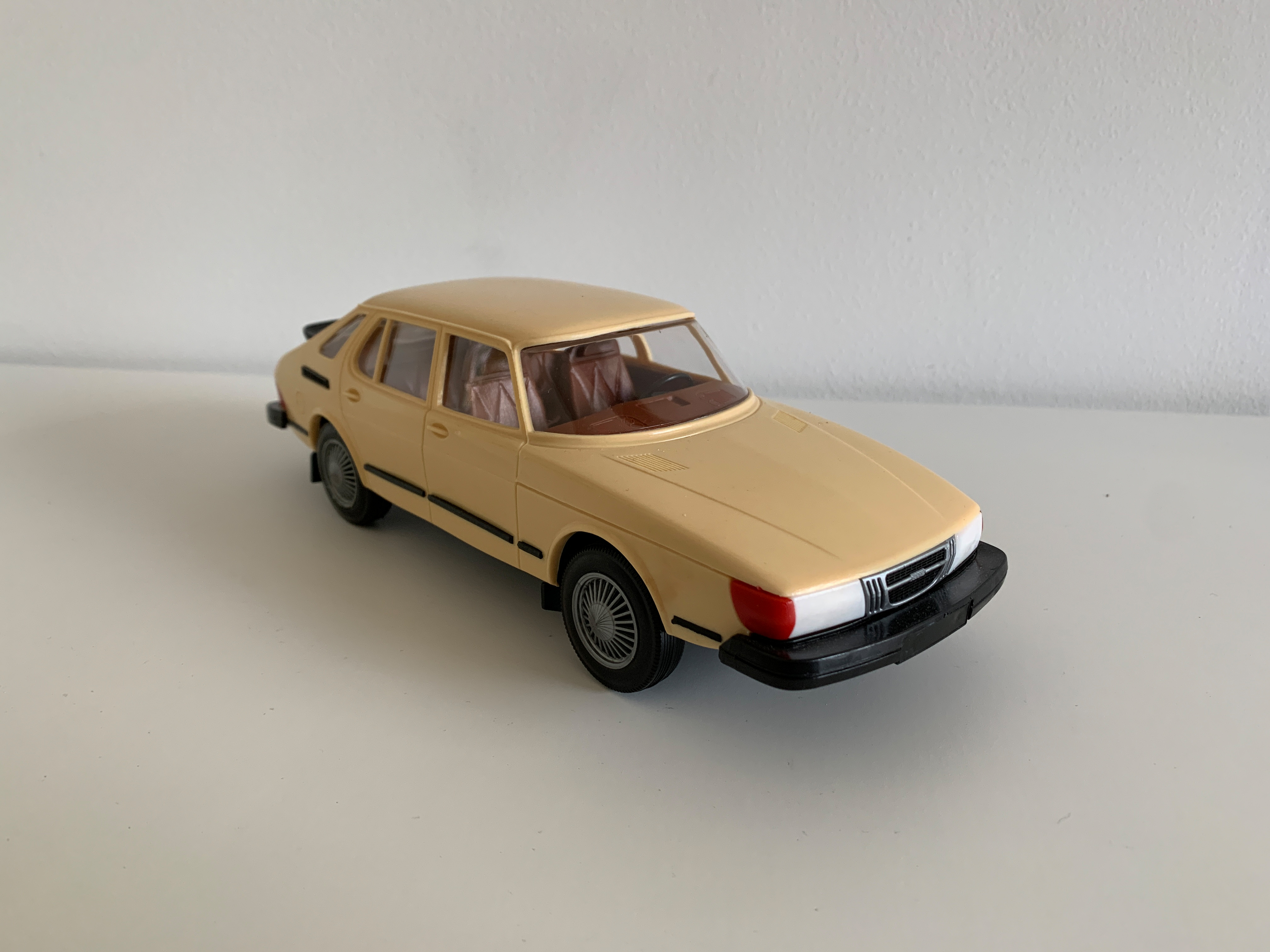
SAAB 900

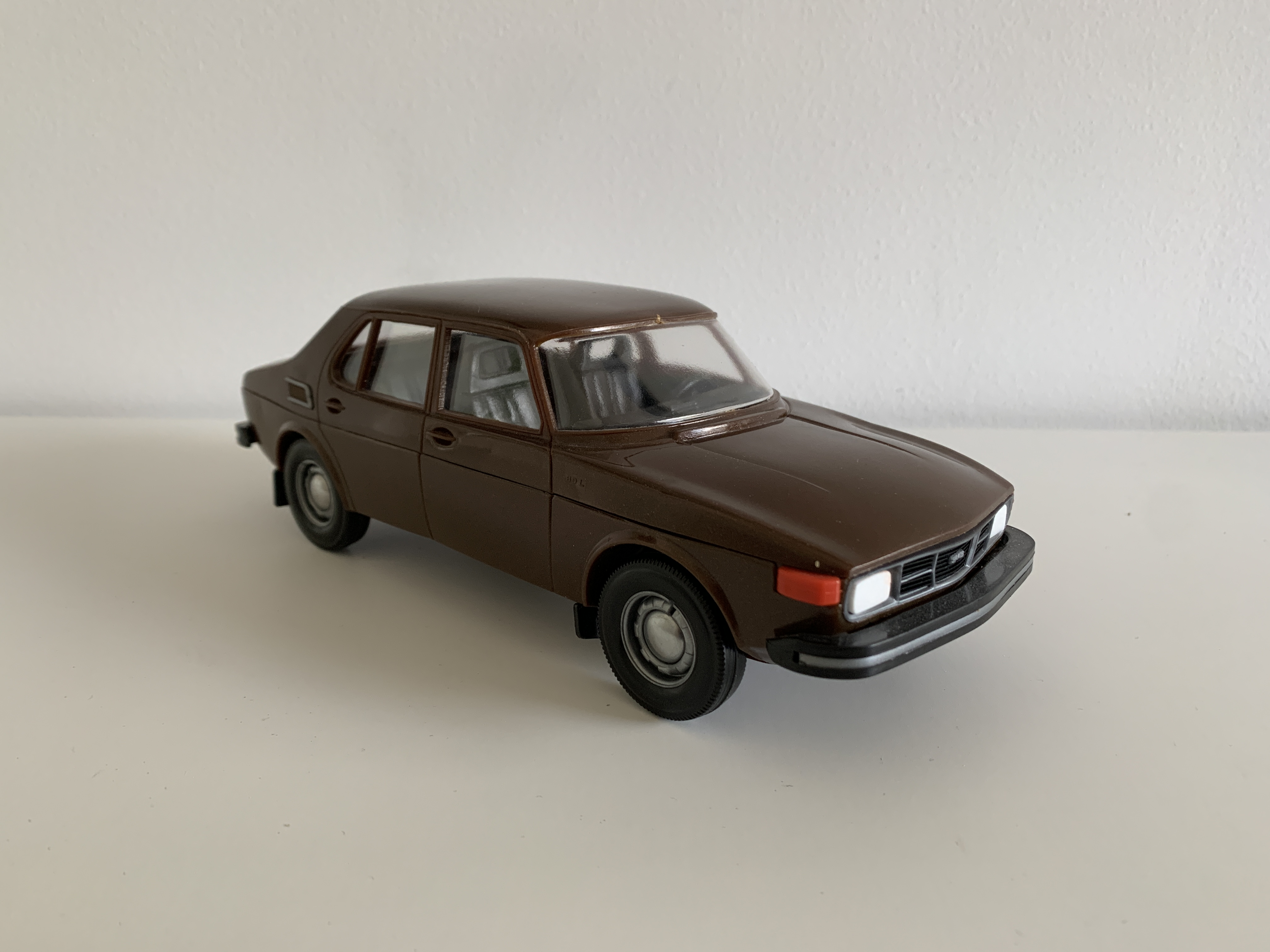
SAAB 99

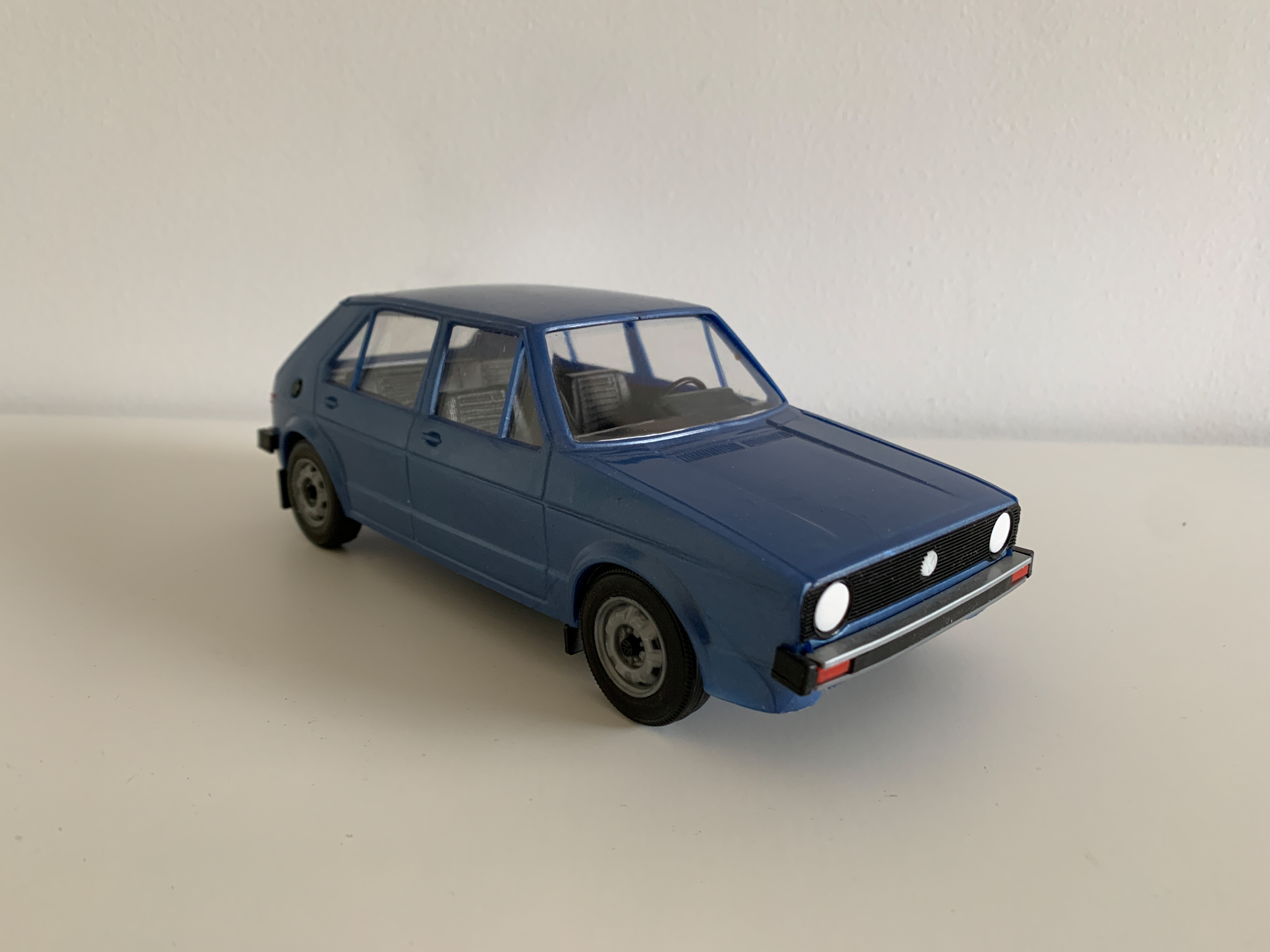
Volkswagen Golf I

Other Finnish companies producing similar sized plastic models were Aren, Emek Muovi, Ju Ju, Hot Toys, KMS Myynti, Muovo, Nyrhinen Ky, and Plasto.

== Volvos and Saabs ==
Stahlberg vehicles were pre-assembled promotional models. Available mainly through car dealerships in Europe and the U.S., models were produced from about 1965 to about 1990. Usually Stahlbergs were packaged in a clear plastic bag (poly-bagged), though later models did come in blue and white boxes. One writer reminisces that when at the Volvo dealer with his father as a child, he remembers the models often would be "hanging on the pegboard behind the service desk".

Some standard Swedish models produced by Stahlberg were the Volvo 120–122 series (Amazon)*1, 142 series, 164 series, 200 series, 700 series, and 66 / 300 series (DAFs). Saabs produced were Saab 99, 900 series, and 9000 series. Models were produced in 2-door, 4-door, and station wagon versions. Some models from earlier years are now getting rather hard to find, like the 144 sedan from the late 1960s which featured a bit better detail than later models and 'knobbier' tread tires. These early Volvos like the 164 or the SAAB 99 had lovely two piece wheels with unpainted rims and the silver hubs. Later wheels were accurate single cast copies of the actual designs.

*1 Stahlberg did not produce the Volvo Amazon. It arrived in the mid 80s under the Ju Ju brand. It is made in Estonia. The detail is not as good as the other cars and the scale is not 1:22. Closer to 1:18. So these cars were not made during the big cars were in production, like the other ones.

The production of the test model Volvo 142 (scale 1:36) started later than 1965, probably more like 1969/70. The first 142 in scale 1:22 is from 1970 and 1971 with the new front, and the 164 is from 1972.

== Details and model variety ==
Older Stahlbergs from the 1970s were cast in a solid color plastic while later ones had a metallic effect along with swirls and streaks in the plastic.

The most common scale of models was 1:22 (about 9 inches long), however 1:32 (about 5 inches long), 1:25, 1:18, and a larger 1:12 scale (about 18 inches long) were also produced.

Though Volvo and Saab were the most common Stahlberg clients, a perusal of eBay and other websites shows a few other vehicles were also contracted and appear to have been promotional in nature. One example was the 1979 Mercedes-Benz 300 Touring (station wagon). Others were a Volkswagen Golf sedan, Saab 600, Lancia Delta in rally and non-rally form, and a 1978 DAF Volvo 66 (the Dutch car maker purchased by Volvo). Reportedly, there was also a Saab Sonett, a few other Golfs, and some Toyotas, like the Corolla DX. The Saab 99 and 900 were also produced in police ("polis") versions and some of the Volvo wagons were made in ambulance/medical assistance versions with red crosses on their sides and hoods.

Stahlberg made some of its Volvo and Saab models in slightly brighter toy-like colors for the British distributor, O. G. Plasto. These were packaged in colorful boxes.

== European promotionals ==
While other European car makers preferred the manufacturing of promotional models made out of diecast zamac in 1:43 OR 1:35 scale, it seems Finnish companies were unique in Europe by producing – often promotional models – in larger scales and in plastic. Both of these traits were similar to American promotional model companies like AMT, PMC, MPC, or Jo-Han. Stahlberg was the most well known of these Scandinavian large scale promotional model producers for cars through the 1980s, whereas Finnish Emek Muovi was known for trucks. Nyrhinen Ky was another similar Finnish producer that made VWs and Toyotas, though it is uncertain if these were made specifically as promotionals, and uncertain if they were Stahlberg tooling.

Stahlbergs were produced in a softer, somewhat more flexible, polyurethane plastic than the harder polystyrene of traditional American promotional models. Thus, Stahlbergs are prone to fewer cracks and breaks, yet are easier to scratch – similar to other toy vehicles made in softer plastics. Models are molded in various colors and unpainted. Streaks of darker or lighter color are commonly found through the plastic.

Models include precise replication of proportions and detail of actual vehicles, including accurate moldings, logos, and name scripts. Tires are not rubber, but are made of the same type of plastic as body and chassis, though black with accurately cast wheels. Models often have mud flaps behind rear wheels that swing (and are often are lost from play). Rather odd, and rarely seen on other miniatures of any type, are headlights often molded in white plastic as opposed to clear lenses. This may be the single most recognizable trait of the brand.

Interior and chassis detail is often simpler than seen in US promotionals. Chassis usually have no detail, are plain, and simply say "Made in Finland", but some carry promotional advertising statements relating to the real car, like "Exceptional roadholding", "High standard of safety", or "Swedish quality".

== Stahlberg today ==
Models can frequently be found on eBay and are popular sellers, commanding anywhere from US$30 to US$100. Around 1977, in honor of Volvo's 50th Anniversary, Stahlberg produced a 1927 Volvo OV4 Jakob plastic model for dealers, produced in 1:20 scale.

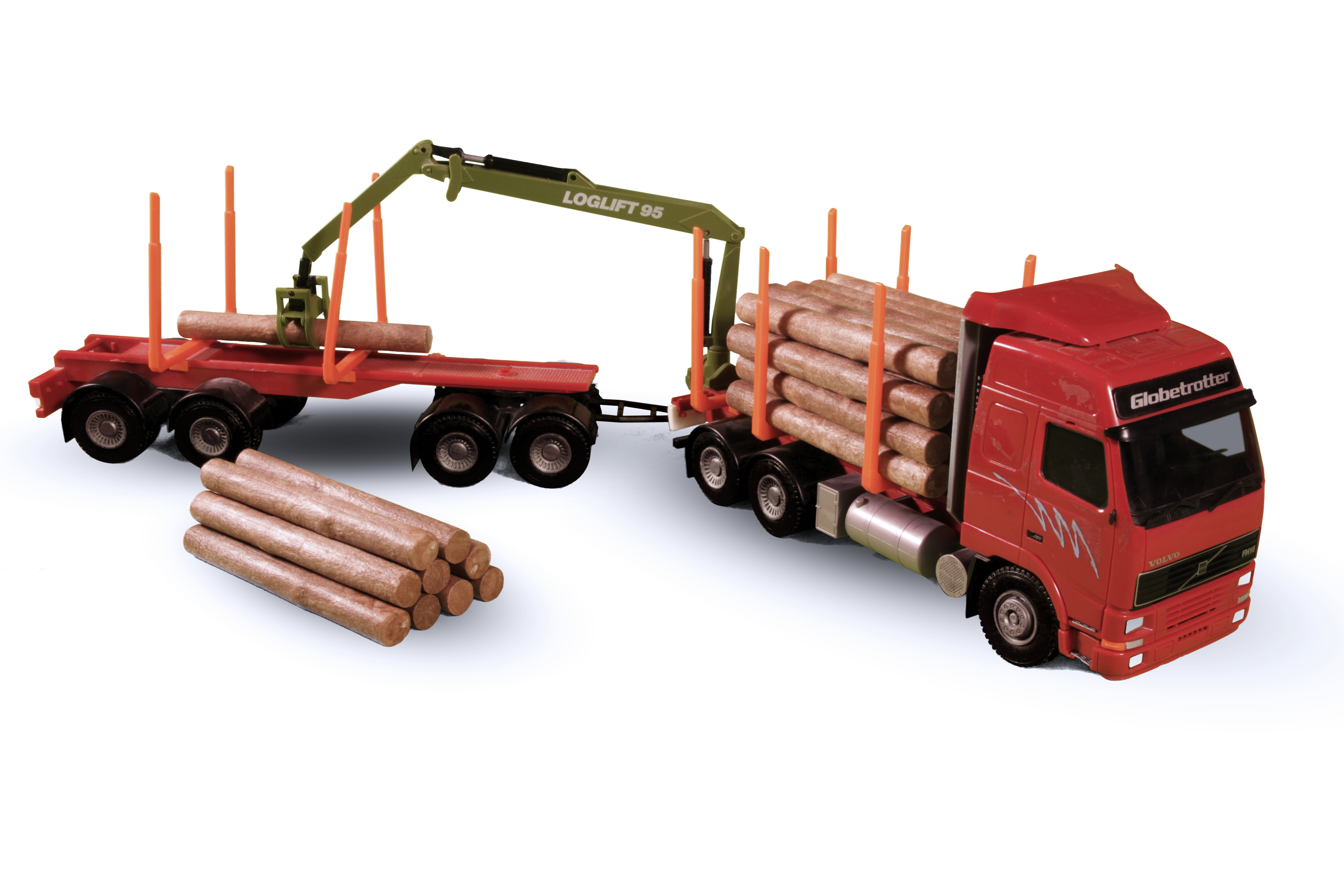
Volvo FH16 Globetrotter Timber Truck by Emek-Muovi.

Around this time Stahlberg was apparently taken over by Emek Muovi, another Finnish plastic model maker, known for its trucks in 1:20 scale. Emek had either previously also made Volvo models similar to Stahlberg or, more likely, took over Stahlberg's dies and continued production. Post 1990, however, Emek was more known for its plastic trucks in 1:25 scale.

Some Stahlbergs, like the Mercedes W123 wagon and Saab-Lancia 600, were produced in the 1990s in Estonia by Norma, either by company contract or from original dies used by a separate company. These models were made of the similar soft plastic, and had similar undetailed chassis simply molded "Made in Estonia".
