= Hubley Manufacturing Company =

American toy company

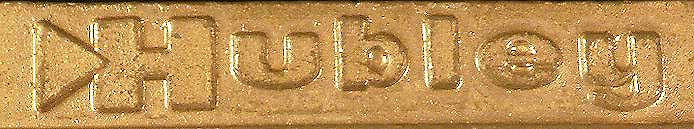
From the base of a Hubley Real Toys 1958 Ford Fairlane.

The Hubley Manufacturing Company was an American producer of a wide range of cast-iron toys, doorstops, and bookends. Toys, particularly motor vehicles and cap guns, were also produced in zinc alloy and plastic. The company is probably most well known for its detailed scale metal kits of Classic cars in about 1:20 scale. Starting in 1960, Hubley participated for a couple of years with Detroit automakers as a plastic promotional model maker. Many Hubley toys are now sought-after collectibles.

== History ==
The Hubley Manufacturing Company was first incorporated in 1894 in Lancaster, Pennsylvania by John Hubley. The first Hubley toys appeared in 1909 and were made of cast-iron, with themes that ranged from horse-drawn vehicles and different breeds of dogs, to tractors, steam shovels and guns. Hubley's main competition in the early years was Arcade. Early toys were known for their complexity; a delicate 11 inch long Packard Straight 8, a five-ton truck that came complete with tools, a road roller that came in five different sizes, a steam shovel with working arms and shovel, and Chrysler Airflows with take-apart bodies. Hubley's was especially known for its many motorcycles, which were creative and often included sidecars or hooked to delivery vans that said, for example, "Say it with flowers" on the sides.

In the late 1930s, the company began shifting to diecast zinc alloy (mazac) molding similar to Tootsietoy which had been doing toys in diecast since 1933. Foreshadowing the post-war diecast boom, and perhaps in an attempt to steal some of Tootsietoys' thunder, new mazac and plastic Hubley toys were now called Kiddietoys – a name which was used at least until the mid-1950s. Household objects such as doorstops and bookends were also produced, but automobiles, trucks and airplanes gradually became Hubley's mainstay.

Hubley's casting process involved several steps. For a particular toy, bookend, or doorstop, metalworkers would first carve a wood form, or hammer out the basic design in metal. Pressing this form into finely compacted sand created an impression for molding. Cast iron heated to 3000 degrees was poured into the sand mold and, when cooled, the form would pop out. Rough edges would be filed away and the mold ready for mass production casting. Painters applied a base coat (usually white or cream but sometimes black) to cast figures whether toys or doorstops. Then, colorists used a variety of hues highlighting important details.

By about 1960, different lines were introduced to distinguish toys for younger folk from products for older hobbyists. In fact, the company suddenly tried to compete with a variety of market segments all at the same time, pitting itself against other metal kid's toy maker, kit manufacturers, and British diecast producers. One such toy was their Tic-Toy clock with visible interior gears. In 1965 was acquired by the Lido Toy Company.

The company also dabbled in plastic promotional models. Hubley offerings may have represented too broad of a competitive brushstroke, however, as the company was pretty much out of business by the mid-1970s.

== Cars, trucks and other vehicles ==
The Hubley Manufacturing Company made accurate metal replicas of many popular American cars and trucks, with some foreign models also represented. Construction, farm, and fire vehicles were commonly produced, as well as motorcycles. A couple of earlier examples were a detailed 1934 Chrysler Airflow, a 1934 Ford coupe, and a 1930s Studebaker. In good condition, Hubley's 1937 Lincoln-Zephyr pulling a trailer can bring in several hundred dollars. Up through the 1950s, the emphasis was on children's toys, though some of these so-called toys could be fairly sophisticated, like the eleven and a half inch long Indian 'crash car' cast iron motorcycle complete with parts and accessories, or a fairly complex tow truck.

Hubley made simple diecast metal toys all the way through the 1970s. One popular toy was a (nominally) 1941 Cadillac sedan that sometimes came decorated as a taxi. Another common vehicle up through the 1970s was a realistically detailed 1934 Ford coupe.

=== Classic metal kits ===
About 1960, however, a change occurred as Hubley became known for its detailed metal car kits, which were unique in a market of dominantly plastic offerings. Hubley even set up its Scale Model Division for these products. These metal kits, issued in various scales, were more expensive than plastic models, and, when finished, were naturally quite heavy. Complexity in detail was often seen – with opening hoods, doors, moving phaeton panels, and detailed engines and chassis.

Perhaps because of the complexity of casting a metal model, Hubley's range of marques for the kits was not that wide – basically a 1:20 scale range of Ford Model As and 1932 Chevrolets, a 1:22 scale range of Packards, and two 1:18 scale Duesenbergs. The small range was made up for, though, in the number of variations for each car model. For example, there were 7 Ford Model A body styles alone, including a Sedan, Station Wagon, Coupe, Roadster, Roadster Pickup, Victoria, and Phaeton. The 1932 Chevrolet kits were made in phaeton, roadster, and coupe versions. Another venerable model was the 1930 Packard, offered in Sport Phaeton, Dietrich, Roadster, Victoria, and Boat-tail variations, while the Duesenberg SJ was available as a Speedline Phaeton and a Town Car. Completing a Hubley model required a bit more dedication from the modeler as metal parts sometimes had to be filed and sanded in preparation for painting, and it was recommended screw holes all be pre-tapped. In the later 1960s, Hubley kits were sold under the Gabriel brand name.

=== Real Toys ===
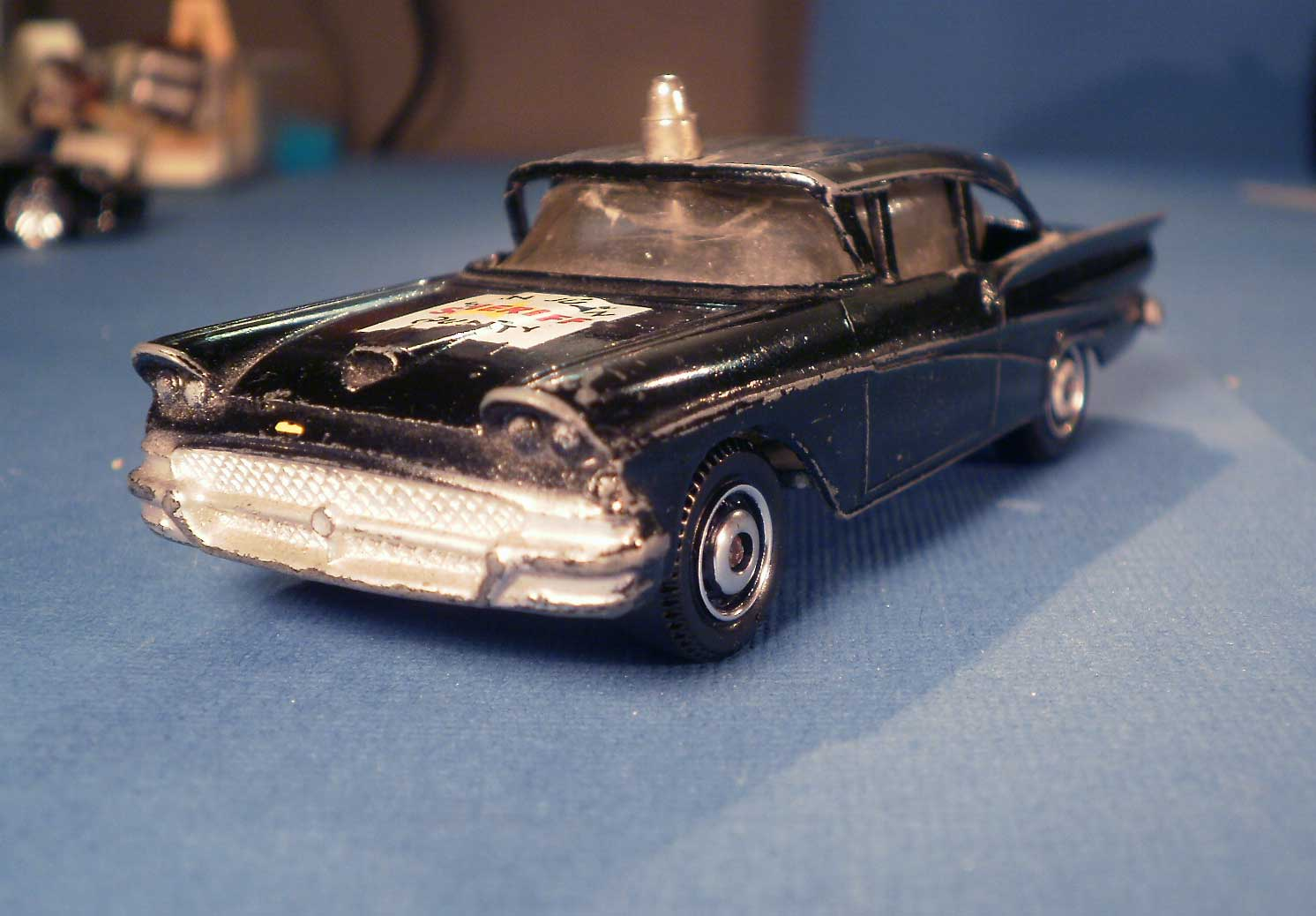
Hubley Real Toys 1958 Ford Sheriff's Car in about 1:50 scale. Toy is from about 1960. Wheels are from a later Matchbox.

Another direction around 1960, was Hubley's pre-assembled Real Toys line (called Real Types in Canada). These cars were about 1:50 scale and measured approximately 3 1/4 inches long. Real Toys generally had no interiors, but detail and body proportions were spot-on. Though these were a bit smaller, the competition seemed to be British Corgi and Dinky Toys. Wheels were simple metal discs with axle hubs sticking through. Tires were rubber.

One model was a stately 1958 Chrysler Imperial, usually painted dark green. A more practical offering was the 1960 Chevrolet Corvair. Another, the 1958 Ford Fairlane sedan sheriff's car (decorated as from "San Juan County"), had accurate front grille and side detail, The round police light was a diecast metal piece attached to the roof as opposed to red plastic pieces protruding through holes in roofs on other toy brands. A Chevrolet soft drinks truck advertised "Sam's Soft Drinks" and a metro delivery van was also available in different liveries.

=== Kits and promotionals ===
From about 1959 to about 1962, Hubley got into making plastic models in about 1:24 scale, just a tad larger than the standard 1:25. Some of these were more toy-like and made assembled for the retail market, for example a Rolls-Royce Silver Cloud, a Mercedes-Benz 180 roadster, a Triumph TR3, and a Renault Dauphine. The Renault featured a realistic sliding 'moon roof'. "3 in 1" and "4 in 1" plastic kits were also offered for most of these. Whether the built models were actually used by the foreign companies as 'promos' is uncertain, but it would have been a different angle for an American company as none of the other American plastic model makers made promotionals for anything but domestic automakers.

Also in plastic, Hubley did make contracted promotional models, cars very similar to those made by AMT, Jo-Han, or PMC. Hubley's angle was unique in contracting particular models that other promo manufacturers did not, or could not, get contracts for. While AMT or Jo-Han focused on sportier two-doors and convertibles, Hubley promotionals were a bit different, featuring station wagon and four-door configurations, or independent manufacturers not represented by the other model makers. For example, one of the cuter promos ever done – by any company – was the Austin powered 1960 American Motors Nash Metropolitan. The Metropolitan was made in a couple of two-tone color schemes – similar to the real car. A polybagged and simpler version of the Metropolitan was also made for the retail toy market.

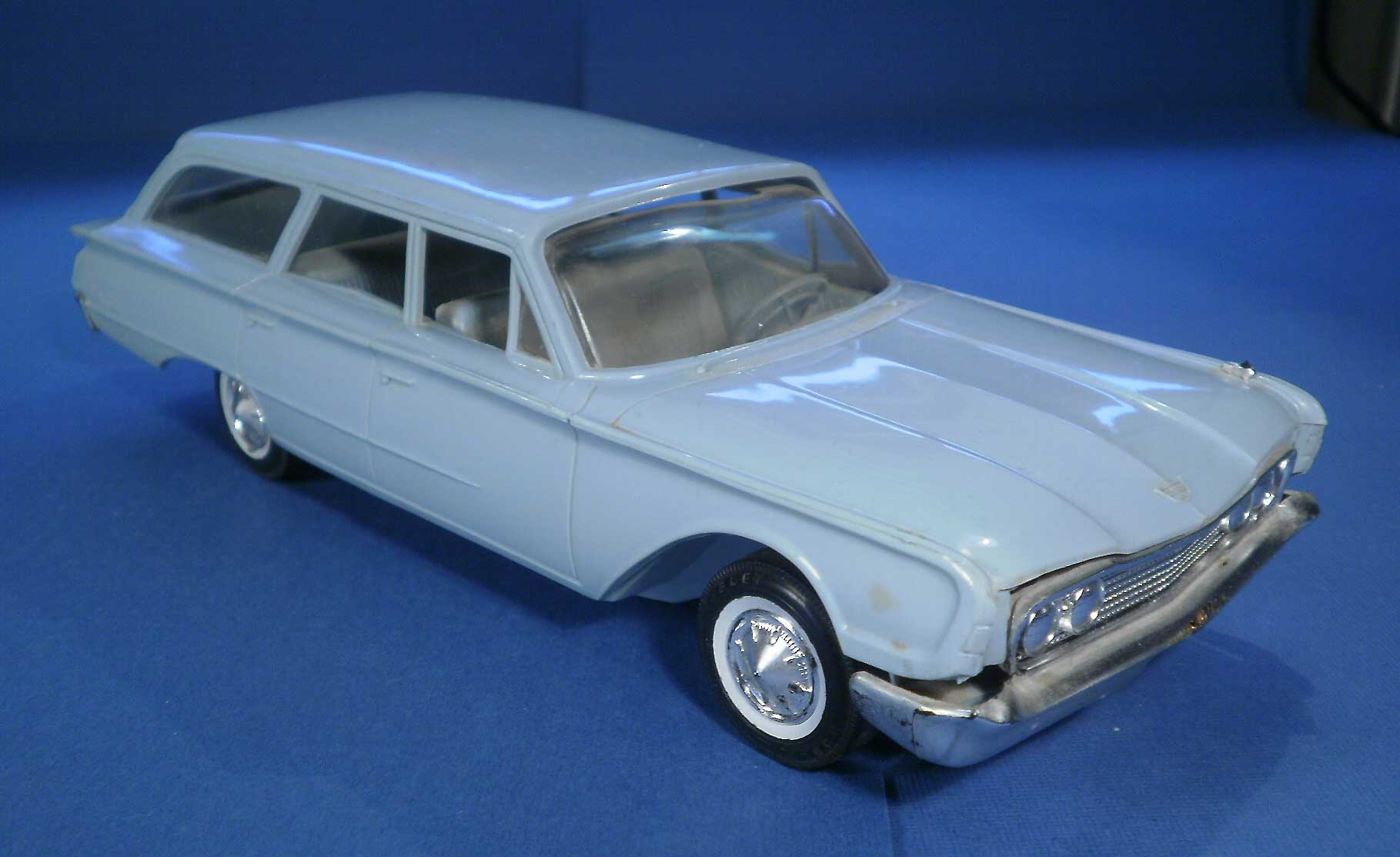
A 1:25 scale 1960 Ford wagon. Made out of acetate, early Hubley promotional models were prone to warping.

A more conventional promo line by Hubley were the full-size Ford wagon and sedan series starting in 1960, a niche not covered by AMT. The 1960 Ford wagon, molded in powder blue, was apparently a contract wrestled away from PMC which had the Country Wagon and Ranchero contract for 1959. Hubley continued offering a full-size Ford wagon and sedan for the 1961 model year, but apparently only made a wagon for 1962. Hubley's promotional offerings could have been the arrow that killed PMC as a promotional producer, since PMC's 1959 models were its last.

The 1960 Ford was made of cellulose acetate which tended to warp – but the 1961 and 1962 models were made of styrene, so body shapes were better preserved. Body details were just as good as AMT or Jo-Han. Hubley promo chassis detail was not quite as elaborate as AMT or MPC for the 1960 model, but it was better than Jo-Han's 'smooth slab' chassis which had no detail at all. For the 1961 and 1962 versions, more chassis detail was added as well as many specifications and ad slogans, similar to AMT models.

All the Ford wagon years were available either in solid-color, two-tone paint with the roof painted a different color than the body, or with "wood panel" vinyl siding popular on many period upscale wagons. For example the 1960 Ford Country wagon was available normally in a solid powder blue, a powder blue with wood siding, or a medium green with a brownish gold roof.

One box style for the 1961 wagon was a cardboard with the Ford 'shield'. This box was used in promotions where models were sometimes mailed to prospective customers. The Ford address label stuck on many of the boxes amusingly said, "Ford Motor Company: Model Car Fulfillment Dept."

== Aircraft ==
Hubley produced a wide range of airplanes, often reproducing actual military aircraft with good detail. Like the automobiles, Hubley aircraft were manufactured from multiple pieces which were usually put together with Solid Rivets. They had moving wheels and guns, and sometimes retractable landing gear. The wheels were often manufactured of rubber.

A Hubley plane from the 1930s was the Charles Lindberg-style Ford Tri-Motor with pontoons. A double rotor Piasecki Helicopter was also made. Post World War II, nice replicas of the Curtis P-40 Warhawk and the Lockheed P-38 Lightning fighters were made, which averaged eight-to-nine inches long. A Hubley toy line during the 1960s was "Kiddie Toys". One of the more popular of these looked like a P-47 Republic Thunderbolt, but with upward folding wings like an F4U Corsair. This plane came in a variety of bright colors, and had spring-loaded retractable landing gear with thick rubber wheels. The landing gear body covers were unpainted metal and not fuselage or wing color. Often planes and cars were available in gift sets.

== Overdiversification ==
Perhaps Hubley's diversification in the 1960s overtaxed its profits, weakening it financially by the 1970s. Hubley was purchased by toy maker Gabriel about 1969 who continued to make its regular kits and diecast kids toys through the 1970s. A series of colorful but rather unexciting generic make diecast toy trucks were available in a variety of forms (dump truck, tow truck, etc.) up until about 1980. Gradually, the Hubley name was downplayed in favor of Gabriel.

Around 1980, Hubley was acquired by CBS Toys which later sold many dies to Ertl and Scale Models, both of Dyersville, Iowa. For example, the Hubley Ford 4000 tractor was reproduced by Scale Models, up through the 1990s and perhaps later. In the 1990s, some Hubley vehicles like the school bus, were also reissued with minor variations from the original casting.

Ertl has now stopped production of all of the original toy dies and molds purchased from Hubley. As a result, all remaining Hubley/Ertl metal kits are fairly rare. They can be purchased from auction web sites as well as from collectors and older hobby stores.
