= Product Miniature Company =

American toy company

Product Miniature Company, or known by the acronym PMC, was a company that manufactured pre-assembled plastic promotional models cars, banks and toys in Milwaukee, Wisconsin. It was started by brothers William Edward "Ed" and Paul Ford in 1946. Car model production, the company mainstay, ended about 1965. In 1958 or 1959 the company moved to Pewaukee, west of Milwaukee, and remains there to this day, now producing other plastic promotional products, but not vehicles. Sigmunt "Zigmund" Alexander Suchorski worked as a molding machine operator for Product Miniature in Milwaukee

== A first in plastic ==
In the late 1940s and early 1950s, PMCs main rivals in promotional vehicle models were Banthrico, National Products, AMT, SMP, and Jo-Han. PMC's vehicle products were called "Tru Miniatures".

PMC introduced its first models about 1947, around the same time as Ideal Models, which later changed its name to Jo-Han. Though Banthrico and the similar National Products models were metal, PMC, along with Jo-Han, were the first promotional companies to introduce plastic models to dealerships, both beating AMT by a year or so. Models were first molded in cellulose acetate, which tended to warp over time. Among automotive promotional model makers, PMC and SMP were the only promotional companies that produced nearly all of their products through the lives of their companies (the 1950s) in warping plastic, as they were largely defunct by the time non-warping styrene was introduced. In the early 1960s, PMC did produce some commercial toys in styrene.

PMC's Chevrolet products, like Banthrico, were in the form of banks. Many bank models had the inscription on the bottom "To help save for a rainy day, or to buy a new Chevrolet. Banthrico and PMC set the stage for future manufacturers like AMT and Jo-Han, producing almost exclusively in 1:25 scale, though a few Chevrolets and Plymouths, like the 1953 Chevrolet Handyman and the early Plymouth Suburban, were produced in a larger 1:20th scale.

== Main clients ==
International Harvester was a regular client throughout PMC's existence with trucks models produced as late as 1957. PMC regularly worked with GM, specifically Chevrolet, while AMT cornered most Ford products, and Jo-Han most Chrysler products. Still, PMC did make 1955–1959 Ford Country Station wagons (and the 1959 Ranchero). The 1959 Fords were apparently PMC's last promotional offerings. Sigmunt "Zigmund" Alexander Suchorski's father Wladyslaw "Walter" Thomas Suchorski worked for International Harvester.

Apart from Big Three products, the company also made a few promotionals for independent companies, like the 1952–1953 bathtub Nash Ambassador. One interesting aspect of these Nashes was that the 'windows' were a molded part of the body and not clear – the windows came covered with a self-adhesive silver foil that didn't hold up well through time. PMC also made a couple of Trailways buses, including a GMC model 4102 or 4103 marketed by Ideal and issued in about 1952. It had an opening passenger door and changeable destination sign. Later, a larger Trailways Thru-Liner bus with opening side panels and removable luggage was also produced. In addition were Oscar Mayer Weinermobiles in 1954, 1992, and 1996 variations. The 1990s versions were far beyond the time that PMC usually made wheeled promotionals, and were the last vehicles PMC made.

GM offerings in the late 1950s spilled over to European Opel, when the Rekord was made for 1959 (and beyond in commercial styrene form). They even made a Volkswagen Beetle in the late 1950s and early 1960s, but it was unlikely the bug was actually a promotional for German VW.

=== International Harvester ===
PMC regularly offered International Harvester trucks, mainly pickups. A 1947 International pickup truck may have been the first PMC model offered, and one of the first plastic promotional models, period. It was made slightly larger than the normal 1:25 scale. Some reproductions of IH's brand of Farmall tractors were also offered as promotionals, some hauling a McCormick-Deering trailer. An International TD-24 bulldozer was made in a promo/toy version and also in remote control. Several Diamond-T semi tractor-trailer trucks (Diamond-T had been purchased by International) were also made, one in Mayflower livery.

PMC's early International models were usually molded in bright yellows, oranges, reds, and sky blues and were toy-like, but very attractive. Many of these were not promotional models, exactly, rather display models for the showroom. Some 1951 trucks can be found with a hole in the roof and chassis where a metal display post passed through the vehicle. Besides a pickup truck, the 1951 line featured a larger dumper/flatbed truck, a flatbed stake truck, and a moving truck. The 1955, 1956 and 1957 pickups show a decade long PMC relationship with IH. The 1955 International pickup was later offered by Canadian Kempro, of London, Ontario.

In the 1990s, the Slivka brothers, Tony and Bill, contacted the Ford brothers about machining for older model cars. They were able to purchase the 1956 International Triple Diamond pickup dies just before the company was going to scrap the casting equipment. Several of these were produced by the Slivkas as Triple Diamond Replicas out of Des Plaines, Illinois. These two-tone replicas carried IH logos on their doors and were very professional looking. Of course, they were now molded in non-warping plastic.

One of the more distinct International promotionals was the boxy Metro delivery van which International made from 1948 to about 1959. PMC's Metro appears to have been made in the later 1950s, and was one of the company's last promotional offerings. It had an opening rear door which slid outward from the rear of the van, revealing storage space inside. This model was offered in a common light yellow, a purple, and a less common lime green. The PMC offering was often packaged in a toy-like plastic bag stapled to a cardboard hanging card. One recent eBay offering of the Metro in original packaging was being sold for $200.00.

=== Plymouths in 1:20 scale ===
PMC offered Plymouth Cranbrook and Suburban models from 1950 through 1954. The 1950 and 1951 Cranbrooks were not offered with friction motors ("called coasters") while the Suburban wagon was. Most of these were done in a larger 1:20 scale of about 9 inches long. The Suburban came with some interesting details including an opening rear tailgate. The 1954 Suburban was offered in a red ambulance version with gold lettering on the sides, while the Cranbrook sedan also appeared in a yellow taxi variation.

The Plymouths were not as promotionally sophisticated at PMC's Chevys. Though the models were handsome, original manufacturers' paints were not applied, there were no interiors, and the molding and detail were not as precise. For, example, the car's bumpers were a part of the overall body molding. Perhaps the Plymouths represent a natural blend in product ideology between the more toy-like IH offerings and the serious promoting that was to come with Chevrolet.

=== Practical Chevrolets ===
In the early 1950s, Chevrolet became PMC's bread and butter client. At this time, PMC turned more serious in the promotional business, as Chevrolet demanded more precision in detail and application of actual company paints on its models – thus the toy-like colors and appearance of the International trucks was abandoned. PMC offered Chevrolet models from 1951 through 1958.

The first Chevys offered in 1951 were in regular sedan as well as 'fastback' Fleetline versions. Previous to this, National Products and Banthrico had offered Chevy models. The first Bel Airs were offered in 1953; a 4-door sedan and convertibles in several colors. A more basic smooth sided '53 Chevrolet 150 sedan was also offered. 1954 brought similar offerings. At least on Chevy, the '55 sedan was offered in remote control form.

The 150 sedan shows an interesting trend in promotional offerings when comparing the early 1950s with the early 1960s. The pre-performance, post-war era of practicality in the early 1950s gave emphasis to more economical sedans, so it is notable that early promotional model makers commonly molded vehicles in 4-door configurations even in the most basic models available. Four-door Bel Airs were offered by PMC all the way up to 1958, one available with police decor. It is interesting that PMC also did a 1958 Chevrolet in two-door style, reinforcing the trend that by about 1960 most promotional makers only modeled sportier and more powerful 2-door coupes and hardtops. However, a molded red four door did become a Fire Chief car. This was in line with the newer era of a stronger economy, more affluent clientele and the onset of the new baby-boomer driver's market.

America's first sports car, the 1954 Corvette, was made by PMC. It was produced with a removable hardtop. Later Corvettes, up through at least 1958, were also offered. The 1956 and 1957 Chevy smooth-sided Cameo pickup truck was another PMC model offered in both promotional and friction versions.

=== Ford heritage – PMC's last promos ===
Ford wagons were offered from 1955 through 1959. The '55 was offered as a 'Red Cross Ambulance'. Normally the promo versions were painted and had green tinted windows while retail versions lacked the paint and went windowless. PMC's last promotionals were 1959 Fords in a slightly larger scale about 1:20; the Ranchero and Country Sedan wagon (AMT had the two-door hardtops and convertibles). PMC's late 1950s Ford Motor Company offerings were not limited to the Ford brand – the company also produced the 1959 Mercury Park Lane convertible in promotional and retail form. Most of the PMC Ford models were done in two-tone red and white or green and white paint. Models had complete interiors. After 1959, PMC sold these models in a simplified retail form, without interiors and greatly simplified wheels. Some of the retail 1959 PMC Fords were made in 2-tone colors, but most were cast in a solid turquoise or red. The retail models are discussed more below.

In the early 1960s, the toy company Korris Kars offered a '59 Ranchero and Country wagon in a less detailed softer and more flexible polyurethane plastic. At first glance it appears to be a reworking of the PMC casting, but it is not. They were done in 1:25 scale, and did not have a metal chassis, rather one entire body casting to which axles were directly attached. As such, they had crude interiors, once again, as part of the whole body casting. The black plastic wheels had stick-on hubcaps.

Since PMC had only offered the 1959 Ford models in Ranchero and Country wagon versions, Promolite Resin Models produced a model of the 1959 Ford Custom 300 body to fit a chassis made by PMC.

== Product Details ==
Most years, PMC packaged its cars and trucks in fairly bright, colorful boxes – often with accurate illustrations of the vehicles adorning their sides. Often boxes would say "A Tru-Miniature" on the sides in large letters – possibly making some believe that was the name of the company. Most PMC models throughout the years did not have interiors, exceptions being convertibles like the 1953 Chevrolets, the Corvettes, and the 1959 Ford Ranchero and Country Sedan station wagon. Of course, early Chevy cars were banks, so a detailed interior was not offered. On the bank models, a coin trap was made in the chassis so money could be removed.

Chassis detail varied quite a bit in different models. Though more toy-like in execution, early International pickups had detailed plastic bases with engine, exhaust and suspension details clearly molded. Starting about 1954, though, most bases/chassis were made of metal, which apparently added structural strength for friction motors that started to be popular in many promotionals. For example, the 1955 Bel Air without friction motor had a chassis completely smooth and molded in plastic, while the 1954 Corvette, with "spin-torque motor" (as PMC called it), had a metal base. Though PMC offered no promotionals after 1960, other promotional model makers found the new and harder styrene plastic durable enough to support the motor. Also, plastic bases did not rust over time.

PMC Chevrolet models often came colored with actual GM colors. The name of the color would actually be stamped in white or black depending on the shade of the car (for example, "Woodland Green", "Sungold" or "Campus Cream"). The color would be printed on the center of the roof parallel with side windows. In the case of the 1953 Bel Air convertible, the name was found on the center of the trunk lid, printed parallel with the bumpers.

Tires were black rubber often with a whitewall. Early PMC wheels on IH trucks were attractive red plastic with a small metal hub. These also appeared on many Chevys. Some of the wheels were simple "moon" type style, while some of the International and Plymouth wheels were a less attractive simple white plastic hub which commonly yellowed and became brittle with time. Usually the wheels were generic and not rendered with accuracy to the real cars, but this was the 1950s. An exception appears to have been the 1959 Ford Ranchero which had realistic renderings of the car's actual hubcaps.

== Retail Toys ==
About 1959, PMC moved a few miles west of Milwaukee to Pewaukee. The 1959 Ford Ranchero and Country Sedan wagon and a 1959 Opel Rekord seem to have been the last promotionals offered by PMC. Since the Opel did not change much for 1960, it was carried over to the next year. By 1960, however, Hubley gained contracts for plastic promos of the Ford station wagon, which it carried over through 1962, apparently pushing PMC out of the promotional business.

After 1959, PMC's history gets fuzzy. PMC, or another caster using PMC's dies, later made simplified retail toy versions of earlier models up to as late as about 1965. Available at dime stores like G. C. Murphys, the Ranchero, Beetle, Opel, 1958 Chevrolet Cameo pickup, and probably others, were offered in a more simple style in non-warping styrene. They were simplified from the promo versions, with no interiors or windows and wheels were solid black styrene with or without whitewalls. The earlier of these retail versions of the Ranchero were still molded in two-tone colors, but later, solid colors were used (turquoise green or red were two choices). These were offered as either unassembled kits or assembled models, sometimes poly-bagged.

It appears 1959 was a pivotal year for promotional model makers, and PMC in particular. Perhaps some of the company's decline had to do with the expense of engineering the new non-warping styrene plastic mixed with the tooling required to make the increasingly popular kits that other manufacturers took up. PMC's kits were very simple and not as well known as those of AMT, SMP or Jo-Han. As a company, Jo-Han did well, but was always the lesser of the Big Three (being AMT, MPC and JoHan. SMP was absorbed by AMT, but PMC had already weakened by 1960 and gradually weakened through the decade.

Another blow to PMC's car production was Hubley's contract for 1960 through 1962 Ford wagons and hardtops, a niche that PMC had in 1959. Adding insult to injury, Ford dropped its full-size Ranchero model and neither did PMC get the contract for the new Falcon-based pickup. Perhaps the company's decision to exit production of promotional and car models was also due to a peripheral headquarters location in Milwaukee – away from close contact with Detroit's design offices.

PMC, after establishing some unique niches for itself with GM and IH over a decade, diminished into retail toy markets for a few years, and then abandoned most car model production. Today known as PM Plastics the company is still headquartered in Pewaukee, Wisconsin and makes plastic trays, containers, exercise steps, ramps, and other products (though a neat pontoon plane is shown on the company website). The company president is Bill Ford (son of founder Ed) and family member Gerald Ford is sales manager.
