= Aluminum Model Toys =

American scale model brand

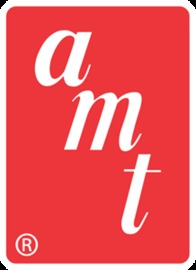
- Formerly: AMT-ERTL (1983–2007)
- Type: Private (1948–78); Subsidiary (1978–83)
- Industry: Entertainment
- Founded: 1948
- Founder: West Gallogly Sr.
- Defunct: 1983; 43 years ago
- Fate: Acquired by Lesney in 1978, later became a brand
- Headquarters: Troy, Michigan, United States
- Products: Pre-assembled plastic model cars, trucks, aircraft
- Owner: Round 2 (2012–)
- Parent: Lesney (1978–83); Ertl (1983–2007)
- Website: round2corp.com/amt

Aluminum Model Toys (AMT) is an American brand of scale model vehicles. The former manufacturing company was founded in Troy, Michigan, in 1948 by West Gallogly Sr. AMT became known for producing 1:25 scale plastic automobile dealer promotional model cars and friction motor models, and pioneered the annual 3-in-1 model kit buildable in stock, custom, or hot-rod versions. The company made a two-way deal in 1966 with Desilu Productions to produce a line of Star Trek models and to produce a 3/4 scale exterior and interior filming set of the Galileo shuttlecraft. It was also known for producing model trucks and movie and TV vehicles.

The AMT brand was bought in 1978 by the Lesney company of UK, then by competitor Ertl in 1983, then by the Round 2 company in 2012.

== History ==
=== Beginning ===
Because Gallogly had solid connections with Ford Motor Company, he was able to place his first models exclusively in Ford dealerships, starting a long promotional relationship. Gallogly's first model was a 1947–1948 Ford Fordor sedan made of cast aluminium and painted with official Ford paint. After issuing successful Ford sedan models, the company set up shop on Eight Mile Road outside Detroit.

By 1948, injection plastic molding was already being used by Product Miniature Corporation (PMC). After the first Ford aluminium promotional model was offered, aluminium was abandoned. Different colors of plastic could now be used, so the company name was quietly changed to AMT, which deemphasized the word "aluminum". For example, AMT's 1949 and 1950 Ford and Plymouth sedans were its first plastic models, along with the 1950 Studebaker coupe. These promos often had wind-up motors which could not be seen through the shiny silver-tinted windows. They had metal chassis and diecast metal chrome-plated bumpers, which were later replaced with chrome-plated plastic. Often, official factory paint colors were applied to the models. The company's first commercial products were pre-assembled plastic promotional models, which were only available through automobile dealerships.

In the early 1950s day-to-day operations of the company were turned over to George Toteff so that Gallogly could better attend to his law firm. Model design was kept in-house, but molding was outsourced. Continental Plastics in Fraser, Michigan, was one of the companies contracted to mold AMT's models.

=== Early competition ===
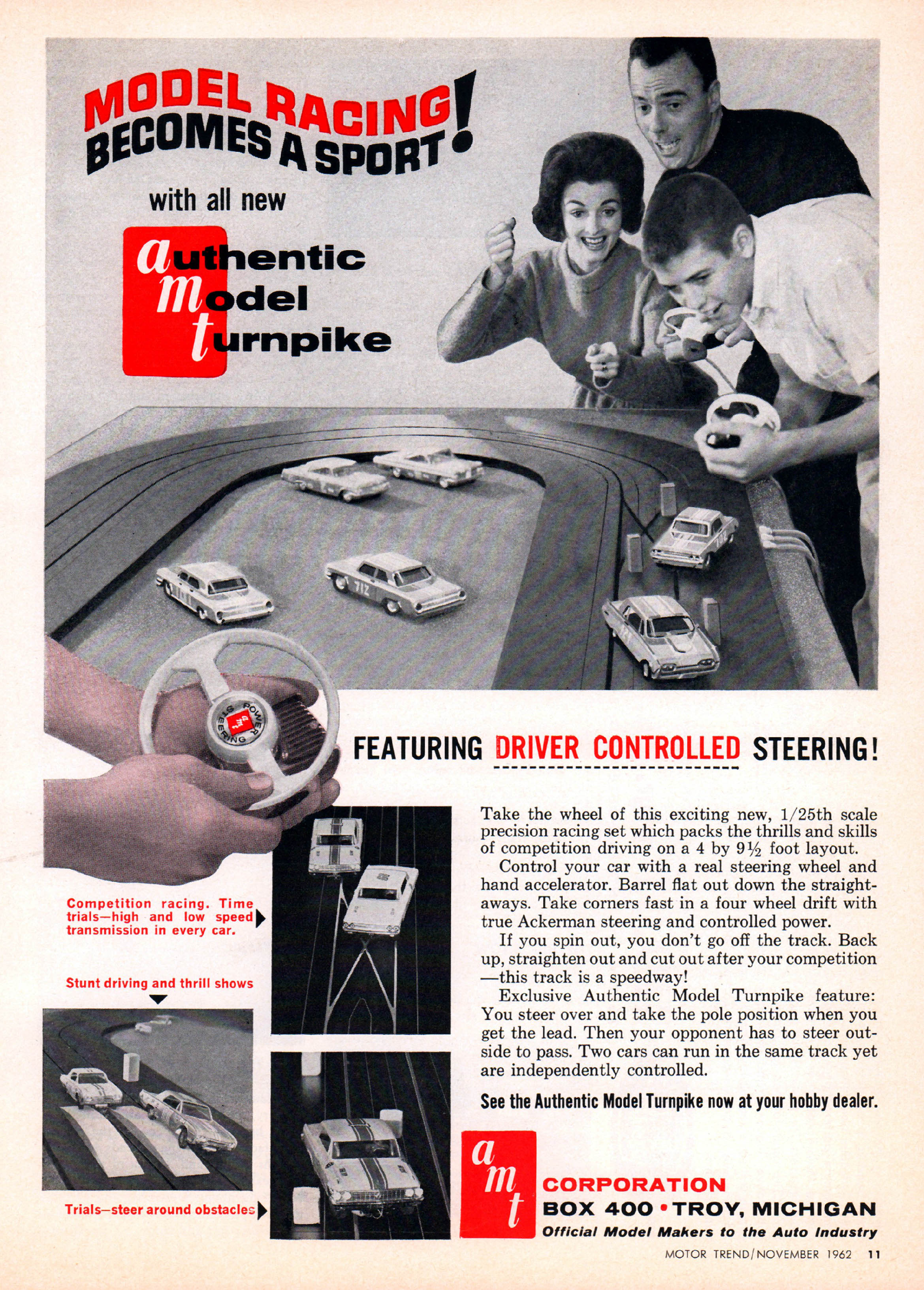
Advertisement of a AMT model racing track, 1962

AMT was the most successful company in the mid-1950s to mold accurate plastic models in 1:25 scale and sell them to auto manufacturer dealerships, but it was not the first promotional automobile model maker. National Products of Chicago, Illinois, started manufacturing pot metal promotional models in the 1930s. Among their earliest models were the 1934 Studebaker, Chrysler Airflow, Graham and Hupmobile four-door sedans and a variety of other cars and trucks. National Products was purchased by Banthrico in 1949. Banthrico started making promotional banks of animals and buildings in the 1930s. After World War II, Banthrico continued with a focus on precision metal replica banks of cars, accurately painted, and mostly in 1:25 scale. According to promo aficionado Clarence Young, these car models were used to display factory car colors to prospective buyers. Through 1956, Banthrico was the leader in metal promotional models.

Nevertheless, the use of plastic was on the rise and would become dominant once Banthrico quit manufacturing promos. These other companies were Scale Model Products (SMP), Product Miniature Company (PMC), and Ideal Models, which later became Jo-Han in 1955 because of the name conflict with the Ideal Toy Company. PMC may have been the first to actually produce a model in plastic, but Banthrico, PMC, and others faded while AMT and Jo-Han gained momentum on the promo scene.

Among these companies, SMP of Birmingham, Michigan, is the most significant to AMT. About 1958, SMP started what was to become the plastic modeling craze by introducing the “annual” kit, often with a 3-in-1 theme where the model could be built in stock, custom, or racing versions. Aluminum Model Toys bought SMP in 1961, adopting SMP's 3-in-1 kit idea and the SMP logo, which at the time was a diamond shape. AMT also adopted some of the SMP kit features when making promotional models. For example, the 1959 Imperial came with a detailed chassis and glued-in axle mounts. Also, the universally recognizable red rectangle with rounded corners shifted from SMP to AMT with a simple change of the diagonally-formed white letters. Thus, SMP seems to have created the 3-in-1 annual kit and logo, not AMT. AMT then marketed both the SMP and AMT names simultaneously for a couple of years. On promo boxes, the diagonal SMP logo was copied by AMT but that style did not last.

=== Promotional models ===
AMT then, through the early 1960s, ruled supreme in the promotional (and kit) market, rivaled only by Jo-Han. It is important to compare AMT marketing with that of other plastic model makers. Newcomer MPC (Model Products Corporation) entered the arena in 1964 with their Chevrolet Corvette kit, followed by 1965 promos of the Dodge car line. Plastic model makers like Pyro Plastics Corporation and Premier Products came and went, while other kit makers focused on different vehicles. Lindberg rarely touched the promo market. Monogram focused on custom, hot rod, TV, movie, racing cars, aircraft, and ships. Revell did U.S. vehicles, but focused on European sports and racing cars. Aurora Plastics Corporation diversified, specializing in aircraft, TV, classic Universal Monsters, and figure kits. Aurora also made a large range of 1:32 scale and several 1:25 scale car kits. Palmer Plastics sold a number of American 1:32 scale car models for 98 cents each throughout the 1960s, but these models were poorly detailed and lacked basic features such as clear windows and correct wheel covers.

Importantly, through the 1950s post World War II, plastic gradually became the primary material for the modeling and collecting hobby in the United States. The post-war labor and business environment in the U.S. supported only the simpler casting of cheaper materials for toys, although they could be made with great detail. By contrast the common trend in Europe was making more sophisticated diecast metal zamak toys in smaller sizes with many working features. These were more complex products for a labor structure driven by a densely populated European craft guild environment. Such characteristics were not as prevalent in the United States.

==== Development ====
Promotional makers like AMT worked very closely with styling departments of American automobile manufacturers. An article appearing in Ford Times chronicled the manufacturing process of AMT models. Intricate drawings and styling models, just like with the real thing, were first constructed. Larger 1:10 or 1:12 scale clay models would be crafted to perfect details. Accurate dies in 1:25 scale, which was the most common, would be made from these for plastic injection. Bumpers and hood ornaments were chrome-plated and bodies were painted, often in factory colors. Painted bodies were baked in ovens, then the models were assembled and packaged.

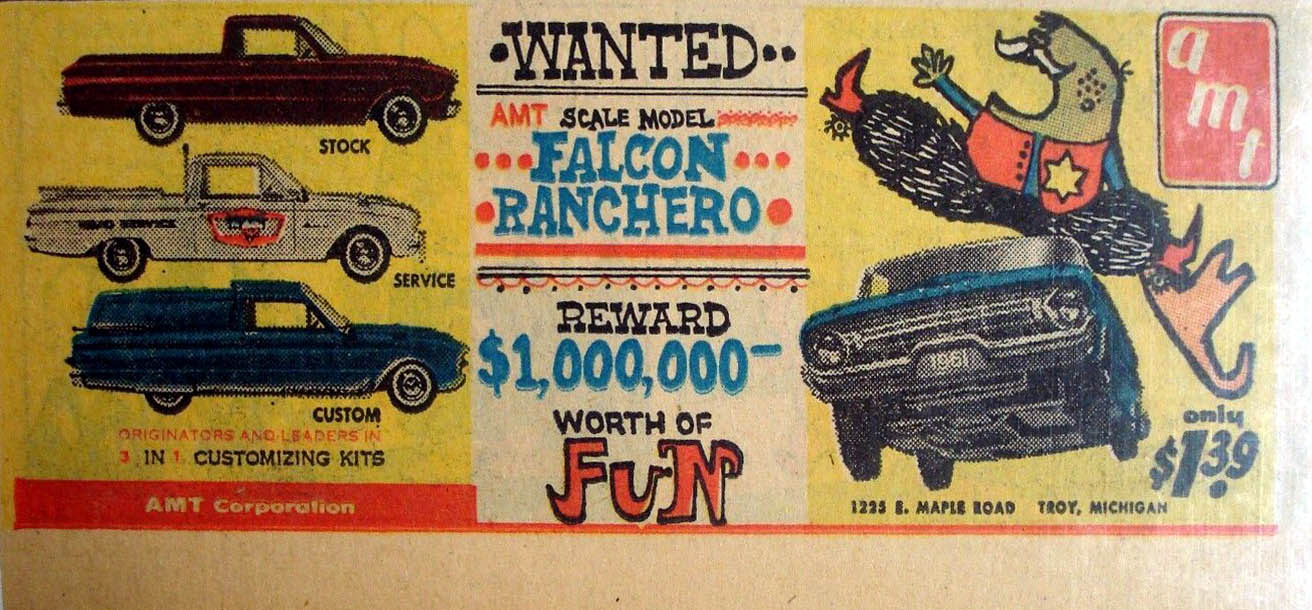
Ford Falcon Ranchero models on a 1961 ad

The auto manufacturers would often pay the cost of model tooling. Such costs could range anywhere from $20,000 to $250,000. The model companies were often pressed to get sales, display, paint and promotional details correct in order to offer the models to the “Big Three” before the real vehicles hit the market. Detroit's annual model changes required last minute alterations in model details and showroom displays had to be finished in advance of the actual cars reaching the dealerships. One example was AMT's 1968 Chevy hardtop kit. AMT did not have access to GM's 1968 details, so the resulting model was not correct. (MPC was able to get the '68 details and produced accurate models of the Impala SS 427 in both Sport Coupe and convertible styles). Another example was the 1960 Ford Falcon promo that was offered in a hardtop, which was not available on the actual car. Limitations of models offered also sometimes had interesting results. The 1966 Mercury Comet promo came only in a hardtop and that year a convertible paced the Indianapolis 500, so the 500 promo came in any style desired as long as it was a hardtop.

Models were sometimes used in dealerships as display materials that were not generally sold. They were also used to promote sales to customers. Models would be used to show prospective customers what new models would look like. They could also be purchased at the parts counter for around one dollar. Commonly, especially in the 1950s, they were simply given away in the showroom after a test drive, usually to children. For example, a 1958 Edsel advertisement prompted "Road Check The Big One, Get A Little One Free".

=== Details ===
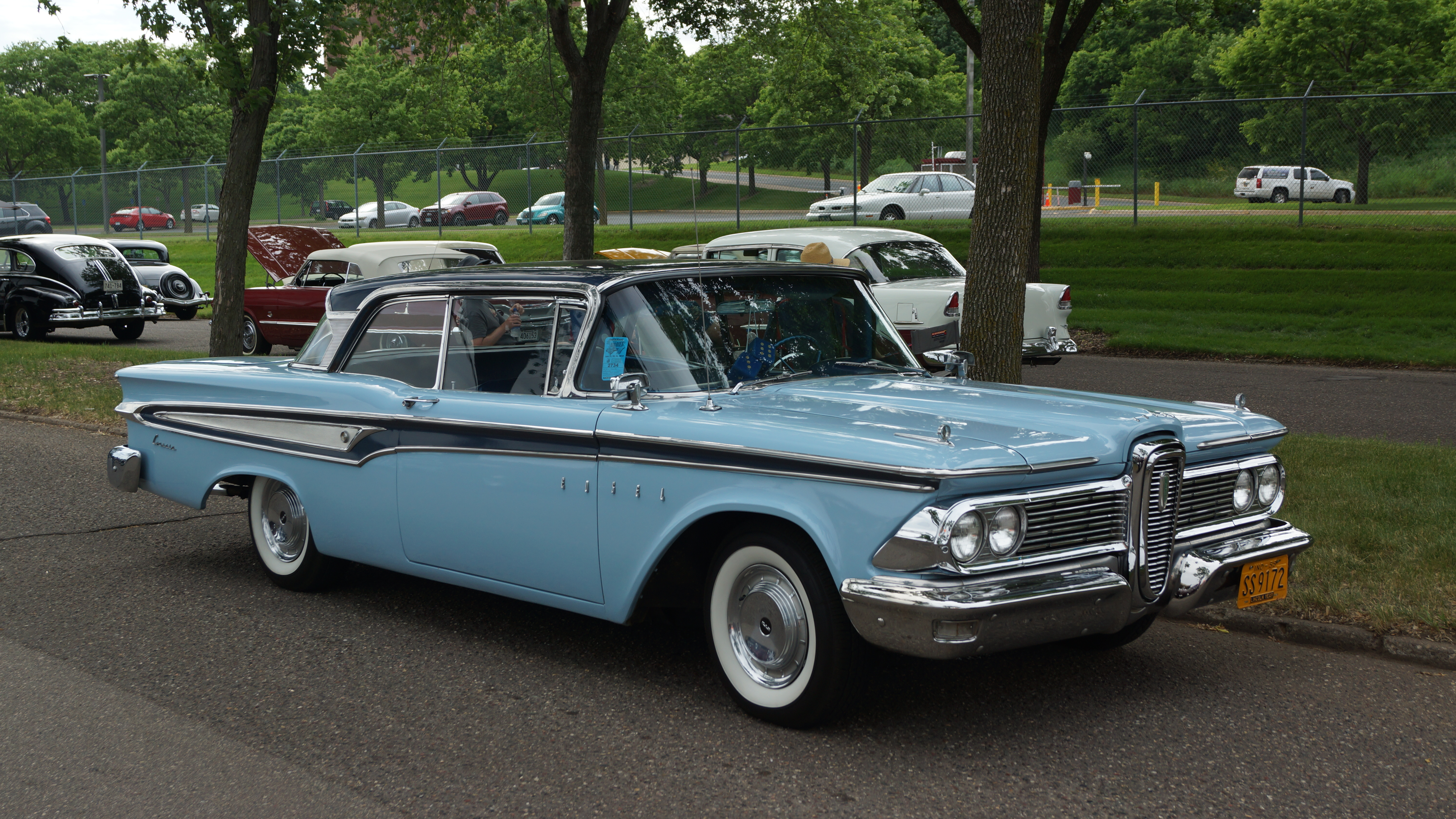
The 1959 Edsel Corsair (pictured) was produced with warped body panels which were made out of cellulose acetate. Styrene bumpers did not warp.

Though simply cast, promotional models were exquisitely detailed and proportioned, and by 1960, AMT became the main supplier of the pre-assembled model to American car companies. AMT worked most closely with Ford Motor Company and General Motors Corporation, but promo contracts among the model manufacturers seemed to alternate year to year. Shapes of the vehicles were near perfect, though in the 1950s, cellulose acetate, the plastic of choice, was prone to serious warping. In 1960, AMT and some other manufacturers switched to styrene (the brand name being Cycolac, which is actually ABS – or rubbery styrene, more flexible and less brittle) and by 1964, all of the major model car manufacturers had changed over to the new plastic. This solved the problem and styrene models 50 years later still maintain their form. 1961 was a key year for the switchover. For example, some early 1961 Mercury Monterey two door promos were done in acetate while most for that year were done in the new non-warping Cycolac.

Models were molded in different colors, but often painted with actual factory paints, a practice that went back to the 1930s. Also, as with the 1964 Pontiac Grand Prix, the roof was cast in "vinyl" black. Script and emblem details were intricately molded into plastic bodies, grilles and wheels. Hoods did not open, there was no engine detail and no interiors on most models in the 1950s. Thus promos without interior or engine detail were called “coaster models” as opposed to kits with more detail. With the development of kits, however, viewing the interior became practical and as important as exterior appearance. Speedometer numbers could be read on the instrument panels. Horn rings on the steering wheels were accurately depicted brand by brand.

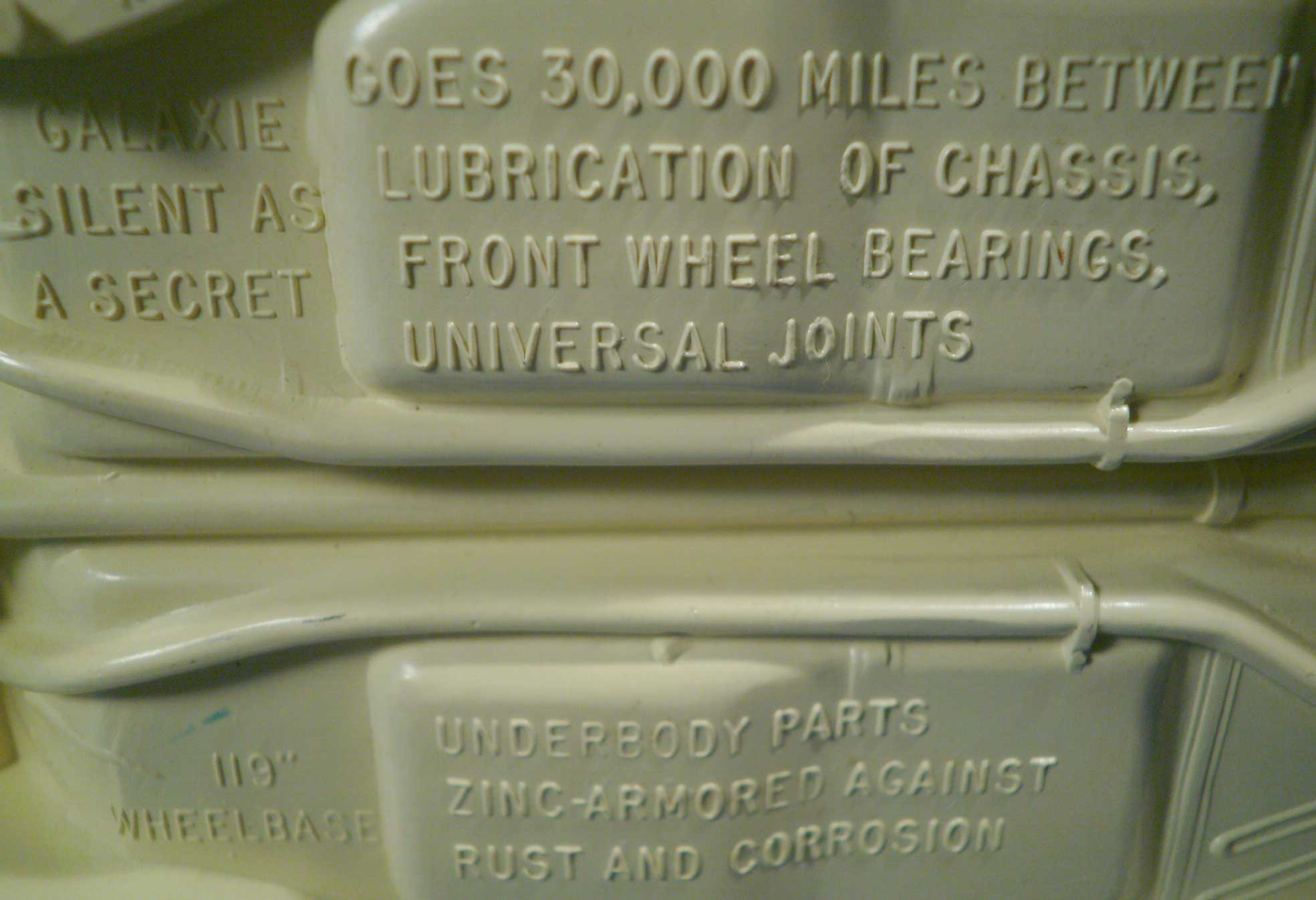
1962 Ford Galaxie chassis detail with promotional slogans and specifications

Early on, AMT chassis were often made of metal, but later, they were usually a single piece of plastic with lower engine, exhaust and suspension details molded in a single piece with metal axles fitted through holes in the sides of the plastic. Normally, on the chassis, there were no operating suspension parts. Wheels were one-piece plastic pressed onto the axles. With parts typically "melted" together, forming a permanent bond, promotional models were much more durable than their counterpart assembled kits. Of course, promotionals were simpler and had fewer parts than kits which were a later marketing ploy to enhance sales. Hoods did not normally open and suspension details were molded into the chassis. One exception to this was the 1962 Ford Fairlane and Chevy Impala promos, both of which had an opening hood and a detailed engine. Beyond this, extras were not often built in, but there were occasional surprises like the button on the 1959 "Wide Track" Pontiacs which pushed the wheels inward toward the body to simulate how wide the new cars were.

Seats were often, but not always, part of the single bucket of the interior whereas they were usually separate parts in kits. Many promotional models have survived intact for decades, whereas assembled kits tend to fall apart as the plastic cement deteriorates and small parts fall off, unless they were "solvent welded" with acetone or some other specific solvent for ABSW. AMT commonly molded sales specifications into the chassis, especially on Ford cars. The promo 1962 Ford Galaxie, for example, had thirteen different phrases molded on the chassis, from the very factual "Vacation Volume Trunk-28 Cubic Feet" to the more fanstastical "Galaxie, silent as a secret" or "Enduring elegance with the power to please”.

Beginning collectors may try to simply identify a year of a promo from its license plate, but not all promos followed this tradition. 1970 and 1971 Thunderbirds had no year-stamped license plates, so telling them apart can be difficult.

A few, in the mid-1950s, like the 1954 Buick Roadmaster, 1954 Ford Customline sedan or the 1955 Sunliner, were also offered in remote control versions.

==== Radios ====
Also, some models were made with built-in radios, like the 1964–1969 Ford Thunderbird, 1964, 1966 and 1967 Riviera, 1965 Grand Prix, Dynamic 88 and Wildcat, and 1965 and 1966 Impala SS. Others were the 1966 Continental sedan, 1966 and 1967 Mustang fastback, 1967 Ambassador, and Chrysler Turbine Car, but this is not a complete list. These generally do not hold as much value as promos or frictions.

=== Decline ===
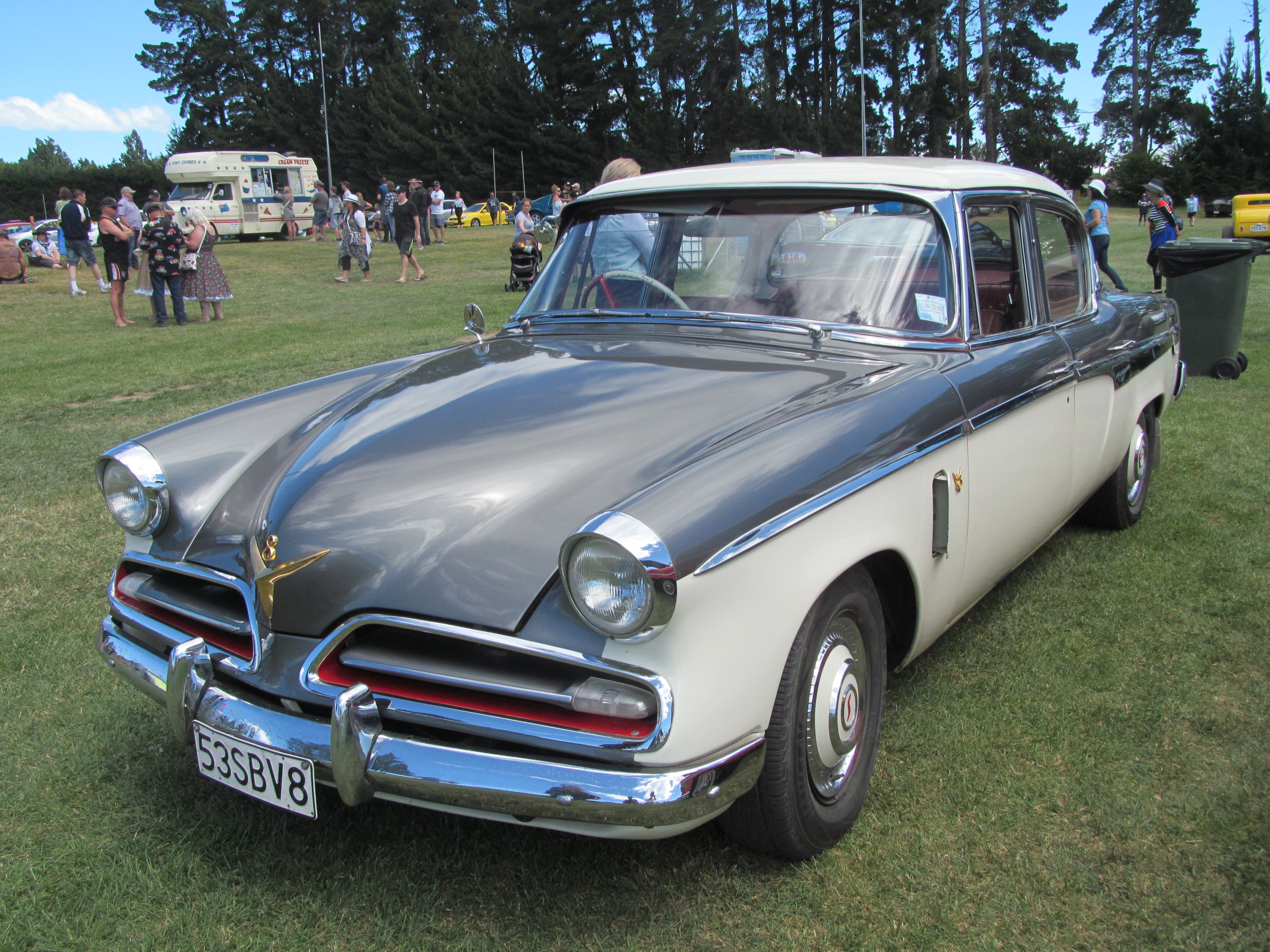
The Studebaker Commander was one of the cars modeled by AMT. The 3-in-1 kit was first issued about 1965 and has been reissued several times since.

Gradually, perhaps since the mid-1960s, the importance of promotionals began to dwindle. AMT produced their last dealer promos for the 1972 model year and by the late 1970s, plastic promos were mostly a thing of the past. AMT, along with MPC and Jo-Han, continued to produce promotionals until the 1980s, but it was not the enterprise it once was. Eventually models were offered only for the most sporty or prestigious cars and sold in dealerships for steep prices and not given away, so the term “promotional” hardly applied any longer. Also, the auto companies, which earlier had seen promotional models as easy and free advertising, began to charge fees to modeling companies in the late 1980s for the use of their names and designs. Thus smaller companies had a more difficult time affording manufacturing licensing.

Models began to appear in dealerships in metal by Ertl, Brookfield, and even Maisto, and in scales other than 1:25. Through the 1990s, AMT/Ertl continued some plastic promotionals in the traditional fashion, though metallic flake molded into the plastics was a new twist. These models were now made in China and were mainly Corvettes and Vipers. Plastic promotionals still exist, like the AMT/Ertl 2008 Dodge Challenger, but they cost at least $25.

== Friction powered models ==
In the 1960s, commercial versions of AMT promos were marketed in retail toy and dime stores like Zayre and Murphy, commonly for $1. Differences from the dealer promos were: the addition of a friction motor located on the front axle, noticeable by the studded white vinyl gear that protruded around the axle (and through the oil pan); and the lack of manufacturing paint schemes (they were simply molded in different colors). By contrast, the promo version often had a special lower engine plate that covered where the friction motor was placed on the commercial model. Early on, some cars, such as the 1953 Studebaker Commander promo, had the addition of acetate windows, while the friction powered model was windowless.

Slightly different were unassembled versions of the promo cars, like the AMT 1971 Ford Torino. These were typically simpler and easier to assemble than the full blown kits. In fact, before the 3-in-1 kits discussed below, promos were offered as kits without all the extra custom and hot rod parts. These were sometimes molded in color instead of the traditional white for the kits and easily assembled without glue.

Some cars were only manufactured as frictions or kits, but not promotional models. One example is the 1968 Ford XL Fastback, which was available only in bright yellow as a friction, or as an annual kit molded in the standard white color. However, the 1967 and 1969 XL were available as promos. Other cars were available as frictions and promos, but not kits. An example of this is the 1963 Ford Galaxie 500/XL "boxtop" square-roof hardtop. Some versions were only available in some forms as hardtops, others as convertibles.

AMT friction models competed with those also offered by Jo-Han at that time.

As collectibles today, friction powered models are worth somewhat less than official promos, but the quaintness of the frictions makes them equally appealing. Nevertheless, not all models offered as promotionals were also made as commercial frictions, like the 1964 Comet Caliente which came as a dealer promo only. Conversely, some dealer promotionals like the 1961 Falcons, did come with friction motors but were painted in dealer colors. Like promotionals, friction car models are extremely durable, using the same basic plastic components as the promos.

== Annual kits ==
...once companies realized that built up promos were already licensed, they could be reintroduced as assembly kits

— Jim Donnelly, Hemmings Classic Car

George Toteff, a senior manager at AMT came up with the 3-in-1 kit idea. It began when, as a young man struggling with marketing ideas at his new post at AMT, he made a pilgrimage to St Anne's in Canada and received a vision in a dream. The Trinity and three roses inspired him to create the 3-in-1 model car kit that propelled AMT to great success. Like most plastic model kits, AMT's parts were molded onto "trees" and could be separated easily for assembly. Kits of cars in stock form were soon augmented with parts to build custom and hot rod versions. Thus, the annual promotional model was also offered in kit form as an extra sales benefit. As mentioned above, this configuration was soon named the "3-in-1" kit where the modeler could build a car in stock, custom, or hot rod versions by selecting different parts included in the box. Some of AMT's first successful kits were of 1932 and other early Fords. These were reissued several times over the years.

Unlike promotional models which had sealed hoods, no engine detail, and basic suspension detail molded into the chassis, kits usually had opening hoods, full engine detail, complete interiors, and detailed multi-part suspensions. Earlier kits had less chassis detail and featured promo-like interiors, metal axles, whitewall tires and screws to attach the body to the chassis. Later kits often had more detail but metal parts such as axles, screws and hood clips were either deleted or made of plastic instead. Miniature whitewall tires, which were once a regular feature of kits, became outdated and modern blackwall tires took their place as they did on actual cars.

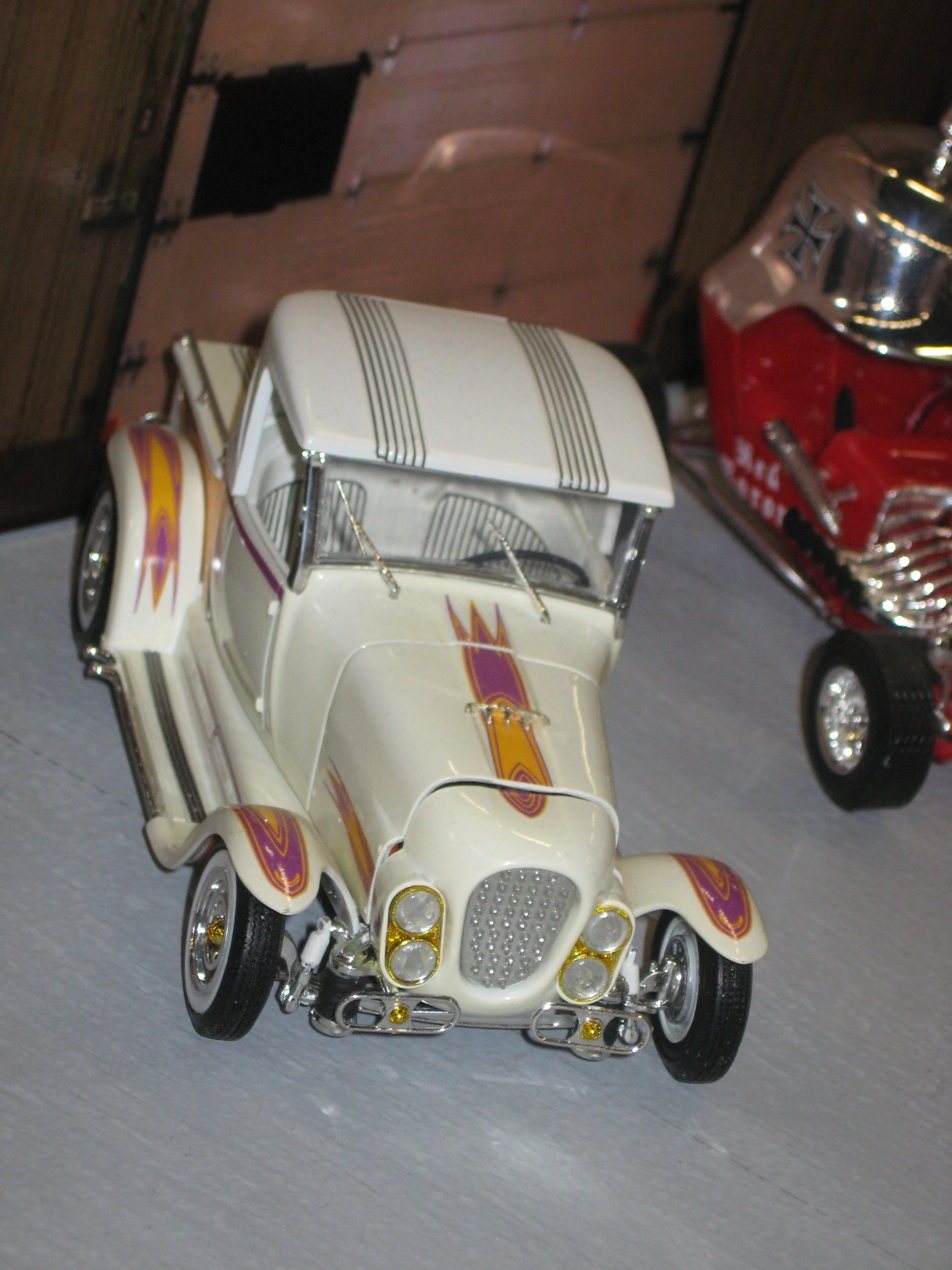
1:25 scale built kit version of George Barris' Ala Kart

Sometimes the same box design was used to package different kits. For example, the 1961 Pickup kit box illustrated both the Ford and the Chevy, but the kit inside the box was identified by a label affixed to the outside. In the early 1960s, AMT's 3-in-1 Trophy kit instructions usually came with short biographies of popular customizers of the day such as Bill Cushenbery, Dean Jeffries, Alex Kraus, Gene Winfield, Alexander Bros. from Detroit, and George Barris, most of whom were employed by AMT. Winfield even closed his California shop to work with AMT. Also, instruction sheets for some kits had a section with customizing hints by Barris exclusively. An extreme example was the 1957 Ford Thunderbird kit. The instructions included five pages devoted to "stylizing", a practice of adding parts by using body putty and sanding which went beyond ordinary customizing. Included in the kit were additional street rod, drag racing, and land speed racing styling ideas, all suggested by Barris.

By 1965 AMT and other kit manufacturers had made significant changes to their product lines. Although dealer-oriented promotionals were their lead business, by the mid-1960s most manufacturers developed a whole new market by tapping into customizing and customizers. These were often linked to TV and movie themes which now drove AMT and other model companies.

AMT offered some foreign car kits, but usually only if they were associated with U.S. car companies or a film favorite. An example was the 1971 Opel GT, a General Motors product made in Germany. Foreign car kits were left to other manufacturers such as Monogram or Revell. Custom TV and movie cars, often designed by Barris, like the ZZR (from the 1966 beach movie Out Of Sight) or the Monkeemobile, were also popular.

By the early to mid-1960s, modeling had exploded in popularity and kit sales easily overcame that of promotionals. Model Products Corporation, known as MPC, entered the promotional and kit scene in 1965 and by 1970 was just as popular as AMT. To fight back, AMT started offering kits for an even wider variety of machines and themes.

=== Trucks ===
In the 1960s, competition forced diversification and AMT added new product lines, specifically trucks. For example, its early Dirt Hauler kit was merely a generic tractor-trailer with dumping trailer. Then, in 1969, AMT released the California Hauler 359 kit. This new kit was a realistic model of a Peterbilt 359 tractor-trailer, the design having been copied from the manufacturer's specifications. It also had an authentic 8V71 Detroit Diesel engine under the hood. The kit lacked a sleeper cab, but there was a coupon that could be sent in along with ten cents to get it. The following year, the second version was issued with a sleeper cab. Due to the success of the California Hauler 359, AMT proceeded to issue more truck kits through the 1970s. Examples of offerings were the Chevrolet Titan/GMC Astro, Peterbilt 352, Kenworth W925, Autocar A64B and White Road Boss. Trailer kits to accompany these trucks, such as box, flatbeds, refrigerated and tankers were introduced. These kits tended to cost about $5.

When the TV series Movin' On debuted in 1974, AMT made new versions of many of their truck kits with new features such as CB radios, dragfoilers and sometimes new engines. For example, the Peterbilt 359 kit was given a Cummins NTC-350 diesel engine, a larger-windowed 1100 series cab (as opposed to the small-windowed Unilite cab) and a larger bumper in addition to the previously mentioned CB radio and dragfoiler.

When Ertl bought AMT in 1983 (forming "AMT-Ertl"), many of AMT's old truck kits were reissued, but completely new models were rare except for the Kenworth T600A (1991). In addition, some of Ertl's plastic model truck kits were reissued under the AMT-Ertl brand. Many of the old AMT truck kits can be found on auction sites like eBay, often commanding fairly high prices.

=== Star Trek and other science fiction ===
In July 1966 previews began to air for Star Trek, which were seen by executives at AMT. They sought a contract to produce model kits based on the starships and other props seen in the series. A contract was signed between AMT and Desilu on August 1, 1966, stipulating that kits based on the Enterprise could be made in exchange for AMT providing a 3/4 scale exterior of a Galileo shuttlecraft and an interior filming set. The prop measured 22 feet (6.7 m) long and 8 feet (2.4 m) tall, built by specialty car designer Gene Winfield working for AMT, from blueprints created by Thomas Kellogg.

Around 1966, AMT obtained the plastic model rights to Star Trek and developed a model kit of the Starship Enterprise, beginning a long association between AMT, science fiction and television. AMT's 1966 Enterprise model is one of the company's highest-selling kits. The original model of the Enterprise was equipped with battery-operated lights, but even after the lights were deleted, a number of features from the lighted model persisted in the kit, including a removable main deflector assembly which had covered the battery compartment and served as an on-off switch for the lighted model. There were also indentations in the saucer section where the light bulbs were to be placed. By the 1980s an ongoing series of tooling revisions were made to correct various inaccuracies, but these created a few new inaccuracies, such as a deflector dish that was too small and nacelle caps which were shaped incorrectly. There was also a kit of the Klingon D-7 Battlecruiser ship seen on the TV show. It too was lighted in its first couple of issues.

By the mid-1970s the Enterprise kit had been joined by a 1:12 scale figure of Spock defending himself against a three-headed reptile on an alien landscape, as well as models of a Romulan Bird of Prey ship, a Starfleet Shuttlecraft, the Enterprise Bridge, the K-7 Space Station from the episode “The Trouble With Tribbles”, and a three-piece Exploration Set consisting of approximately 3/4 scale, toylike models of a phaser, communicator and tricorder. Round 2 has reissued the Spock model, the Romulan Bird of Prey ship, the Enterprise, and the K-7 Space Station, all from the original AMT molds. The Klingon ship was reissued in 2011 and most of the other AMT Star Trek kits are scheduled to be reissued by Round2.

In 1968 AMT also produced a kit of a science fiction spaceship Leif Erickson designed by Matt Jeffries, the designer of the Enterprise and Klingon ships for Star Trek. This tooling was reused in the middle 1970s, albeit without several engine and ship parts as well as the original stand and the landing gear to the scout ship, to produce a glow-in-the-dark "UFO" kit. This UFO model was reissued in 2010 by Round 2 from the original molds, this time including the missing ship parts and the scout ship landing gear but still missing some engine parts on the main ship, as well as the original display stand. The Leif Erickson model was reissued in 2011.

AMT-Ertl has also reissued the former Model Products Corporation kits of various Star Wars spacecraft and has added several new designs based on the prequel trilogy.

=== Fire engines ===
In 1971 AMT issued models of at least three different pieces of American LaFrance fire-fighting apparatus, including a pumper, a rear-mount aerial ladder truck and a rear-mount articulating boom truck. The prototypes were selected to allow part sharing among the kits in order to minimize tooling costs. All three kits have been reissued by AMT-Ertl in recent years.

Surprisingly, given the company's penchant for licensing various television series, they did not offer models of any of the vehicles from the then-current Emergency TV series, such as the Crown Firecoach that was the first Engine 51, the Ward LaFrance P80 Ambassador that was the second Engine 51 or the Dodge rescue squad vehicle. Oddly, none of the decals supplied with the American LaFrance kits included markings for the Los Angeles County Fire Department that was also featured in the series. In addition, they also released a Chevrolet fire chief's car and a Chevrolet rescue van, the latter of which could be built in stock, custom, fire department or police department configurations.

== Buyouts ==
=== Lesney ===
In 1978, British company Lesney, makers of Matchbox diecast vehicles, bought AMT and moved the company to Baltimore, closing the Maple Road facility in Troy, Michigan (just outside Detroit). By this time, prices of plastics had increased and Detroit was squeezed by government regulations of safety, emissions and fuel economy. Detroit sponsored fewer and fewer promotionals so model companies depended more on kits but the model building hobby declined as well. Also, AMT had an incredible display of models and documentary history at its headquarters that was scattered at that time.

=== Ertl ===
In 1983 AMT was purchased by Ertl from Lesney and renamed "AMT-Ertl". The business then had a twenty-four year relationship until AMT was sold again in 2007. In the early 1990s AMT released brand new kits with new tooling for some of their old favorites, such as the 1955 Chevrolet Bel Air, 1966 Ford Fairlane GT, 1958 Edsel Pacer, 1960 Ford Starliner and 1957 Chrysler 300. These kits sold fairly well and can still be found on auction sites at reasonable prices. The details in these kits far exceeded any from the 1960s. In the late 1990s AMT did something new in releasing pre-assembled and painted versions of these kits. These assembled models were sold as the Masterpiece Series and were packaged in foam, similar to heavier diecast metal Franklin Mint or Danbury Mint models. Each had a Certificate of Authenticity enclosed. These models had finishes and featured whitewall tires along with very detailed and authentically painted engines, suspensions and interiors, although these seem to be oriented to the adult collector and not the possible customer. Selections included a 1957 Chrysler 300C, 1960 Ford Starliner, 1962 Chevrolet Impala SS convertible, 1962 Pontiac Catalina SD421, 1966 Buick Riviera and a few others. These ultra detailed models can still be had for less than $30.00 today on eBay. As assembled kits they were factory-glued together, but the glue used appears to be of high quality and when cared for properly they can be kept in good condition for years.

=== Round 2 ===
For a time, AMT kits were reissued by independent companies such as Stevens International and Model King, before AMT came solidly into the stable of Round 2 LLC of South Bend, Indiana in 2012. In an ironic turn that parallels other large companies, AMT now co-exists in the same organization alongside a revived MPC and Polar Lights. Ertl is still in the Round 2, LLC stable as Ertl Collectibles.

Today, Round 2 is making a determined effort to recreate some of the 1960s glory of the model car business. Reissued classics such as the 1962 Buick Electra 225 and the 1961 Ford Galaxie Skyline kits are now available with many of the original features including whitewall tires, metal axles, chassis screws, and molded-in suspension detail. Often the same exact artwork as when the kits originally appeared is reproduced for the new boxes. These reissues cost about $20.00, which is not unreasonable based on the value of the dollar today versus the early 1960s.

A few 1950s and 1960s models were reproduced and sold as promotionals featuring the sturdiness of the original 1960s promos in the late 1990s and early 2000s. These included the 1966 Ford Fairlane GT/A (based on the new tool), the 1964 Ford Galaxie 500/XL hardtop (based on the original tool) and the 1953 and 1954 Corvettes.

Today certain AMT kits and promotionals, especially models from the 1960s, command premium prices on the collector market. Typically, original muscle car promos such as Mustangs, Pontiac GTOs, Camaros and Chevelles command prices in the hundreds of dollars in mint, boxed original condition. Even full-size models of GM cars such as Chevrolet Impalas, Pontiac Bonnevilles and Grand Prixs also garner high prices. Such models, like the reissued kits, are easily obtainable through Internet auction sites such as eBay.

== Restoration aftermarket ==
As interest in vintage promotional, friction-powered, and annual kit cars in 1:25 scale increased, a market for reproduction parts developed. Replacement components are produced in resin and sold by specialized vendors. These parts are used by collectors and hobbyists to restore or repair older models. Available components include hood ornaments, wheels, tires, windshield frames, and other accessories. Some replacement parts are offered with chrome finishes, while others are supplied as unplanted resin and may require additional finishing by the purchaser.

In addition to parts, complete and partial resin kits in the original 1:25 scale are also available. These are typically reproductions of original promos and include many of the features of the original kit including whitewall tires, metal axles, and hoods molded into the body. The Modelhaus was a top-quality producer of scale resin kits, but they are no longer in business. Some resin makers offer partial kits which require additional parts (from kits currently produced). A good example of a partial reproduction kit in resin is the 1971 Dodge Demon. Although the original MPC Demon kit is worth hundreds of dollars, the SMH Resins Demon kit (around $50 retail) can be combined with AMT's current Plymouth Duster kit to finish. Some offerings are models that were never available when the kits were first issued. For example, Modelhaus offered a 1:25 scale resin model of the 1973 Chevrolet Caprice Estate Wagon, based on the original Caprice hardtop promo. These new issues originally sold at rather high prices, often $50 to $100 each, but because Modelhaus is now out of business, these sell for upwards of $300.
