= Model Products Corporation =

Defunct U.S. manufacturer of vehicle scale model kits

- Industry: Toy
- Founded: 1963
- Founder: George A. Toteff
- Defunct: 2011; 15 years ago
- Fate: Company defunct, remains as a brand
- Headquarters: Michigan, U.S.
- Products: Plastic scale model cars, aircraft
- Owner: Round 2 (2011–pres.)
- Parent: General Mills (1970–85); Ertl (1985–99); Round 2 (1999–2011)
- Website: round2corp/mpc

Model Products Corporation, usually known by its acronym, MPC, is an American brand and former manufacturing company of plastic scale model kits and pre-assembled promotional models of cars that were popular in the 1960s and 1970s. MPC's main competition was model kits made by AMT, Jo-Han, Revell, and Monogram.

Traditionally a Michigan company, since 2011 the "MPC" brand name has been part of Round 2 of South Bend, Indiana (which was also acquired by Japanese company Tomy for $ 640 million.

== History ==
=== Beginnings ===
MPC was established in 1963 by George A. Toteff Jr. (1925–2011) and Dick Branstner with facilities in Mount Clemens, Michigan. Toteff had been one of the original employees at AMT, eventually rising to vice president in the company. There, in 1958, he had developed the first “3-in-1” model car kits based on his innovative “side-slide” injection-molding technique, which allowed the tooling of one-piece model car bodies.

MPC produced its first promotional models in 1965; the first product to appear under its own logo was a highly detailed 1/25-scale 1964 Corvette Sting Ray coupe kit featuring working front suspension, and including extra speed and customizing parts. Their first 'promos' were a 1965 Dodge Coronet 500 in both convertible and two-door hardtop versions, a 1965 Dodge Monaco hardtop, and a 1965 Dodge Custom 880 convertible.

As with other companies before it, most notably AMT and Jo-Han, MPC developed many of its kits from pre-existing promo toolings. Toteff remained on good terms with his former colleagues at AMT, and many of the first MPC products were distributed in AMT packaging. For example, the 1967 MPC Plymouth Barracuda, originally made as a dealer promotional for Chrysler, was also marketed as a kit in an AMT box. Later, for 1968 and 1969 the newly designed second-iteration Barracuda reverted to an MPC box, with no apparent AMT connection.

Original model kits quickly followed, including the 1932–33 Chevy Roadster and Panel Truck, the first 'non-classic' subjects other than a Ford to be offered in 1/25-scale kit form.

=== Ownership of the MPC name ===
About 1970, General Mills bought MPC from Toteff, who stayed on as president. General Mills also had purchased Lionel and the MPC name and logo even appeared on early 1970s train sets next to the Lionel logo. After these two names was stated, "...of the fun group at General Mills". An example was the Silver Star train appearing about 1972, with "The Mighty Sound of Steam". In the late 1970s, General Mills created a separate identity for its toy and hobby arm, CPG Products Corporation. During this time, MPC kits were marketed as part of CPG's Fundimensions Division. General Mills's ownership lasted until 1985 when it sold off its hobby companies. General Mills then floated its remaining toy division as "Kenner Parker".

In 1985, MPC was purchased by The Ertl Company, which had also acquired AMT in 1981. Ertl, in turn, became part of RC2 Corporation in 1999, and was subsequently absorbed into TOMY International, Inc. From 2008, MPC products were re-issued under license from Japanese Tomy by Round 2 LLC, which ultimately acquired MPC's assets outright in 2011 (along with those of AMT and Ertl).

== Product lines ==
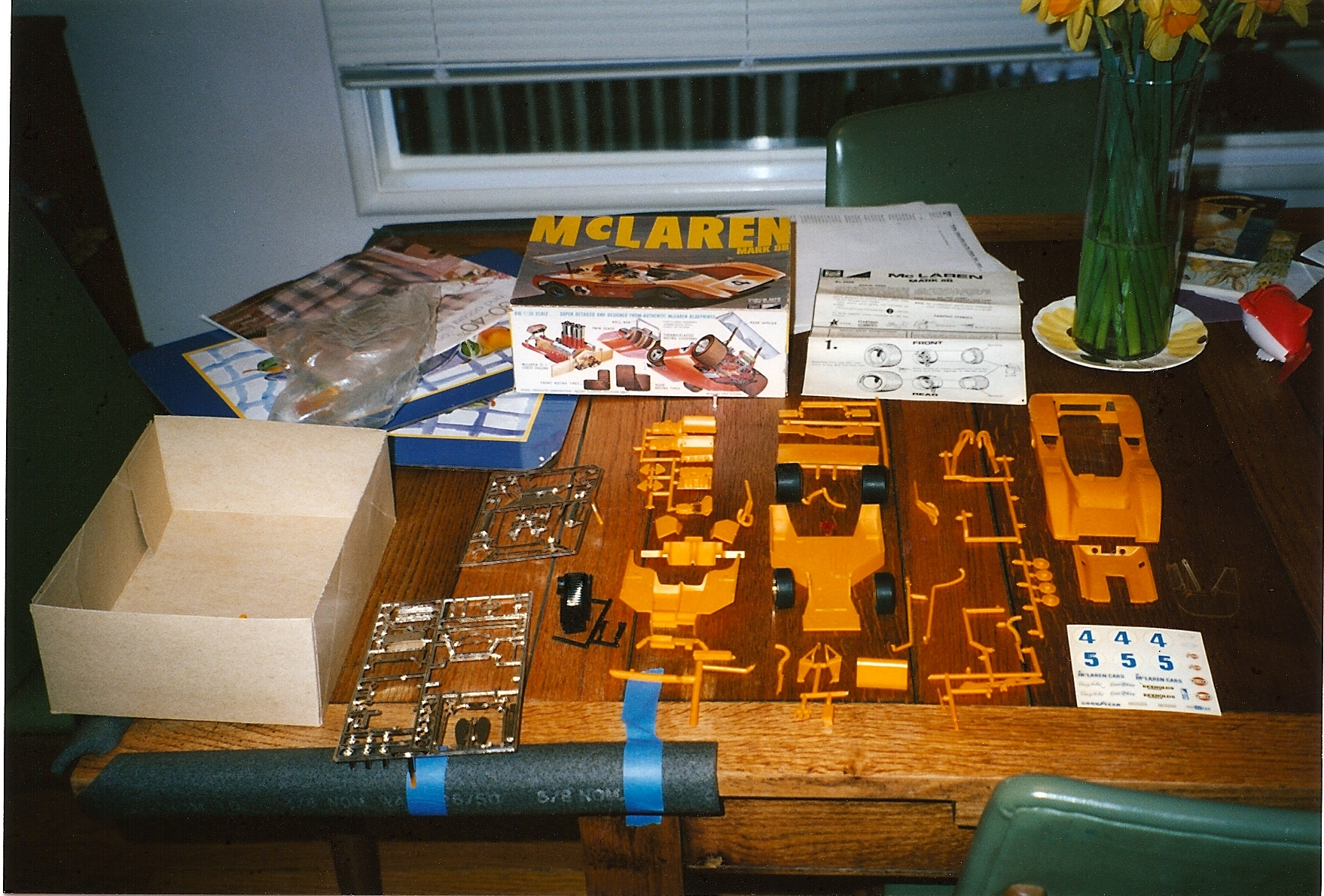
1:20 scale kit of a McLaren Mk-8b Can Am race car

From its inception, MPC offered original toolings of a wide variety of automobiles ranging from classic luxury cars of the 1920s and 1930s, to contemporary dragsters and funny cars, as well as conceptual customs and caricature models developed by well-known racers and customizers such as Dick Branstner (who had built the original full-size 'Color Me Gone' Dodge Truck dragster), George Barris (designer of the TV Batmobile), and Dean Jeffries (designer of the TV Monkeemobile). Along with the production of pre-assembled promotional models, MPC released a regular series of current-model-year auto kits (annuals).

=== Notable products ===
- Gangbusters (1/25 scale classic cars): One of the company's earliest dedicated series, some of the kits included scale gangster figures and accessories such as Tommy guns.

Examples: 1927 Lincoln Roadster; 1928 Lincoln Phaeton; 'Ma Barker's 1932 Chrysler roadster' (complete with 'bullet holes' in the windscreen); 1932 Imperial Custom 8; and a 1932 Chevy Roadster and Panel Truck.

- Connoisseur’s Classics (1/25): Many of the kits in this series were re-boxings of Gangbuster subjects.

Examples: 1932 Chrysler Roadster and LeBaron Imperial; 1927 Lincoln Roadster and 1928 Lincoln Phaeton; and a 1914 Stutz Bearcat (which came with a vacuum-formed display base).

- Switchers (1/25): This series was a continuation of the "3-in-1" concept Toteff had introduced at AMT.

Examples: 1925 Ford Model T roadster; 1927 Ford Model T coach or cab; 1932 Ford roadster or coupe, and the Ford Tudor Sedan or Phaeton.

- TV and movie tie-ins: MPC marketed numerous kits based on popular television shows and movies, most in 1/25 scale.

Examples are Hogan's Heroes Jeep, 'The Sweathogs Dream Machine' featuring John Travolta from Welcome Back Kotter, The Monkees GTO Monkeemobile and 'The Fonz Dreamrod' from Happy Days (a simple reworking of the Monkeemobile); Barnabas's Vampire Van from Dark Shadows, The Fall Guy Chevy pickup, John Milner's yellow Deuce Coupe from American Graffiti, the fiberglass sports car from Hardcastle and McCormick, several variations on Space 1999 vehicles, and the Knight 2000 Firebird from Knight Rider. Other notable tie-ins included the 1914 Stutz Bearcat from the 1971 TV series Bearcats! (later re-purposed as part of the Connoisseur's Classics series), and a number of kits related to The Dukes of Hazzard: General Lee (1969 Dodge Charger), Sheriff Roscoe’s Police Car (1977 Dodge Monaco), Daisy’s Jeep (CJ-7), Daisy’s Roadrunner and Cooter’s Tow Truck. Many of the 'Dukes' kits were re-purposed and re-boxed annuals. A few of them were also modified and marketed as slot cars.

- Airfix re-boxings: Early in its history, MPC developed a licensing agreement with Airfix, releasing some of the British manucturer's 1/32 scale car kits under the MPC logo with unique box art and lithography. Some examples were: Aston Martin DB-5; Jaguar XK-E; Mercedes Benz 280SL; MGB 1600; Porsche Carrera 906 and 917; Ford GT-40: Ferrari 250; Triumph TR-4A; ’30 Bentley 4 ½ Litre; and a 1930 Alfa-Romeo 8C LeMans Grand Prix racer. In the early 1980s, MPC also issued some Airfix 1/72 figures (listed as "HO/OO" scale), notably WWII infantry figures and in their Historama range.
- 1/20 scale cars: From the late 1960s on, MPC tooled a number of kits in larger 1/20 scale. Notable among these were the McLaren M8B and M8D CanAm racers, a popular series of Corvette annuals, the AMC AMX and the Dick Dean-designed Shalako dune buggy. These kits often included highly detailed interiors with realistically simulated vinyl interior upholstery.
- Slot cars: Like many model makers during the mid-1960s, MPC capitalized on the popularity of slot car racing. Using its plastic car bodies, a new 'Dyn-O-Charger' (or simply 'Dyn-O') slot cars series were at first issued in a yellow box. A notable example of the series was the 1957 Corvette, which featured 'Dyn-O-Brakes', special brakes for the front wheels of the slot car.
- Zingers in approximately 1/32 scale: In the early 1970s, MPC ventured into caricature model concepts, similar to Revell's Ed Roth Ratfink custom car kits, or Bill Campbell's Weird-Ohs series for Hawk. Such impish creations were popular at the time and reflected the strong-willed independence of the western and national sub-cultures, which were tied to, first, the beatniks and later, to the hippie scene. MPC's offerings were marketed as 'Zingers', and featured comical stubby and swollen looking vehicles with huge drag racing engines. Examples include Dick Branstner's 'Little Red Truck' (based quite broadly on his 'Color Me Gone' Dodge Truck); the Super Drag Zinger, Super Semi, and Super Dune Zinger; a 1965 Dodge van, a VW microbus, a VW bug, and a Corvette. MPC's caricature models differed from other manufacturer's offerings (such as Aurora) in that they did not feature strange people or animals, but, rather, only oddly distorted vehicles. Thus MPC's answer to the imp phase of hot-rodding was to make the vehicles themselves into caricatures. The Zinger line was reintroduced in 2009 by Round 2 LLC, a recognition of MPC's stature among historic kit-makers.
- Chromies: A series of beginner's-level chrome-finished snap-together kits in 1/32 scale introduced in the mid-1970s. Examples include a 1984 Corvette, and the 'Futuristic Dragster' as well as cars from the Wacky Races animated television series.
- Additional (non-series) car kits in 1/25 scale: Some of MPC's most memorable kits were released as "one-offs" and were not part of a dedicated series. Some examples were: Toyota 2000 GT (with female Japanese driver figure), Ford LeMans J Car (with clear plastic body); Super Judge GTO Funny Car

== Promotional models ==
=== Early products ===
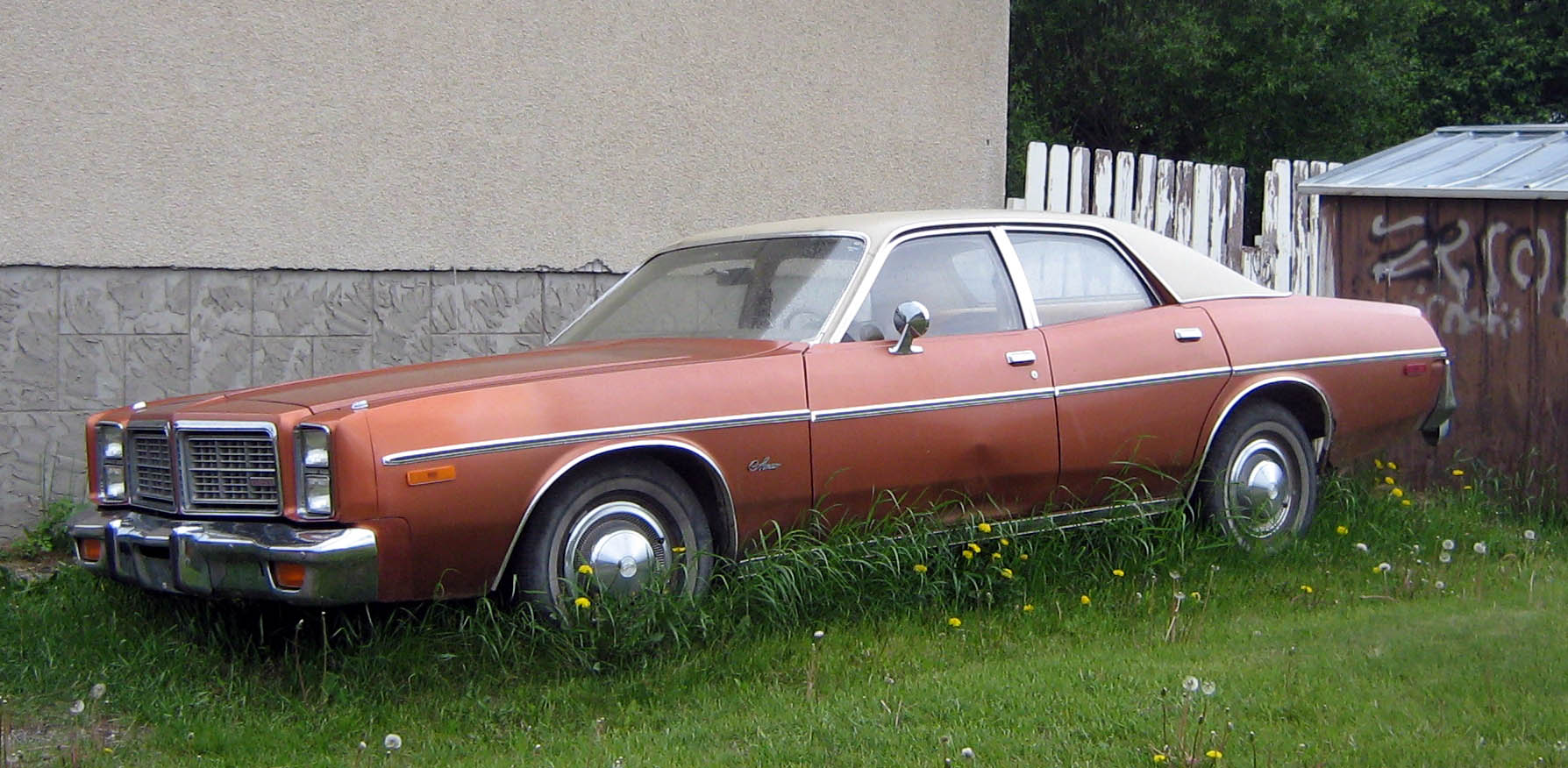
The 1977 Dodge Monaco was one of the models produced by MPC in 1:25 scale

MPC began when George Toteff, a vice president at AMT, left to form his own company. AMT had regularly produced pre-assembled promotional models for the Ford Motor Company while Jo-Han had long-standing relationships with Chrysler and American Motors. Toteff's new company developed license agreements with General Motors Corporation as well as Chrysler. Many of MPC's first promotional offerings from about 1965, represented Chrysler vehicles. One of the company's earliest promos was the 1965 Dodge Coronet. One difference between the Coronet promo and contemporary AMT products was that MPC exhaust systems and rear suspension parts were often highlighted in silver, while AMT's were simply portrayed as detailed one-piece chassis molded the same color as the rest of the car. Later MPC dropped this specific type of exhaust highlighting.

MPC thus was a late-comer to the promotional and model-kit scene, preceded by PMC, AMT and Jo-Han. It is interesting to compare origins – while AMT had its beginnings in manufacturing dealer oriented promotional models first and kits later, by the 1960s, the tables had turned and kits were the big money makers. From this time forward, MPC mainly profited from kits first and promotional models secondarily. Kit makers Aurora, Industro-Motive Corporation (IMC), Pyro, Revell and Monogram had also appeared earlier than MPC, but did not enter the promotional business of pre-assembled models. By the early 1970s, however, MPC was as popular as any of the 'traditional' model makers.

=== Relations with the Big 3 ===
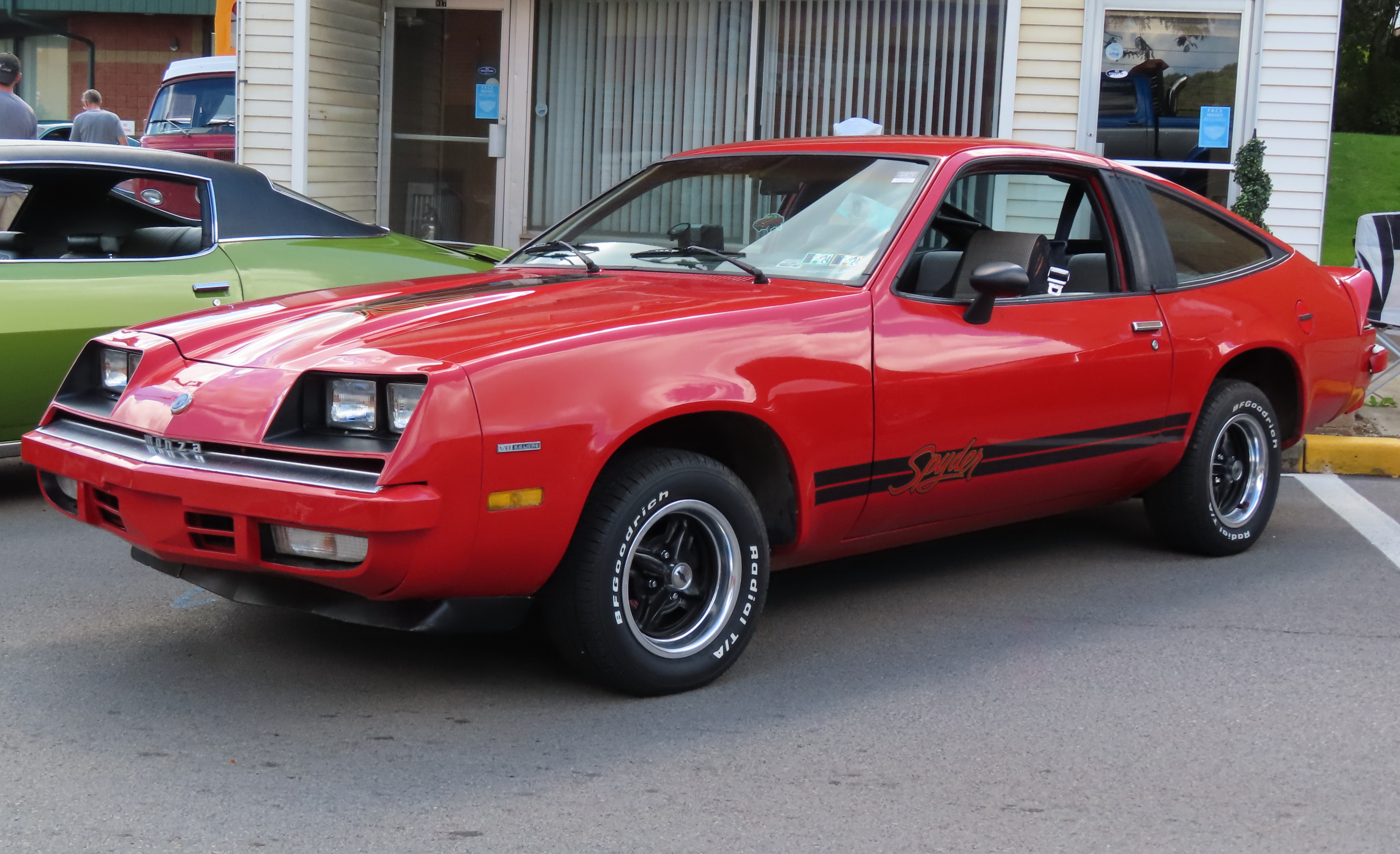
Chevrolet Monza was another promotional model released by MPC

How a model company chose to offer specific brands depended on its relations with the Detroit Big 3 and the specific contracts it could achieve with them. In the 1970s, a variety of GM products were offered by MPC – mostly Chevrolets and Pontiacs, though contracts for some models, like the full-sized Impala changed back and forth between AMT and MPC. MPC achieved the dubious distinction of landing contracts for the Vega throughout its entire span and also offered the later Monza. Since the Vega was not seen as being too exotic a vehicle, Doty notes that there would probably have been no MPC Vega kits without the contract for the promos. Full-sized Pontiacs – LeMans and GTO models – were offered early on while MPC Firebirds, always a fairly popular seller, appeared throughout the entire decade.

Chrysler products in the early 1970s were Chargers and Barracudas. Of particular cultural interest were the Plymouth Duster promos offered in 1971 and 1972. The cars came in boxes brightly colored in the "Rapid Transit System" graphics of that time when cars were actively marketed to youth. In the late 1970s, MPC also offered Chrysler promos of the Volare and the larger Monaco. These were not so popular, but were still accurately crafted with actual metallic model paints and detailed chassis.

While virtually all full-size cars were abandoned as subjects for promotional models after 1970, MPC continued to produce both promotional and kit models for full-size Chevrolets, including Impalas (1971 and 1972), and Caprices (1973 -76). Both these kits and promos are in high demand and garner high prices for original, mint-condition examples.

In the late 1970s, MPC issued a plethora of GM promos, particularly Chevrolet Corvettes and Camaros. A 1978 and 1979 Monte Carlo and Monza were offered. In 1981, the downsized Chevy El Camino was a promotional and Corvettes continued to be offered in the early 1980s – appearing in their simple undecorated white boxes with end flaps labeled – until AMT/Ertl took over such contracts. These MPC Corvettes were manufactured in large numbers and can be easily found in antique malls and flea markets – often for prices between five and fifteen dollars.

== Additional model products ==
- Aircraft Kits

While MPC offered no original aircraft kits of its own, the company maintained a longstanding relationship with the British model maker Airfix. Before 1970, both companies had actively re-boxed each other's car kits under license. Additionally, Airfix' line of aircraft kits in 1/72, 1/48 and 1/24 scale were imported from the U.K. and sold under the MPC logo. Some of the initial 1/72 reissues from about 1970–71 featured an array of extra "customizing features" with a few chrome-plated parts, and strange "psychedelic" decals, similar to the wild custom car kits of the time. Later, MPC would offer several of these same Airfix 1/72 kits as part of its "Profiles" series. Each kit in this series featured a decal sheet with three complete sets of markings. The decals and box art were based on color illustrations from the "Profile Publications" monograph series. In 1981, the Airfix kit range was acquired from the administrators by General Mills. Production was relocated to France and the model range was co-ordinated with MPC. Eventually in 2006 the Airfix name was bought by Hornby.

In the CPG Fundimensions era, MPC carried out a marketing scheme that it called "Golden Opportunity kits." One could collect "Golden Wings" tokens from the airplane kit boxes and turn them in for free models.

- Canadian boxings

MPC boxed some kits specifically for the Canadian market like the "RCMP" 1973 Chevrolet Mountie police car, the 1/20 scale McLaren, and the "Voodoo" Corvette. The Canadian-market offerings were among the first model kits to include both English and French documentation on the boxes and instruction sheets.

- Other models

The company made scale model kits of Schwinn "Sting-Ray" and other bicycles and action figure kits, like the Pirates of the Caribbean and The Haunted Mansion offerings (based on the original rides at Disneyland, and not directly related to the later recent movie series) and a Dungeons & Dragons scene. Additional TV tie-ins included items related to Marvel Comics' The Incredible Hulk, The Six Million Dollar Man and The Bionic Woman ("Bionic Repair Shop"), as well as Dark Shadows. Movie figures from Stephen Sommers' The Mummy trilogy, Alien, The Time Machine, Raiders of the Lost Ark and a series of Star Wars ships also appeared. A unique Aurora-like set of horror figures were the cartoonish "Glo-Heads" of Dracula, Ape Man, the Mummy, and the Werewolf.

MPC also offered a series of kits based on "Hot Curl", a surfer caricature. The kits included Hot Curl, his girlfriend Curl's Gurl, and his brother Hot Shot, a skateboarder; for a time a small figure of Hot Curl was included in MPC's 1929 Ford pickup/woodie kit. MPC also issued two kits based on Tom Medley's "Stroker McGurk" cartoon character: a hot-rodded surfboard and a Tall T, with a phone booth body mounted on a Model T chassis.
