= Jo-Han =

Plastic scale promotional model car manufacturer

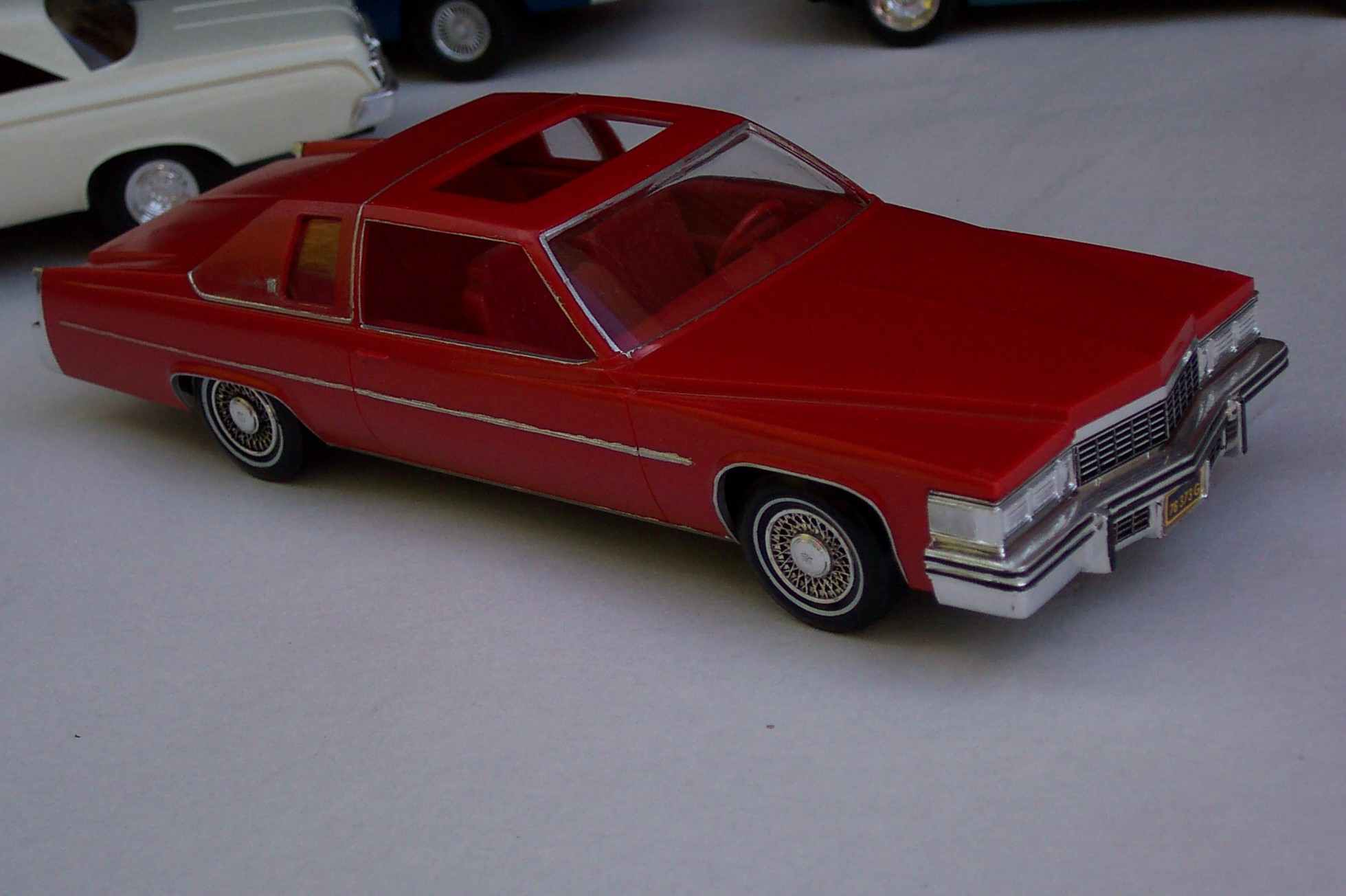
A built 1979 Cadillac kit. This model was also offered as a dealer promo, the last ever designed by Jo-Han.

Jo-Han was a manufacturer of plastic scale promotional model cars and kits originally based in Detroit. The company was founded in 1947 by tool and die maker John Hanley a year before West Gallogly's competing company AMT was formed and about the same time as PMC. After changing ownership a few times, Jo-Han models were sporadically manufactured by Okey Spaulding in Covington, Kentucky, but apparently none have been offered for several years. Originally called Ideal Models, the company produced pre-assembled dealer promotionals and kits for automakers, including models for Chrysler. One of its most notable models was of the 1963 Chrysler Turbine Car, for which Chrysler underwrote the tooling costs.

== History ==
Originally called Ideal Models, Hanley's first products were mid-1950s model aircraft and other promotional items. Some of the early projects included scale model kitchen sets and a training model of Chrysler's fluid drive transmission. This awarded Hanley a contract to produce models for Chrysler.

During the 1950s, the U.S. automakers were commissioning models of their cars from suppliers that included AMT and Jo-Han. Automobile sales people realized that, as one slogan of the time put it, "the little ones sell the big ones". The promise of a free toy car for the kids would entice families into showrooms to view the latest car designs and take them for test drives.

Contracts with General Motors soon followed, and Jo-Han produced Pontiac models for the 1955 model year. Over time, Jo-Han became known more for Chrysler models, though Oldsmobile, Cadillac, Studebaker (often Larks), and American Motors were also well represented making Jo-Han a strong competitor to AMT and later to MPC. Oldsmobile and Cadillac models appeared through the 1960s and 1970s, including the 1962 Oldsmobile compact Cutlass F-85. Their last promotional model made was the 1979 Cadillac Coupe de Ville.

Eventually the company name was changed to Jo-Han Models because of the already existing Ideal Toy Company. The new name reflected the first two letters of the founder's first name and the first three letters of his last name. Similar to how AMT simultaneously used the SMP brand name, Jo-Han's 1955 Pontiac Star Chief two door and four door sedan promotional models also continued to use the Ideal name during the transition, but this was the last year for the Ideal name.

=== Golden Age of models and kits ===
The 1950s and 1960s are considered a "golden age" for promotional models and kits, with pre-assembled dealer promotionals coming first around 1950, then kits adding profit in the late-1950s. Most kits were known as "annuals" by hobbyists, and followed the bigger business of promos that represented the new cars introduced at the beginning of each model year. Moreover, model cars were on the forefront of hobbies at that time with a wide range and variety available from numerous manufactures. Companies that made promos for the automakers included JoHan, Revell, Monogram, Lindberg and MPC. The model companies followed up with hundreds of different model cars and trucks for retail markets. The industry expanded as total annual sales of model kits increased from $6 million in 1956 to more than $150 million by 1962. Model car collecting and building were an important part of being an automobile enthusiast in the 1960s. Besides the standard factory built models, plastic kits were available that represented race and custom forms of the original promo editions.

=== Model details ===
Though AMT started using non-warping polystyrene plastic as opposed to cellulose acetate on some of their 1961 models, Jo-Han promotional models did not make a total change to styrene until production of their 1964 models. The new styrene held its shape over time. Often, the upward warping of the outward edges of front fenders above a non-warped styrene chrome grille was particularly pronounced on Jo-Han models, and sometimes called the "Jo-Han smile."

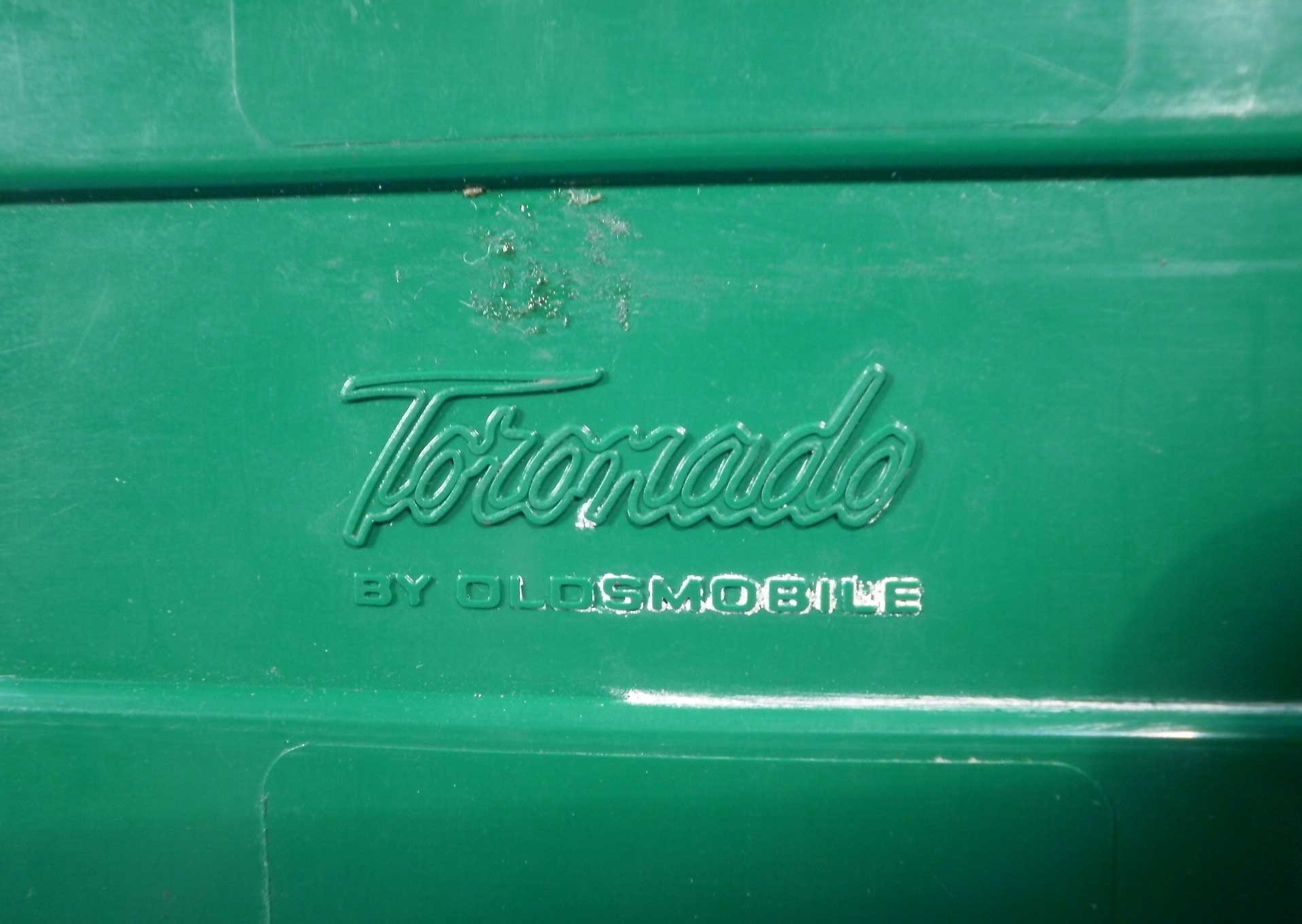
The central chassis from 1966 Toronado - devoid of detail except for the car name. Non-detailing of the chassis saved production money and was common. By this time, AMT and MPC models, by contrast, nearly always had detailed chassis. Emphasizing its promotional quality, the Jo-Han name is not found anywhere on this Toronado.

Usually there were no opening features, but Jo-Han plastic models were intricately detailed, with accurate body scripts, trim, and emblems, as well as seat and dashboard highlights. Intricate details would change from year to year according to annual design changes and specifications of the real cars produced. One model expert, and former employee of Jo-Han, Dennis Doty, reported how the company would mix paints to be applied to the models in as near to the same colors as used by the actual manufacturers. One particularly difficult paint to match for the 1977 Cadillacs was Saffron metallic. Thus, normally automobile companies did not supply the actual paints to the promo manufacturers.

On most Jo-Han models, especially on friction models, chassis detail was often absent, lowering tooling expense for a company not quite so large as AMT or the later MPC. Commonly, the chassis base was just an indented slab with the Jo-Han company name and "Detroit, Michigan", but sometimes the company name was completely absent and only the GM or other car logo was present - emphasizing the real manufacturer instead of Jo-Han, the model maker. Some later contracts, however, added complete chassis detail as seen in the 1970 Ford Maverick, and the Cadillac Coupe DeVille and Eldorado promotionals from the later 1970s. On the 1965 and 1966 full sized Chrysler promos, Jo-Han outdid themselves by offering working torsion bars, but these were dropped for 1967 Apart from the often plain chassis, models were exact duplicates of the real thing in 1/25 scale. Wheels also carried accurate detail, including authentic and official logos and scripts in hubcap centers.

== Product lines ==
=== Marketing and model variety ===
Through the 1950s, the promo business was of primary importance to the model makers. Jo-Han and others also offered their models in more simplified form to dime-stores like G. C. Murphy's or Zayre's. These offerings were less likely to have official Big 3 paint schemes or the dealer boxes and were often seen with friction motors added for play value. Many promos, like the 1967–1968 Imperial were offered as promos and as frictions, but not seen in kit form.

Jo-Han models were especially popular through the 1960s, offering some of the most accurately detailed scale replicas available in plastic. Detroit's offerings were well represented by the company in both kit and dealer "promo" form. While most products were Chrysler, AMC, and GM, some Fords that AMT did not have did make their way to Jo-Han such as the Ford Maverick and Gran Torino in their introductory years (1970 and 1972). The Maverick was available molded in at least five colors: medium green, dusty rose (kind of a rosy gray), butterscotch, light blue, and red. The Maverick was often available in magazines like National Geographic offered for free or limited cost just by cutting out, completing and mailing in the ad. As promotions for Ford, the ads did not mention Jo-Han.

Jo-Han promo boxes took a variety of forms. One of the most often seen in the early 1960s was a red, white and blue striped box with a clear plastic window in the shape of a car body. Later, X-El Products boxes, like later MPC ones, were simple white boxes with names stamped on the end flaps.

Both AMT and Jo-Han introduced 1/25 scale NASCAR race car models to "a hungry modeling public." The Jo-Han kits featured "frame-pac" construction that arranged the parts trees in the box in a way to prevent the parts from rubbing against each other.

As the promotional model business tapered off in the 1970s, it became financially difficult for Jo-Han to develop new tooling. The last new model was of the 1977 Cadillac, which was continued as both the 1978 and 1979 Coupe deVille in promo and snap-kit form.

=== Chrysler Turbine car ===
The 1963 Chrysler Turbine Car was an experimental gas turbine-powered coupe of which 55 were made. The "Ghia" Turbines (as they were often known internally because of the Italian styling shop's production of the bodies) were put into the hands of only 203 real customers for testing and PR goodwill. This was a particular boon for Jo-Han which was chosen to make the plastic promotional. Tooling for the model cost at least $250,000 at the time and Chrysler completely underwrote the expense. As with most promotional models, the car was to be supplied to Chrysler dealers and given to the best customer prospects - though not for the Turbine car itself - the 50 produced (five being test vehicles) were not for sale. Boxes of twelve to twenty-four of the models were often left with the families who used the car. The bronze metallic promotional models (with black vinyl roofs) were also distributed to attendees at Chrysler's pavilion in the 1964 New York World's Fair.

Two kit versions of the Chrysler Turbine Car were significant - a standard bronze colored promotional authentic to the cars used by the public, and a white version that was the color of one of the test mules, which was also lent for the making of the movie The Lively Set. This model had a friction motor and fewer than 500 were produced. Some of the Turbine models were nearly as incredible as the real car, with such details as folding seats, opening doors, hood, deck lid, and steerable front wheels. Chassis detail was remarkable, accurately depicting the huge ducting passages running the length of the car needed to expel the turbine's waste gasses.

Later, in the 1980s and 1990s the standard Ghia turbine was reproduced both as a kit and a simple promotional - sans moving parts. In the mid-1980s, X-EL Products, still sold the Jo-Han Chrysler Turbine model. In 1992, 1,000 special Chrysler Ghia Turbine models were produced in black, a color the real car was never painted.

The original packaging of the model showed the car from various angles and a photo of the turbine engine on the box. An explanation of turbine power in general was written on the box, with an emphasis that it was important that a gas turbine engine "be made from low-cost readily available materials" even though the engine was in actuality fairly expensive compared to conventional piston driven internal combustion engines. Further, the box spoke of the flexibility of the engine in its ability to use a variety of different types of fuels and Chrysler encouraged those in possession of the model to "watch" for the real car, which "will soon be on the streets and highways of America".

=== American Motors ===
American Motors Corporation was a common client of Jo-Han, producing mainly 1/25 scale promo models. 1959 and 1960 Rambler station wagons were produced by Jo-Han. These were not offered in kit form - but the demand was not as great for station wagon kits. These were later re-issued by X-El Products and Okey Spaulding in the 1990s and early 2000s. Though perhaps not as collectible, the later issues were made in non-warping styrene plastic. The company also made Rambler Classic sedans and American convertibles for 1963–1965, however, the 1962 through 1964 versions were of a slightly larger 1:24 scale, apparently AMC wanted them that way. Also interesting is that both the dealer promo and the dimestore versions of these Classics came with friction motors - as usually the promo versions did not.

One AMC model of interest was a detailed promotional for the 1965 and 1966 AMC Marlin fastbacks - a dramatic new variation on the Classic. The two years' models differ in their grilles and the removal of the Rambler name on the 1966 version. A friction model was also available for the 1966 Marlin. The promos were finished in a variety of single and two-tone color combinations according to factory available hues. One common color was light turquoise molded plastic with roof and rear fastback deck colored AMC metallic blue-green. As the 1966 model year neared its end and all-new cars for 1967 were being introduced, AMC dealers contributed thousands of leftover Marlin promos to institutions such as children's hospitals and orphanages. The 1966 promos are now desirable and they command premium prices. Value for an individual model can be $200 to $400 for mint, in-the-box specimens with hood ornament intact.

Jo-Han also produced 1/25-scale plastic kits of the 1966 Marlin, (Jo-Han # C1900) and it was reissued in the mid-1970s in the "U.S.A. Oldies" series (Jo-Han # C-3666). They are based on the promotional models, but are less valuable today. Steve Magnante of Hot Rod wrote that these unassembled model kits are increasing in value.

An example of the rush of plastic model suppliers to produce promos for the next model year was seen in the Jo-Han 1968 AMC Ambassador convertible, a car never manufactured in reality because AMC discontinued the convertible body style from the Ambassador line after the 1967 model year. Oddly, though, Jo-Han's Ambassador promo led to one of the few kits that Jo-Han made that was not offered as a promo first. This was the 1970 Rebel Machine. An insert could be taken out of the Ambassador promo chassis to make the shorter wheelbase models like the Rebel - which was the case here.

=== Jo-Han Classics ===
A bit less well known were the Classic series of 1:25 scale vehicles offered by Jo-Han. These were cars of the 1930s like the 1931 Cadillac in Town Brougham, Phaeton or Cabriolet, the 1934 Mercedes-Benz 540K in cabriolet or hard top limousine. Though as detailed as any classic model line from any manufacturer, the Classic line did not endure long and was limited to only a few offerings.

== Decline ==
A decrease in demand for promotionals occurred through the 1970s. Earlier hobbies of America's youth such as model building and bicycle riding were gradually replaced by video games, home movies, iPods and the Internet. Still, Jo-Han made several models, such as the 1972 Ford Torino that the company made in promo form. This model was reissued in 1976 as a snap-kit in both stock and NASCAR versions. Jo-Han was also the last of the promotional producers to make models with a friction motor.

Jo-Han limped through the 1980s re-issuing old kits and promos. The company gave up trying to retail its models and set up a branch company called X-El Products to sell reissued promos. The X-El reissues have sometimes been passed off as originals in antique malls and flea markets. The X-El Products era was an ironic time. Models were carefully prepared and respected by collectors, but there was no capital to develop new products, so the company fell into decline. One consumer purchase update card sent by X-El Products to buyers in 1988 encouraged patience when waiting for models that were ordered, saying, "These promos are not done on a mass production basis. They are practically made to order and babied from start to finish." This is another way of saying that Jo-Han did not have the resources to improve their service. Nevertheless, the reproductions from this time have also escalated in collector value and were as well rendered as the original period promos, done with accurate color schemes.

In 1991, the company was purchased by Seville Enterprises, a manufacturer of plastic parts for the auto industry. Seville, at one time located in Romeo, Michigan, once again offered some kits and promos, mainly by mail order, from original Jo-Han dies. A few one-off paint combinations were also known to have been created by Seville during these years. Plans to produce an all-new GM-approved promotional of the new 1992 Cadillac Seville STS were soon scrapped, however due to lack of funding for the tooling required.In 1998 Seville Enterprises filed for Bankruptcy protection and liquidated all assets.

In 2000, Jo-Han was supposedly purchased from the ailing Seville by Okey Spaulding, a resin parts producer from Covington, Kentucky. Although no record of transfer was ever recorded, A new company, JoHan Models LLC (without the traditional hyphen) was formed. Through about 2005, Spaulding produced a few of the original models in limited quantities, including the 1956 Plymouth, 1959 Rambler station wagon, some 1950s Oldsmobiles and Pontiacs. For a one-man operation, Spaulding's attention to detail could be remarkable and he sold models through his website for a time. Spaulding apparently still sells parts, and as of 2010 all sales were done through the site emodelcars.com, but no models have been listed there for many years. It also appears most of the original model molds have been scrapped or stolen over time as no kits have been produced in 20 or more years.
