= Friction motor =

Mechanism used to propel toys

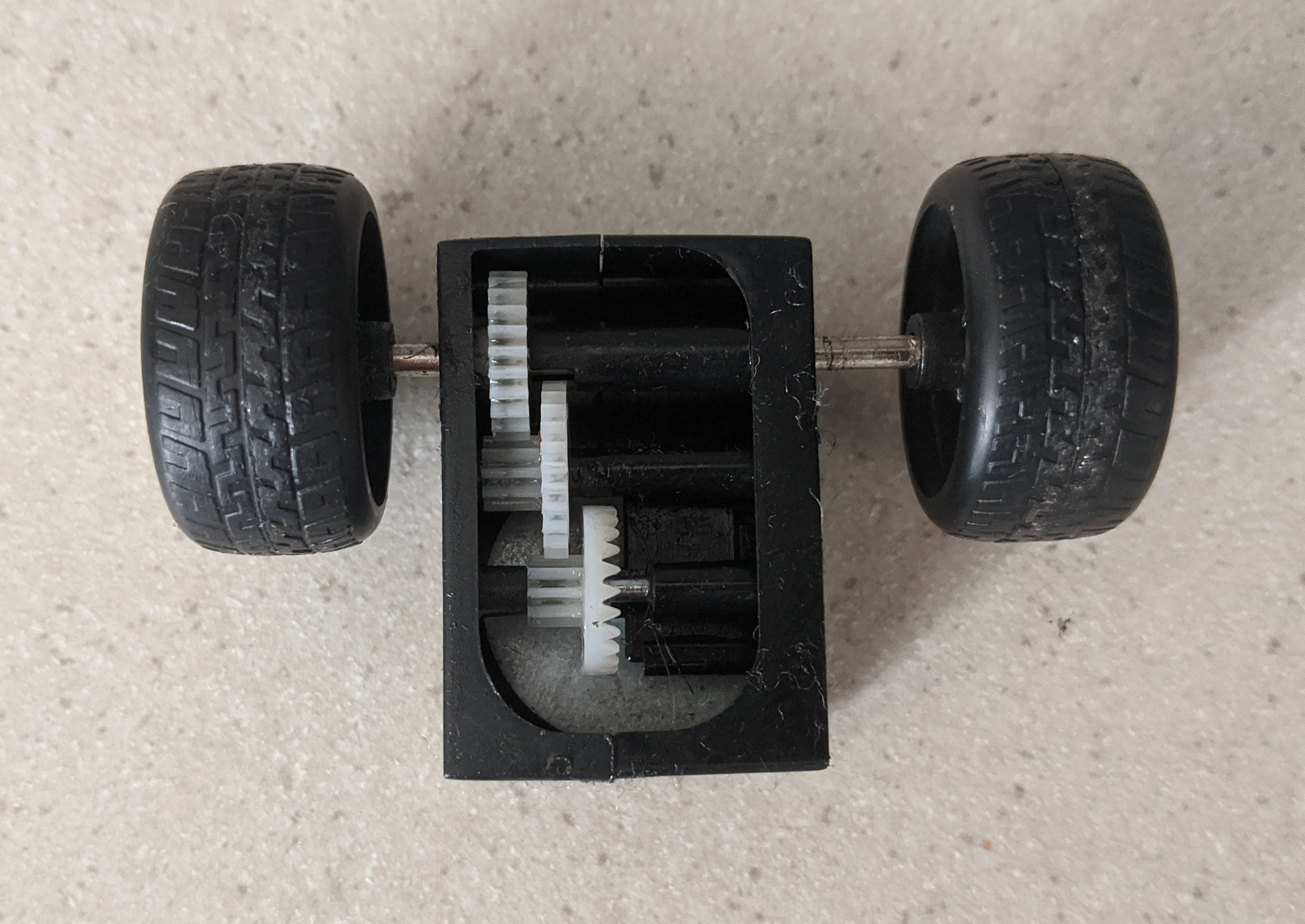
Inside a friction motor on a toy car. Note that the drive wheels are connected via a low gear ratio to a flywheel (bottom).

A friction motor is a simple mechanism to propel toy cars, trucks, trains, action figures and similar toys. The motor consists of a large flywheel which is connected to the drive wheels of the toy via a gear train with very low gear ratio, so that the flywheel revolves much faster than the wheels. The flywheel's axis is perpendicular to the direction in which the toy faces and in which it moves. When the toy is pushed forward, the drive wheels engage the flywheel. If higher energies are desired, pushing the vehicle forward repeatedly spins this flywheel up to greater speed. When let go, the flywheel drives the vehicle forward. Energy which is input by pushing the car is stored by the flywheel as rotational kinetic energy and can propel the toy after it is released. It is friction between the tyres and the surface on which the vehicle is operating which enables the energy input process, thus giving the name "friction motor" to the device.

As the flywheel, unlike the spring of a pullback motor, is continuously rotating, the motor may be "pumped up" by pushing the car repeatedly forward. In some cases, the cars work both in forward and reverse; in other cases, a one-way clutch can disengage a component in the gear assembly to prevent input of rotational effort in the reverse sense. Some used a zip cord pulled from the vehicle body to accelerate the flywheel directly. Another system was the Turbo Tower of Power (TTP) in which air expelled from a hand-operated pump pushed turbine blades on the flywheel's rim.

These toys were especially popular in the 1960s to 1980s though they continue to be available today.
