= IFMAR 1:8 IC Off-Road World Championship =

World championship radio controlled car race

- First race: 1986
- Duration: 60 minutes _{(final)} 30 minutes _{(to semi-finals)} 20 minutes _{(to 1/16 sub-finals)}
- Most wins (driver): Davide Ongaro (3)
- Most wins (manufacturer): Kyosho (8)

Circuit information
- Surface: Dirt

The IFMAR World Championship for 1:8th IC Off-Road Cars (officially "IFMAR 1:8 IC Off-Road World Championship", nicknamed Nitro Buggy Worlds and initially referred to as the Rallycross Worlds, it radio controlled car event authorised by the International Federation of Model Auto Racing (IFMAR). It takes place every even year since 1986, alternating with the IFMAR 1:10 Electric Off-Road World Championships.

The event is open exclusively to 1:8 scale off-road buggies running on nitromethanol mix fuel; these are 4WD cars characterized by its large wheels designed for off-road driving and enclosed single-seater bodyshell with large rear spoiler with two cutouts; at the rear to enable a cylinder head to protrude out at the back and the other, at the front to enable quick refueling. In 2024 the IFMAR 1:8 Electric Off-Road World Championship was added to the event as battery and motor technology improved.

== Venues ==
| Edition | | | Venue | | | | Competitors | | | Ref. |
| No. | Date | Year | Bloc | Club / Venue | Location | Country | No. | Nats | Block | Ref. |
|---|---|---|---|---|---|---|---|---|---|---|
| 1 | | 1986 | EFRA | Radio Automobile Club de Grenoble / Mini Circuit de Montbonnot | Grenoble | France | | | | |
| 2 | | 1988 | EFRA | Mantua Models | Mantua | Italy | | | | |
| 3 | | 1990 | FEMCA | Maxima Racing Club | Bangkok | Thailand | | | | |
| 4 | | 1992 | EFRA | MSC Eschbach | Usingen, Eschbach | Germany | | | | |
| 5 | | 1994 | EFRA | | Kirchschlag in der Buckligen Welt | Austria | | | | |
| 6 | | 1996 | EFRA | National Motor Museum | Beaulieu, Hampshire | United Kingdom | | | | |
| 7 | | 1998 | EFRA | Secção de Radiomodelismo da Associação Académica de Coimbra / Mini Autódromo do Estádio Universitário de Coimbra | Coimbra | Portugal | | | | |
| 8 | | 2000 | ROAR | Silverton Hotel | Las Vegas, Nevada | United States | 150 | 23 | 5 | |
| 9 | | 2002 | FAMAR | Green Mountain Raceway | Punta del Este | Uruguay | | | | |
| 10 | 2-8 Aug. | 2004 | EFRA | Furulund RC Club / Fururing Raceway | Furulund | Sweden | 150 | 24 | 4 | |
| 11 | 2-5 Mar. | 2006 | FEMCA | JA Team / Ancol R/C Circuit, Ancol Dreamland | Jakarta | Indonesia | | | | |
| 12 | | 2008 | ROAR | The Farm 2 R/C Raceway | Charlotte, North Carolina | United States | | | | |
| 13 | | 2010 | FEMCA | Pattaya RC Powerboat Track | Pattaya | Thailand | | | | |
| 14 | | 2012 | FAMAR | Speed Paradise | Ciudad Evita, Buenos Aires | Argentina | 146 | 24 | 5 | |
| 15 | | 2014 | EFRA | Messina World / Pista Naxos World | Giardini Naxos, Sicily | Italy | 162 | 33 | 6 | |
| 16 | | 2016 | ROAR | RC Tracks of Las Vegas | Las Vegas, Nevada | United States | 234 | | | |
| 17 | 1-10 Nov. | 2018 | FEMCA | Model Off-Road Buggy Club of Western Australia, Whiteman Park | Perth, Western Australia | Australia | 164 | 26 | 6 | |
| N/A | | 2020 | FAMAR | Beeight Track / RCCM Beeight Racing | Cianorte, Paraná | Brazil | | | | |
| 18 | 4-11 Sept. | 2022 | EFRA | RC-Redován | Redován, Alicante | Spain | 180 | 34 | 5 | |
| N/A | 5-15 Sept. | 2024 | | Casa Raceway | Sao Paulo | Brazil | CANCELLED | | | (Note: Hosting duties had originally been given to Casa Raceway, Sao Paulo in Brasil in August 2023 but in March 2024, they were unable to provide hosting duties due to not being given permits from city governments. For hosting duties to represent FAMAR bloc, Bolivia was immediately considered, followed by Mexico and 2012 hosts Argentina. After consideration by IFMAR board of directors, it was decided that to return to EFRA bloc and the 2022 offer to host due to only having 5 months notice.) |
| 19 | 8-15 Sept. | 2024 | EFRA | Club Radio Control Redován / RC-Redován | Redován, Alicante | Spain | 180 | 32 | 4 | |
| 20 | 26 Sep - 3 Oct | 2026 | ROAR | Thornhill Racing Circuit | Texas | United States | 182 | 33 | 4 | |

== Winners ==
| Year | Name | Car | | Motor | | Tyres | Transmitter | | | Servos | | | Source | Report |
| Year | Name | Make | Model | Make | Model | | Make | Model | Receiver | Make | Steering | Throttle | Source | Report |
|---|---|---|---|---|---|---|---|---|---|---|---|---|---|---|
| 1986 | (France) Frédéric Veysseyre | Yankee Racing | 86 | Cipolla | Yankee Master | | Multiplex | Yankee Combi Plus | | | | | | Report |
| 1988 | (Italy) Maurizio Monesi | Garbo | Roadfighter | Mantua | T4 | | Simprop | | | | | | | Report |
| 1990 | (Japan) Koji Sanada | Mugen | Super Sport | Novarossi | | Mugen | Sanwa | Machine 1 | | Contest | HH | HH | | Report |
| 1992 | (Japan) Kunihiro Toge | Kyosho | Inferno | OS Max | 21 RX-B | SLD | Sanwa | M-Zechs | | Sanwa | ERG XS | ERG XT | | Report |
| 1994 | (Italy) Maurizio Monesi | Kyosho | Turbo Inferno | OPS | | Cournon | Futaba | FF3 | | | | | | Report |
| 1996 | (Italy) Alex Laffranchi | Kyosho | Inferno MP5 | Picco | P6 | Medial Pro | KO Propo | EX-10 | | | | | | Report |
| 1998 | (Germany) Daniel Reckward | Kyosho | Inferno MP6 Evo | RB | WS7 | Medial Pro | KO Propo | EX-1 Mars | | | | | | Report |
| 2000 | (Japan) Yuichi Kanai | Kyosho | Inferno MP7.5 | RB | WS7 Worlds | Pro-Line [Crime Figher] | Futaba | 3CVS | | | | | | Report |
| 2002 | (United States) Greg Degani | Kyosho | Inferno MP7.5 Kanai 2 | OS Max | 21 RZ-V01B | Pro-Line [Knuckle] | Futaba | 3PJ | | | | | | Report |
| 2004 | (France) Guillaume Vray | Mugen | MBX-5 Pro Spec | RB | WS7II | Pro-Line [Knuckles 2.0] | Futaba | | | | | | | Report |
| 2006 | (United States) Mark Pavidis | Kyosho | Inferno MP777 WC | OS Speed | 21VZ-B V-Spec | Pro-Line [Bow Tie XTR] | Futaba | 3PKS | | | | | | Report |
| 2008 | (Japan) Atsushi Hara | Hot Bodies | D8 | OS Speed | 21VZ-B V-Spec II | Pro-Line [Revolver] | Futaba | PK4 | | Futaba | BLS 353 | S9351 | | Report |
| 2010 | (United States) Cody King | Kyosho | Inferno MP9 TKI2 | Orion | Alpha ABI | AKA | KO Propo | EX-10 Eurus | | | | | | Report |
| 2012 | (Spain) Robert Batlle | Mugen | MBX-7 | Novarossi | Plus.21-4BTTS | Procircuit | Futaba | 4PKS-R | | Futaba | | | | Report |
| 2014 | (Canada) Ty Tessmann | Hot Bodies | D812 | OS Speed | B2101 | Pro-Line | Airtronics | M12 | | Futaba | | | | Report |
| 2016 | (Sweden) David Ronnefalk | HB Racing | D815 V2 | Orion | CRF 21 7 Port Tuned | AKA | Sanwa | M12S | | Savox | | | | Report |
| 2018 | (Italy) Davide Ongaro | Associated | RC8B3.1 | LRP | ZZ.21c | AKA | Sanwa | EXZES-ZZ | | Highest | | | | Report |
| 2020 | Postponed, then cancelled due to the COVID-19 pandemic | | | | | | | | | | | | (Note: Because of the COVID-19 pandemic which occurred prior to the championships, the event is postponed to 2022. See also Impact of the COVID-19 pandemic on motorsport and COVID-19 pandemic in Brazil.) | |
| 2022 | (Italy) Davide Ongaro | Associated | RC8B4 | OS | B21 Ongaro Edition | AKA | Sanwa | EXZES-ZZ | | | | | | Report |
| 2024 | (Italy) Davide Ongaro | Associated | RC8B4.1 | OS | B21 Ongaro Edition | Matrix | Sanwa | Exzes ZZ | | Sanwa | PGS-XR II | PGS-XR II | | Report |
| 2026 | (Sweden) David Ronnefalk | X-Ray | XB8 | FX | K303L | Hot Race | Sanwa | M17S | | Hitec | DB951WP | DB951WP | | Report |

== Statistics ==
=== Most Wins ===
==== Drivers ====
| Rank | Driver | Wins |
|---|---|---|
| 1 | (Italy) Davide Ongaro | 3 |
| 2 | (Italy) Maurizio Monesi | 2 |
| 2 | (Sweden) David Ronnefalk | 2 |
| 4 | (France) Frédéric Veysseyre | 1 |
| 4 | (Japan) Koji Sanada | 1 |
| 4 | (Japan) Kunihiro Toge | 1 |
| 4 | (Italy) Alex Laffranchi | 1 |
| 4 | (Germany) Daniel Reckward | 1 |
| 4 | (Japan) Yuichi Kanai | 1 |
| 4 | (United States) Greg Degani | 1 |
| 4 | (France) Guillaume Vray | 1 |
| 4 | (United States) Mark Pavidis | 1 |
| 4 | (Japan) Atsushi Hara | 1 |
| 4 | (United States) Cody King | 1 |
| 4 | (Spain) Robert Batlle | 1 |
| 4 | (Canada) Ty Tessmann | 1 |

==== Car manufacturers ====
| Rank | Manufacturer | Wins |
|---|---|---|
| 1 | (Japan) Kyosho | 8 |
| 2 | (Japan) Mugen Seiki | 3 |
| 2 | (Switzerland) HB Racing (Note: Up to 2016, operated as Hot Bodies.) | 3 |
| 2 | (United States) Team Associated | 3 |
| 5 | (France) Yankee | 1 |
| 5 | (Italy) Garbo | 1 |
| 5 | (Slovakia) X-Ray | 1 |

==== Engines ====
| Rank | Manufacturer | Wins |
|---|---|---|
| 1 | (Japan) O.S. Engines | 7 |
| 2 | (France) RB Products | 3 |
| 3 | (Italy) Novarossi | 2 |
| 3 | (Switzerland) Team Orion | 2 |
| 5 | (Italy) Cipolla | 1 |
| 5 | (Italy) Mantua | 1 |
| 5 | (Italy) OPS | 1 |
| 5 | (Italy) Picco | 1 |
| 5 | (Germany) LRP electronic | 1 |
| 5 | (Slovakia) FX | 1 |

==== Transmitters ====
| Rank | Manufacturer | Wins |
|---|---|---|
| 1 | (Japan) Futaba | 7 |
| 1 | (Japan) Sanwa | 7 |
| 3 | (Japan) KO Propo | 3 |
| 1 | (Germany) Multiplex | 2 |
| 1 | (Germany) Simprop | 2 |

==== By Member Blocs (Drivers) ====
| Rank | Bloc | Wins |
|---|---|---|
| 1 | EFRA | 11 |
| 2 | FEMCA | 4 |
| 2 | ROAR | 4 |
| 4 | FAMAR | 0 |

==== Win(s) by Nations (Drivers) ====
| Rank | Nation | Wins |
|---|---|---|
| 1 | Italy | 6 |
| 2 | Japan | 4 |
| 3 | United States | 3 |
| 4 | France | 2 |
| 4 | Sweden | 2 |
| 6 | Germany | 1 |
| 6 | Spain | 1 |
| 6 | Canada | 1 |

=== Most represented in final ===
Note: Entries expanded to accommodate 12 drivers (from 10 in previous years) as of 2008, those with more than 50% represented are listed. Italics represents in which a driver of the country who didn't win, italics on nationalities indicate host nation.

==== Nations (drivers) ====
| Rank | Total | Nation | Year |
|---|---|---|---|
| 1 | 8 | United States | 2008 |
| 2 | 7 | France | 1986 |
| 2 | 7 | Japan | 1990 |
| 2 | 7 | Japan | 1992 |
| 2 | 7 | United States | 2006 |
| 2 | 7 | United States | 2010 |
| 2 | 7 | United States | 2014 |
| 7 | 6 | United States | 2012 |
| 5 | 5 | Italy | 1996 |
| 5 | 5 | United States | 2000 |

==== Car manufacturers ====
| Rank | Total | Nation | Year | % |
|---|---|---|---|---|
| 1 | 8 | (Japan) Kyosho | 1992 | 80% |
| 1 | 8 | (Japan) Kyosho | 2000 | 80% |
| 3 | 6 | (Japan) Kyosho | 1990 | 60% |
| 3 | 6 | (Japan) Kyosho | 2002 | 60% |
| 8 | 5 | (France) Yankee | 1986 | 50% |
| 8 | 5 | (Japan) Mugen Seiki | 1994 | 50% |
