= Tower Hobbies =

American e-commerce hobby product retailer

Tower Hobbies is an American e-commerce hobby product retailer founded in 1971 by Bruce Holecek, a radio control (RC) model hobby enthusiast. Tower Hobbies is a division of Horizon Hobby, LLC and is headquartered in Champaign, Illinois, United States. The company serves customers in more than 50 countries.

== History ==
=== Formation and Early Years — 1971 Through 1974 ===
Tower Hobbies was formed in 1971 when Bruce Holecek, an avid radio control (RC) hobbyist and engineering student at the University of Illinois Urbana-Champaign, decided to start his own mail-order RC product company. Popular interest in RC cars was gaining momentum at the time.

Holecek launched his company using $800 from his own savings. He chose the name Tower Hobbies because he was living in Illini Tower student housing when he purchased his first small inventory of RC products and began to advertise sales by mail. Orders were shipped from the basement of the Holecek family home by his brother Mark, a high school student who became a partner in the company. Bruce Holecek said that he dreamed of creating "the largest and finest hobby mail-order company in the world."

When Mark Holecek entered the University of Illinois as a general engineering student and Bruce married his wife Jeri, all of Tower Hobbies’ operations were moved to Champaign, Illinois.

=== Growth and Innovations — 1975 Through 1979 ===
After earning a Master of Business Administration degree, Bruce Holecek split his time between teaching general engineering at the University of Illinois and running Tower Hobbies with Jeri from their home. In 1975 Tower Hobbies’ sales passed the one million dollar mark, giving Bruce and Jeri the means to move the company into its own building for the first time.

Mark Holecek finished his degree in 1976 and sold his interest in Tower Hobbies to Bruce. Tower Hobbies’ sales grew to 4.8 million dollars in 1978, making it the largest mail-order radio control product retailer in the hobby industry.

In addition to purchasing products wholesale and selling them to RC hobbyists, Tower Hobbies began to develop its own Tower Hobbies brand merchandise and to explore innovative ways of providing high-quality customer service.

Tower Hobbies was the first mail-order company in the radio control hobby industry to offer direct-dial, toll-free, 1-800 WATS phone lines for ordering and customer service.

Tower Hobbies was also the first mail-order company in the RC hobby to use an in-house IBM mainframe computer to process orders and track inventory.

By the late 1970s, Tower Hobbies stocked radio control hobby products from over 150 different manufacturers and had more than 35,000 active customers. The company’s warehouse processed over 350 packages every day.

=== Expansion and Creation of Hobbico — 1980s and 1990s ===
In 1980, Tower Hobbies moved into a newly built, 42,000-square-foot office and warehouse facility at Interstate Research Park in Champaign. The expansion allowed the company to increase its inventory level from two million to well over three million dollars.

At this point, Tower Hobbies had 100 employees and served more than 100,000 customers. The company increased its number of phone lines by 50% and expanded the coverage of its toll-free WATS lines to reach more than 1,000 customers living in Alaska and Hawaii.

Tower Hobbies published a print catalog of its RC products each year, and by 1980 the Tower Hobbies Catalog had grown to 406 pages. The radio control products available from Tower Hobbies included "airplanes, helicopters, boats, cars, tanks, motorcycles, and now even an R/C blimp…along with all the engines, radios, accessories, and equipment necessary to make these models complete." Tower Hobbies carried hobby products manufactured in the United States, Japan, and West Germany. All active customers on the Tower Hobbies mailing list received the catalog, as well as a bi-monthly Super Special Sheet spotlighting new and sale-priced items.

By the fall of 1982, Tower Hobbies was the world’s biggest mail-order retailer of radio-controlled airplane and boat models, grossing more than $15 million a year.

Champaign businessman and real estate developer Clint Atkins approached the Holeceks in 1984 with an offer to buy Tower Hobbies. The deal would give Bruce Holecek the authority to continue running the company, the capital to continue its growth, and 50 percent of the profits going forward. The Holeceks accepted the offer and the ownership of Tower Hobbies changed hands.

In 1985 Atkins combined Tower Hobbies with a Champaign-based RC product wholesale company named Great Planes Model Distributors. This new corporation was called Hobbico. With the additional resources, Tower Hobbies flourished.

Digital marketing was in its infancy when, in 1995, Tower Hobbies launched the towerhobbies.com web site for internet sales. The site was one of the first resources available for RC hobby customers interested in shopping online.

=== Acquisition by Horizon Hobby — 2018 ===
After Hobbico filed for bankruptcy in 2018, a majority of the assets including Tower Hobbies was acquired by Horizon Hobby.

== Product Brands Sold by Tower Hobbies ==
The following are some of the brands distributed by Tower Hobbies.

- ARRMA
- Associated Electrics
- Athearn
- Atlas
- Broadway Limited
- Castle Creations
- Celestron
- Diecast Masters
- Digitrax
- Dubro
- Duratrax
- Dynamite
- FMS
- Futaba
- Garrett Metal Detectors
- Gens ace
- Great Planes
- Hobbico
- HobbyZone
- Horizon Hobby
- Kadee
- Kyosho
- Lionel, LLC
- McHenry Couplers
- O.S. Engines
- Redcat Racing
- Reefs RC
- Saito
- Spektrum RC
- Tamiya
- Tekno RC
- Woodland Scenics
