= Japan Remote Control =

Japanese maker of R/C aircraft

Japan Remote Control Co., Ltd. (日本遠隔制御株式会社; Nippon Enkaku Seigyo Kabushiki Gaisha) (commonly called source Propo, source Racing, or hum) was a Japanese manufacturer of popular radio control devices including transmitters, receivers, servos, electronics, programmable robots and model aircraft. JR has ceased production of RC equipment.

== Overview ==
Unique to JR Propo's radios is the company's patented ABC&W technology, or Automatic Blocking Circuit with Window. Simply put, this system rapidly reroutes incoming signals through a series of ever-smaller electronic "windows," effectively blocking out spurious signals which cause radio "glitching". Any signal that does get through the system is filtered before being sent to the servos all without noticeable lag or delay. If the signal is unable to be processed, it is rejected, again without noticeable reaction.

Competing brands of radio control systems include, Spektrum RC, Sanwa, Futaba, Hitec, KO Propo, Jeti, Acoms and Multiplex Modelsport.
