= Multiplex Modellsport =

Dual-motored Multiplex TwinJET, a now-discontinued RC plane

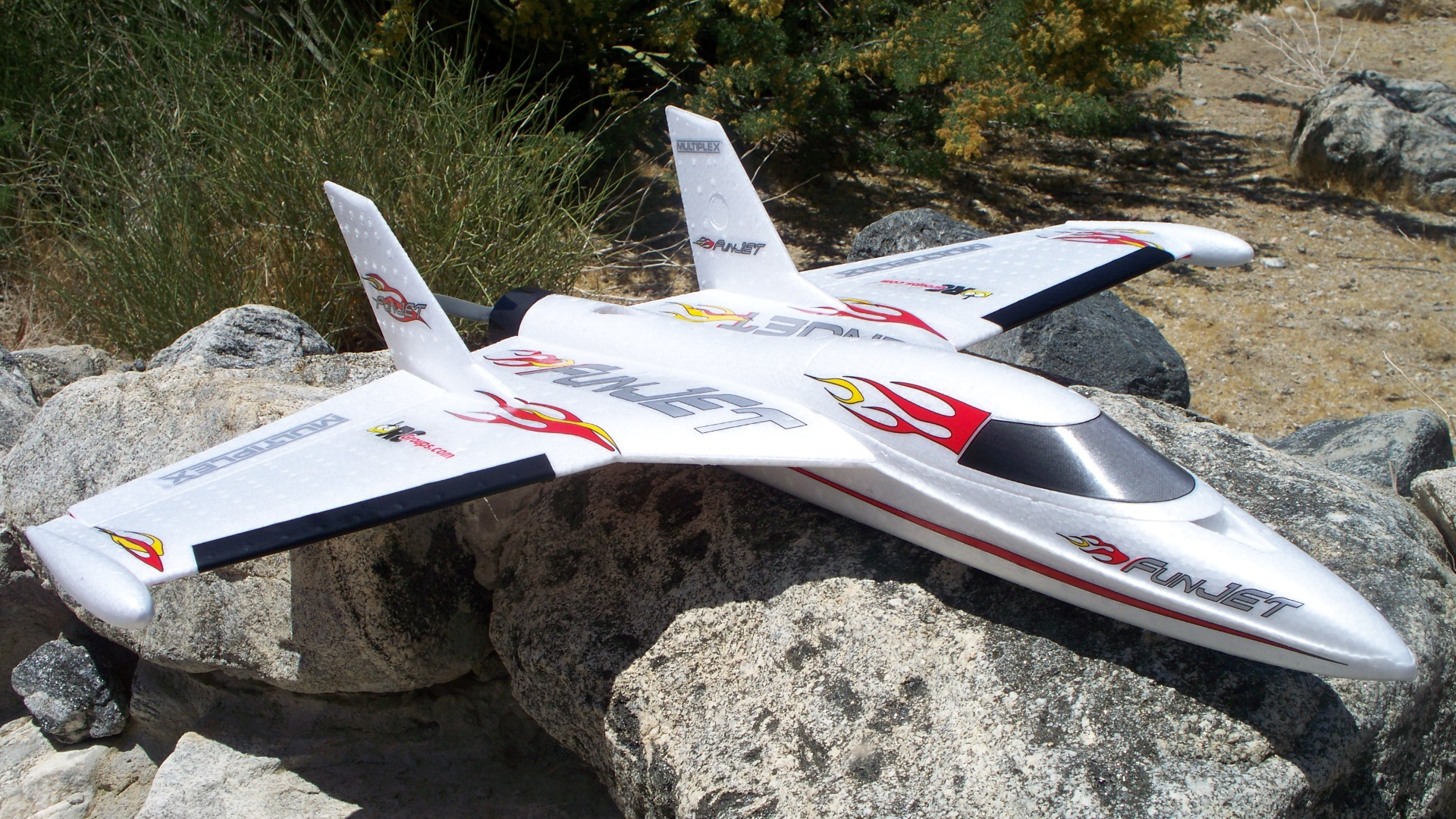
Single-motored Multiplex FunJET, the 2007 replacement for the TwinJET

Multiplex Modellsport GmbH & Co. KG of Bretten-Gölshausen, Germany is a manufacturer of hobby-grade RC planes and helicopters, along with accessories to go with them.

Their aircraft models are molded of a proprietary expanded polypropylene foam known as Elapor. The flexible nature of the material makes the company's models resistant to crash damage as well as easy assembly and repair with ordinary hobby-grade cyanoacrylate adhesives. The two-part epoxy commonly used in model assembly will not bind Elapor, nor will so-called "foam safe" cyanoacrylate adhesives used in the assembly and repair of EPS foam models.

== Products ==
=== Aircraft ===
Models range from small powered gliders such as the Cularis to "pusher prop jets" such as the FunJET pictured right, to electric "sportliners" such as the Blizzard, to the company's largest model, the Mentor. The Mentor (now discontinued), a trainer aircraft which resembles a Cessna 180, is an electric-powered model similar in size and power to a .40 cubic inch/6.5cc glow engine-powered model. It is large and powerful enough to be used as a glider tug and parts are packed with the kit to allow the Mentor to be used as such.

In 2010, the company introduced its first helicopter model, the Funcopter. The model features an Elapor fuselage and a direct drive rotor system, eliminating the need for the drive gears and one-way bearings found in many other models.

Also introduced in 2010 was the FunJET Ultra. The original FunJET is a popular subject for modification, with heavily modified examples capable of greater than 130 MPH (210 km/h). The Ultra addresses the problems inherent in such modifications with a combination of denser Elapor, improved aerodynamics with the elimination of the simulated wing tanks and an updated motor mount.

=== Radio control equipment ===
Multiplex's RoyalPRO line of aircraft and surface model radios are available in both North American and European frequency ranges including the spread spectrum 2.4 GHz band. The company also markets a line of servos and electronic speed controls, again for both air and surface use.

=== International competitors ===
Competing brands of radio control systems include, Spektrum RC, Sanwa, Futaba, Graupner, Hitec, Japan Remote Control, KO Propo, and Acoms.
