= Champaign Township, Champaign County, Illinois =

Champaign Township
- Township
- Location in Champaign County

- Champaign County's location in Illinois
- Coordinates: 40°05′36″N 88°18′28″W
- Country: United States
- State: Illinois
- County: Champaign
- Established: November 8, 1859

Area
  - Total: 18.64 sq mi (48.3 km^{2})
  - Land: 18.57 sq mi (48.1 km^{2})
  - Water: 0.07 sq mi (0.18 km^{2}) 0.38%
- Elevation: 715 ft (218 m)

Population (2020)
  - Total: 11,264
  - Density: 606.6/sq mi (234.2/km^{2})
- Time zone: UTC-6 (CST)
  - Summer (DST): UTC-5 (CDT)
- FIPS code: 17-019-12398
- Website: champaigntownship.com

Champaign Township is a township in Champaign County, Illinois, US. As of the 2020 census, its population was 11,264 and it contained 5,091 housing units.

== History ==
Champaign Township changed its name from West Urbana Township on April 30, 1860.

== Geography ==
Champaign is Township 19 North, Range 8 East of the Third Principal Meridian.

According to the 2010 census, the township has a total area of 18.64 square miles (48.3 km^{2}), of which 18.57 square miles (48.1 km^{2}) (or 99.62%) is land and 0.07 square miles (0.18 km^{2}) (or 0.38%) is water. The streams of Copper Slough and Phinney Branch run through this township.

Portions of the township have been removed through annexation with the City of Champaign.

=== Cities and towns ===
- Savoy (north three-quarters)

=== Unincorporated towns ===
- Staley

(This list is based on USGS data and may include former settlements

=== Cemeteries ===
Saint Marys and Prairie View Cemeteries are in Section 24.

=== Grain elevators ===
Champaign elevators were operated by C.A. Dickey, Champaign Cereal Mills and Elevator in 1913; also Dryer and Burt Grain and Coal in 1913.

Savoy elevator (Section 36) was built along the Illinois Central—Canadian National railroad. Savoy Grain and Coal Company operated a wooden elevator, no longer standing, in 1913. Concrete silos of the present elevator are east of U.S. Route 45 but the elevator is no longer operating.

Staley's Station elevator (Section 16) was built along the Illinois Central—Canadian National east–west line. It was operating in 1913, but both the station and elevator are gone.

West Urbana Depot, later Champaign (Section 12). Mark Carley built a steam flouring mill, steam grain elevator and warehouse near the Illinois Central—Canadian National railroad in the mid–1850s.

=== Public transit ===
- Champaign–Urbana Mass Transit District

=== Major highways ===
- Interstate 57
- Interstate 72
- Interstate 74
- U.S. Route 45
- U.S. Route 150
- Illinois State Route 10

=== Airports and landing strips ===
- University of Illinois Heliport

== Demographics ==
As of the 2020 census there were 11,264 people, 4,956 households, and 2,782 families residing in the township. The population density was 623.42 inhabitants per square mile (240.70/km^{2}). There were 5,091 housing units at an average density of 281.77 per square mile (108.79/km^{2}). The racial makeup of the township was 69.72% White, 7.60% African American, 0.14% Native American, 14.49% Asian, 0.01% Pacific Islander, 1.21% from other races, and 6.84% from two or more races. Hispanic or Latino of any race were 4.00% of the population.

There were 4,956 households, out of which 26.50% had children under the age of 18 living with them, 50.28% were married couples living together, 4.30% had a female householder with no spouse present, and 43.87% were non-families. 34.20% of all households were made up of individuals, and 16.50% had someone living alone who was 65 years of age or older. The average household size was 2.29 and the average family size was 2.98.

The township's age distribution consisted of 20.5% under the age of 18, 6.5% from 18 to 24, 25.3% from 25 to 44, 23.3% from 45 to 64, and 24.4% who were 65 years of age or older. The median age was 43.0 years. For every 100 females, there were 83.6 males. For every 100 females age 18 and over, there were 83.7 males.

The median income for a household in the township was $80,313, and the median income for a family was $120,417. Males had a median income of $59,375 versus $46,437 for females. The per capita income for the township was $45,675. About 3.5% of families and 8.5% of the population were below the poverty line, including 7.3% of those under age 18 and 8.4% of those age 65 or over.

Historical population
Census	Pop.	Note	%±
2000	11,591		—
2010	10,834		−6.5%
2020	11,264		4.0%
U.S. Decennial Census

== Economy ==
In addition to the University of Illinois, Champaign Township is also home to a Kraft Foods plant (and adjacent AC Humko plant). The township's major employers include The University of Illinois, Champaign Unit #4 School District, and Kraft Foods. Numerous township residents are also employed by Parkland College, Kirby Foods, Christie Clinic, Devonshire Group LLC, Amdocs, Hobbico and Horizon Hobby, all of which are in the adjacent city of Champaign, Illinois, as well as by Carle Clinic Association and Provena Health, located in nearby Urbana, Illinois.
