= JRC =

JRC is a three-letter abbreviation with multiple meanings, as described below:

- The hepatitis B and liver cancer awareness campaign Jade Ribbon Campaign
- The media corporation Journal Register Company
- Johnson Reprint Corporation, a reprint publisher by Walter J. Johnson a.k.a. Walter Jolowicz
- The Joint Radio Company of the fuel and power industries in the United Kingdom.
- The European Commission Joint Research Centre (JRC)
- Japanese Red Cross
- Radio communication equipment manufacturer Japan Radio Co., Ltd.
- Radio control devices manufacturer Japan Remote Control
- Jose Rizal College, now Jose Rizal University of Mandaluyong, Philippines
- The Judge Rotenberg Educational Center
- Royal Court of Jersey
- Junior Rally Championship, formerly known as Junior World Rally Championship prior to 2007
