= Hobbico =

Hobby products manufacturer

Hobbico, Inc. was a manufacturer and distributor of hobby products including radio control airplanes, boats, cars, helicopters and multirotors/drones. Other products include plastic model kits, model rockets, model trains, slot cars, crafts, jigsaw puzzles and games. The company had approximately 850 employees worldwide. On January 10, 2018, Hobbico filed for Chapter 11 bankruptcy protection and announced the company is for sale. On April 13, Horizon Hobby acquired control of most Hobbico RC brands & IP (excepting Great Planes Manufacturing). Estes Industries acquired the Estes-Cox business unit and a German venture capital group acquired Revell Germany whole and the Revell-Monogram brands, IP & molds.

Its headquarters is located in Champaign, Illinois.

The company distributed over 150 brands of hobby products including about 30 proprietary product brands. Proprietary brands include: Axial, ARRMA, Dromida, Team Durango, dBoots, Revell, Monogram, Top Flite, Great Planes, AquaCraft Models, FlightPower, Heli-Max, SuperTigre, O'Donnell Fuel, Duratrax, RealFlight, MonoKote, Carl Goldberg Products, ElectriFly, Coverite, Dynaflite, Flyzone, MuchMore Racing, LiFeSource, Tactic, VS Tank, Estes Industries, Proto-X, TrakPower and others. It was the exclusive distributor for Futaba radio control products in North and South America, for O.S. Engines in North America and HPI Racing, Italeri, Novak Electronics and Nine Eagles in North and South America.

== Company history ==
- In 1971 Tower Hobbies was founded by Bruce Holecek.
- In 1972 Great Planes Model Distributors was founded by Don Anderson.
- Hobbico was started in 1985 when Tower Hobbies was combined with Great Planes Model Distributors to form Hobbico, Inc.
- In November 2005 the company became a 100% employee-owned ESOP (Employee Stock Ownership Plan).
- In May 2007 Hobbico acquired Revell-Monogram, famous maker of Revell plastic model kits.
- In January 2010 Hobbico acquired model rocket maker Estes Industries.
- In September 2010 Hobbico was appointed exclusive distributor for Thunder Tiger in North and South America.
- In January 2012 Hobbico acquired the brands Axial, Durango, Arrma and dBoots tires.
- As of January 2015 Hobbico no longer distributes Thunder Tiger products.
- In 2012, Hobbico acquired Revell Germany located in Bunde, Germany, and launched Hobbico Europe.
- On January 10, 2018, it was announced that Hobbico had filed for Chapter 11 bankruptcy protection.
- On 30 June 2018, it was announced that Hobbico had filed for Chapter 7 bankruptcy and went into liquidation.
