= The Red Baron (custom car) =

Custom car created in 1969

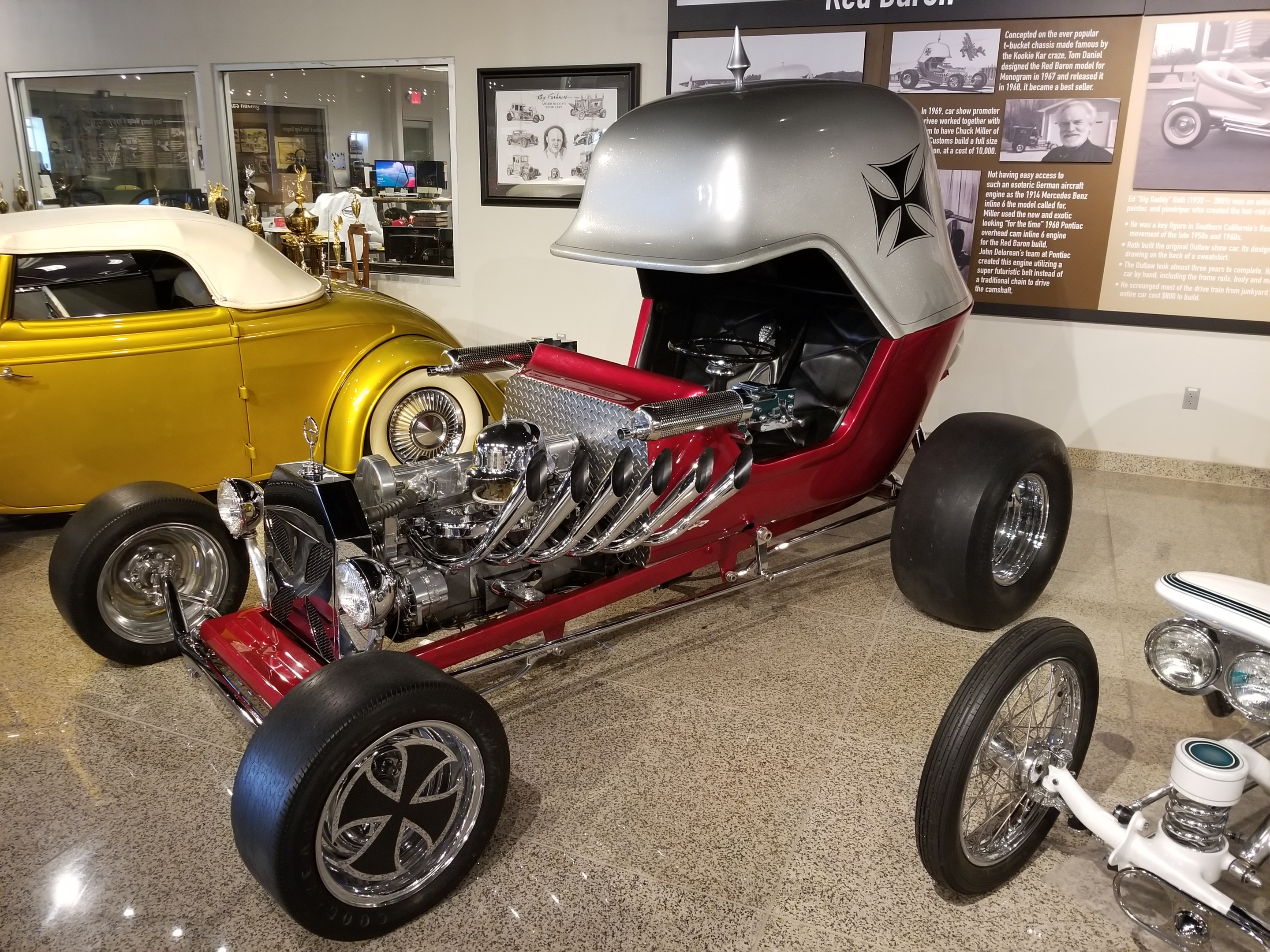
The Red Baron custom car

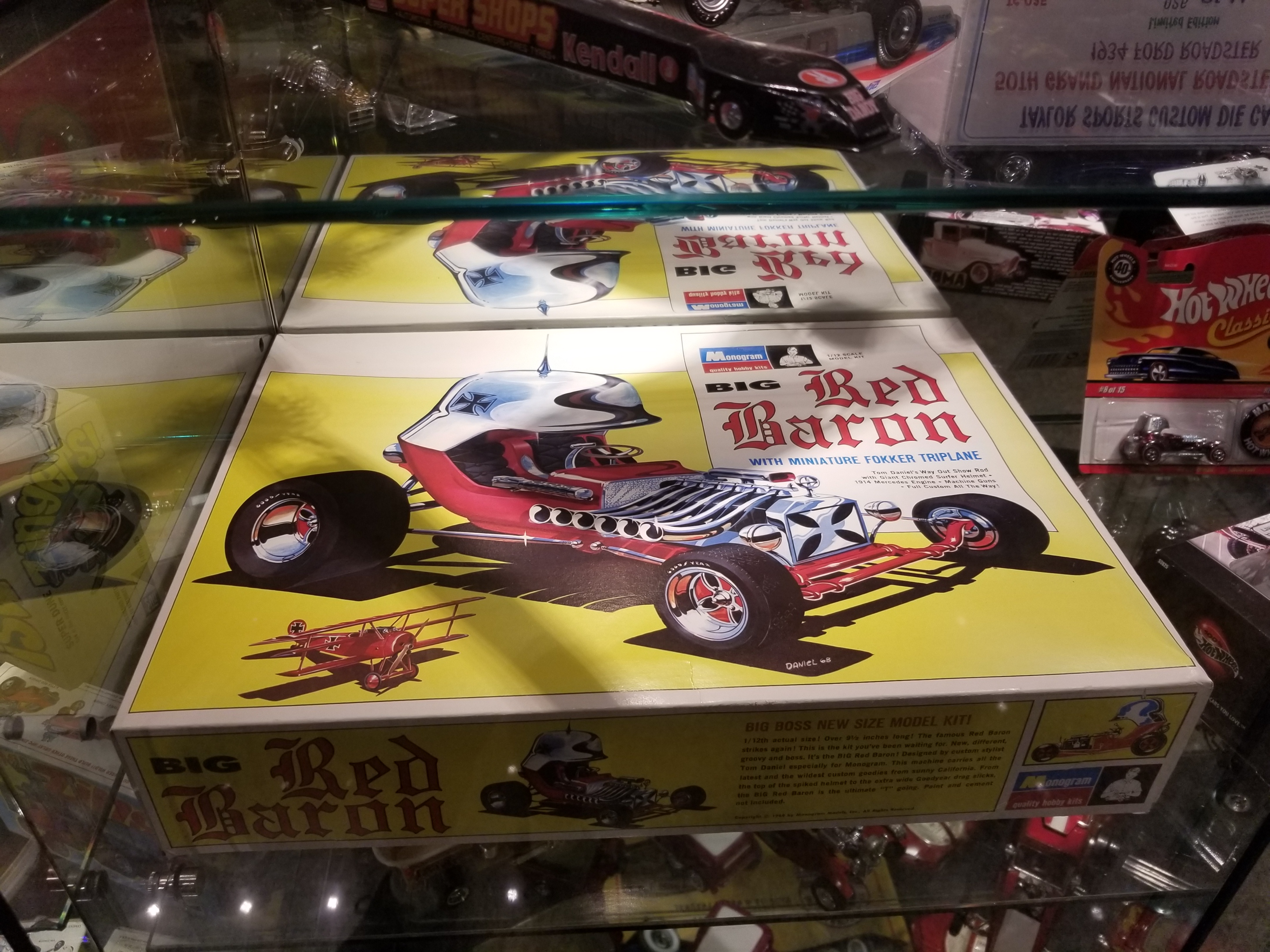
The model kit that inspired the Red Baron custom car

The Red Baron is a custom t-bucket hot rod designed by Tom Daniel and built in 1969 by Chuck Miller of Styline Customs.

== Design ==
The project was designed by model designer Tom Daniel in 1967 for the Monogram Company, inspired the trend of west coast surfers wearing German WW-I helmets.

After being displayed at the 1967 Chicago Toy Fair the popular model kit hit the shelves in 1968 selling over two million units. With its rise in popularity the Monogram Company arranged to have a full-size version of the car built. Bob Larivee worked with the Monogram Company to have the car built by Styline Customs. While the original model featured a 1914 Mercedes-Benz inline 6-cylinder engine, the full-size car received an OHC Pontiac 6-cylinder. The car features intricate details such as dual mounted machine guns and iron cross wheels. The Red Baron can be seen on display at the Smith Collection Museum of American Speed in Lincoln, Nebraska.

== Scale models ==
A model kit of the Red Baron was released in 1968, selling over two million units. The Red Baron later inspired a Hot Wheels car.
