= Revell =

Scale model manufacturer

Revell GmbH
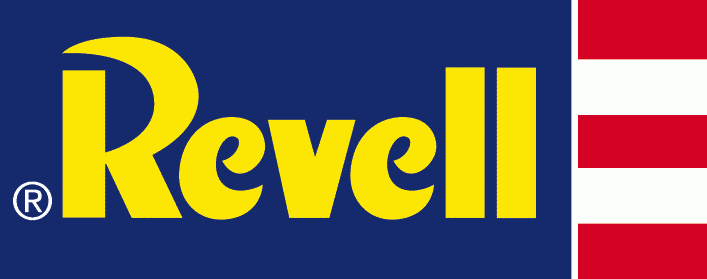

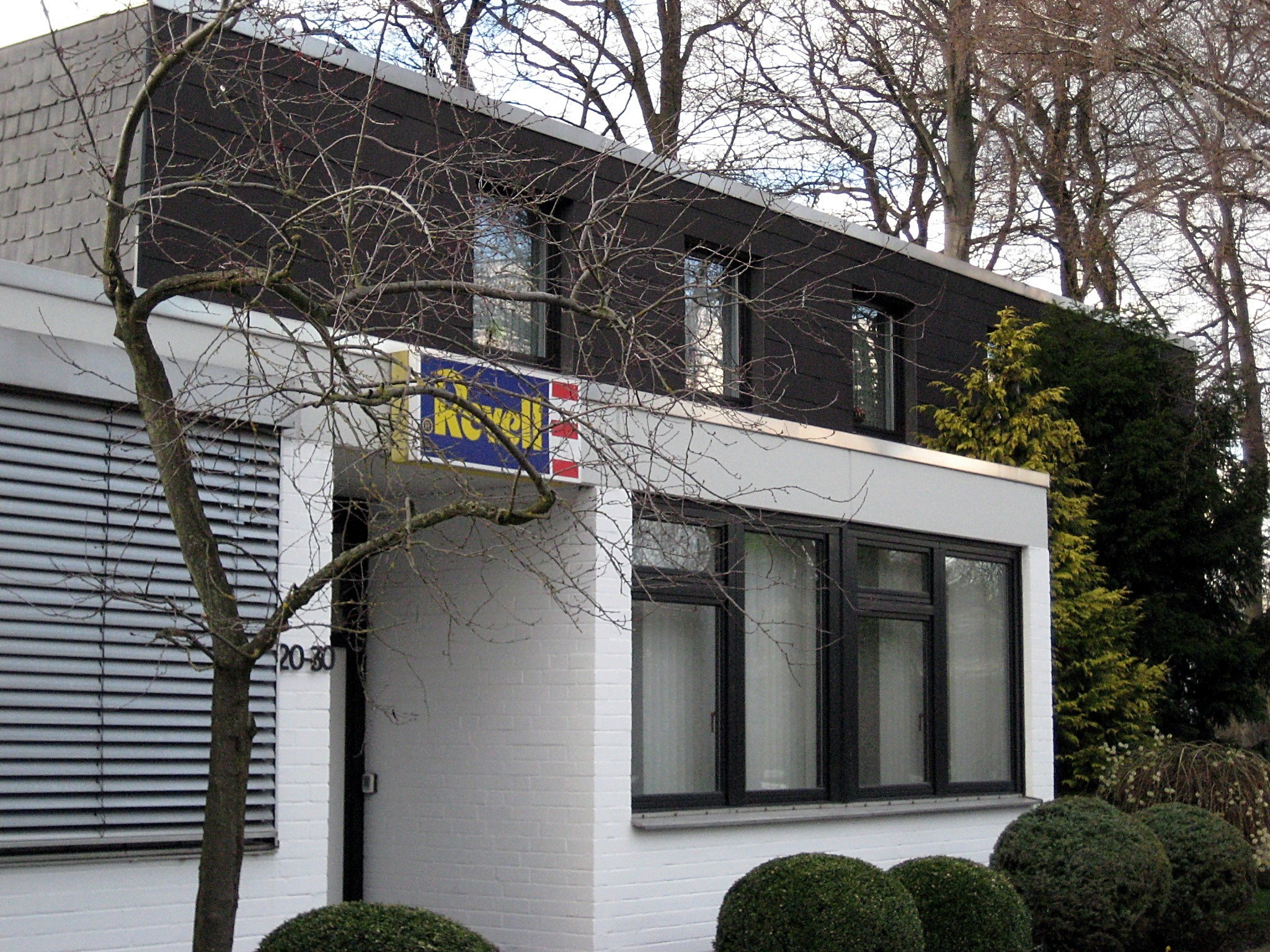
- Revell corporate headquarters in Bünde
- Formerly: Revell-Monogram (1986–2007)
- Type: GmbH
- Founded: 1943; 83 years ago in Hollywood
- Founder: Lewis H. Glaser
- Fate: Merged with Monogram in 1986, merger then dissolved and acquired by other companies
- Headquarters: Bünde, Germany
- Products: Plastic scale models cars, aircraft, ships, commercial vehicles
- Brands: Revell Control
- Parent: Quantum Capital Partners (2018–pres.); Hobbico (2007–18); Hallmark Cards (1994–2007)
- Subsidiaries: Revell Plastics GmbH (1956–2006)
- Website: revell.com

Revell GmbH is an American-origin manufacturer of plastic scale models, currently based in Bünde, Germany. The original Revell company merged with Monogram in 1986, becoming "Revell-Monogram". The business operated until 2007, when American Revell was purchased by Hobbico, while the German subsidiary "Revell Plastics GmbH" (established in 1956) had separated from the American firm in 2006 until Hobbico purchased it in 2012, bringing the two back together again under the same company umbrella. After the Hobbico demise in 2018, Quantum Capital Partners (QCP) acquired Revell.

Some of the scale products manufactured and commercialized by Revell are cars, aircraft, ships, and commercial vehicles.

== History ==
=== Early history ===
Lewis H. Glaser, a California entrepreneur, founded a plastics molding firm called "Precision Specialties" in Hollywood in 1943. (Note: Due to conflicting claims published by Revell US and Revell of Germany, the date of Revell's founding is disputed. According to the official Revell of Germany website, Revell was founded in 1943. While Revell US itself claims that it was founded in 1945. The confusion is probably due to the earlier establishment of the firm Precision Specialties and exactly when the name changed over to Revell. Both Revell US and Revell of Germany existed together until Revell of Germany became independent in 2006. Hobbico acquired Revell US in 2007 and it also acquired Revell of Germany in 2012, reuniting the brand under Hobbico.) The company made a variety of products contracted for different companies, the first reportedly being a small washing machine. One of the first toy-related products were HO scale (1:87) train sets, including locomotives, and a variety of cars along with buildings. The building line was extensive, including a farm group, a suburban passenger station, and a variety of utility structures. Many of these originals were reproduced later in other scales. The toy line was marketed later under the brand name Revell. Reportedly, the name Revell came from the French word réveil meaning "new beginning".

==== Gowland and Highway Pioneers ====
About 1950, Revell reproduced Maxwell and Ford Model T assembled toys originally designed by the Gowland Brothers in England, a company producing toys since 1932. According to noted collector Cecil Gibson, these did not sell well in England, but Revell had much better luck with the series in the U.S. The Revell box said, "By John Gowland—creator of Champ and Chu Chu". The 1911 Maxwell and 1910 Model T were about 1:16 scale and called "Action Pull Toys", which consisted of a wound thin metal cord with a plastic handle. The cord was attached through the front of the car to the rear axle. The car's body was hinged, so when the plastic handle was pulled, the car bounced on the floor – with the driver bobbing up and down. The box advertised that these were "Made in Hollywood" and were called Revell "Play Planned" toys.

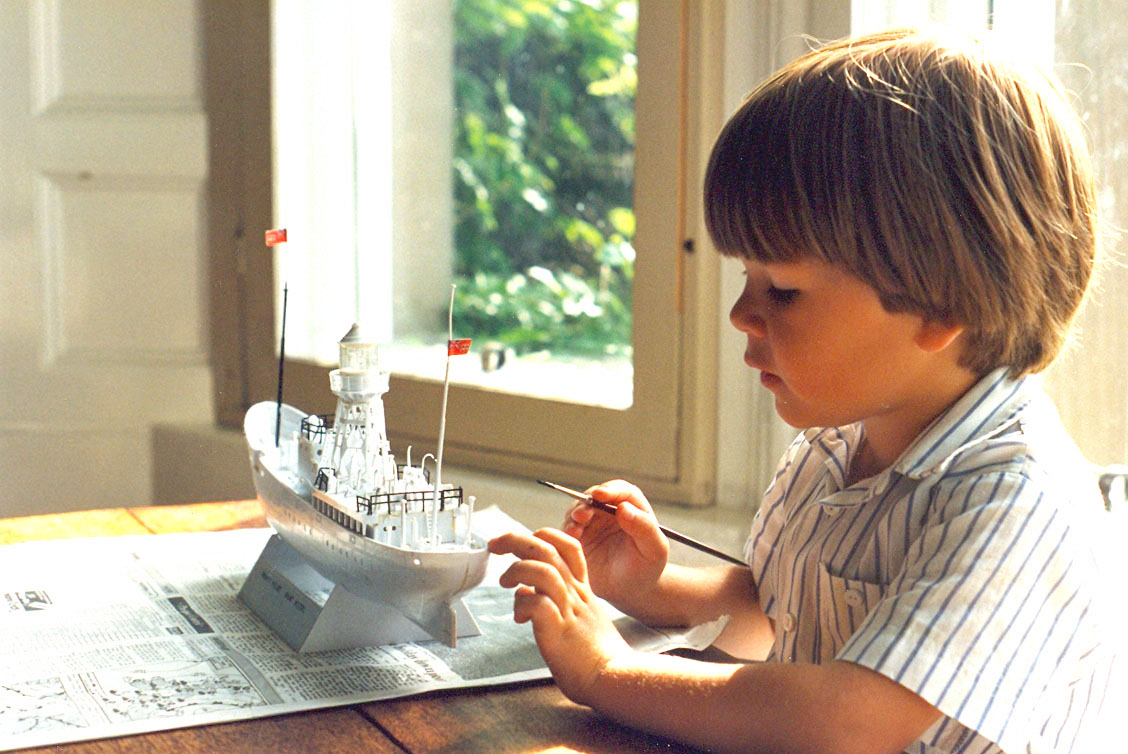
A young boy paints a Revell model of the South Goodwin Lightship.

A couple of years later, these toys were scaled down and modeled as 3/8" to a foot scale (four to five inches) and called "Highway Pioneers Quick Construction" kits—most without the rather cartoonish figures and without the mechanical "action". These new 1:32 toys met with great success and sold much better than the larger Maxwell, even though it was made famous by Jack Benny's radio show, circa 1943. The original larger cars were discontinued and Revell focused on the newer kits, with the Gowland hot air balloon logo still shown on the green, yellow, orange or blue boxes. Box information shows models were offered in at least four series, not including the Maxwell and four other Highway Pioneers released in UK (from the Hudson Miniature molds). Series one consisted of a 1900 Packard, 1903 Ford Model A, 1910 Ford Model T roadster, 1909 Stanley Steamer, and a 1903 Cadillac. Series two was 1914 Stutz Bearcat, 1915 Ford Model T Sedan, 1908 Buick Rumble, 1910 Studebaker, and a 1910 Cadillac (later the Olds delivery was substituted). Series three was the 1904 Oldsmobile (later the 1910 Cadillac was substituted), 1904 Rambler, 1907 Sears, 1910 Pierce Arrow, and a 1911 Rolls-Royce. Series Four included a 1915 Fiat, 1907 Renault, an MGTD, Jaguar 120 and 4,1 L Ferrari. Revell also offered gift sets of the five car series, and a "Collector's Kit" set with ten individually wrapped kits of the Highway Pioneer models in one box.

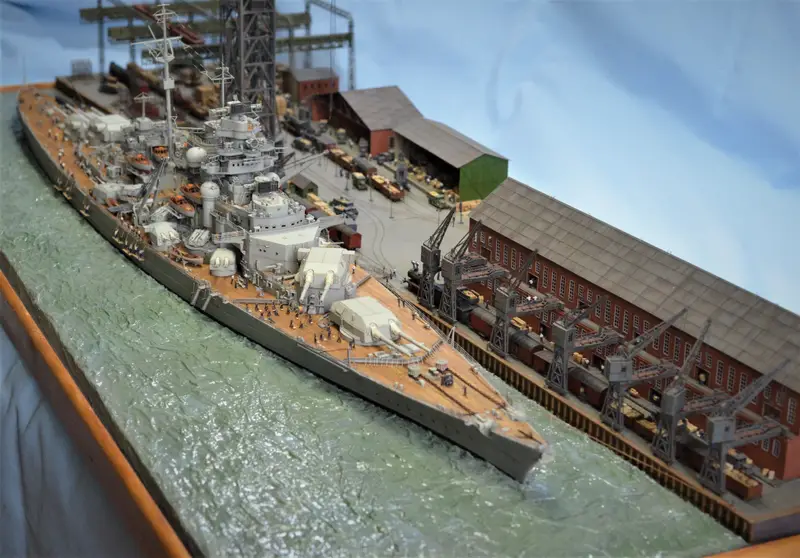
Diorama based on Bismarck Battleship scale kit from Revell

Models in the "Highway Pioneers" series were commonly retooled and later offered by a number of other companies including Premier, Lincoln International, J & L Randall Ltd ("Merit" brand), Lodela (licensed in Mexico) Crush, and Minicraft. Eventually the original Highway Pioneers tools were acquired by British model train manufacturer Dapol Ltd. The models are currently out of production and reportedly the tooling is located in Wales, headquarters of Dapol, along with redundant tools from Airfix, Kitmaster and Tri-ang Model Land. Some of these copies and knock-offs appeared very early and at the same time Revell was making them.

Revell acquire five non-Gowland designs, like the 1911 Maxwell offered by Hudson Miniatures of Scranton, Pennsylvania, appeared in 1952 under the "Lil' Old Timers" name. The Hudson Miniatures kits usually were manufactured with a small brochure giving historical facts on each vehicle. One preserved example sold around 1953 in Strouss-Hirshbergs for 69 cents; the box advertised the model as a "Quickie-Kit". Revell, GB added these to the Highway Pioneer offerings in similar packaging to other US offering at that time. These five were later marketed by Heller as Cadet series and eventually were adapted with new tires in Germany. Ultimately two of the five and Gowland Rolls-Royce were marketed by SMER.

==== Other 1950s offerings ====
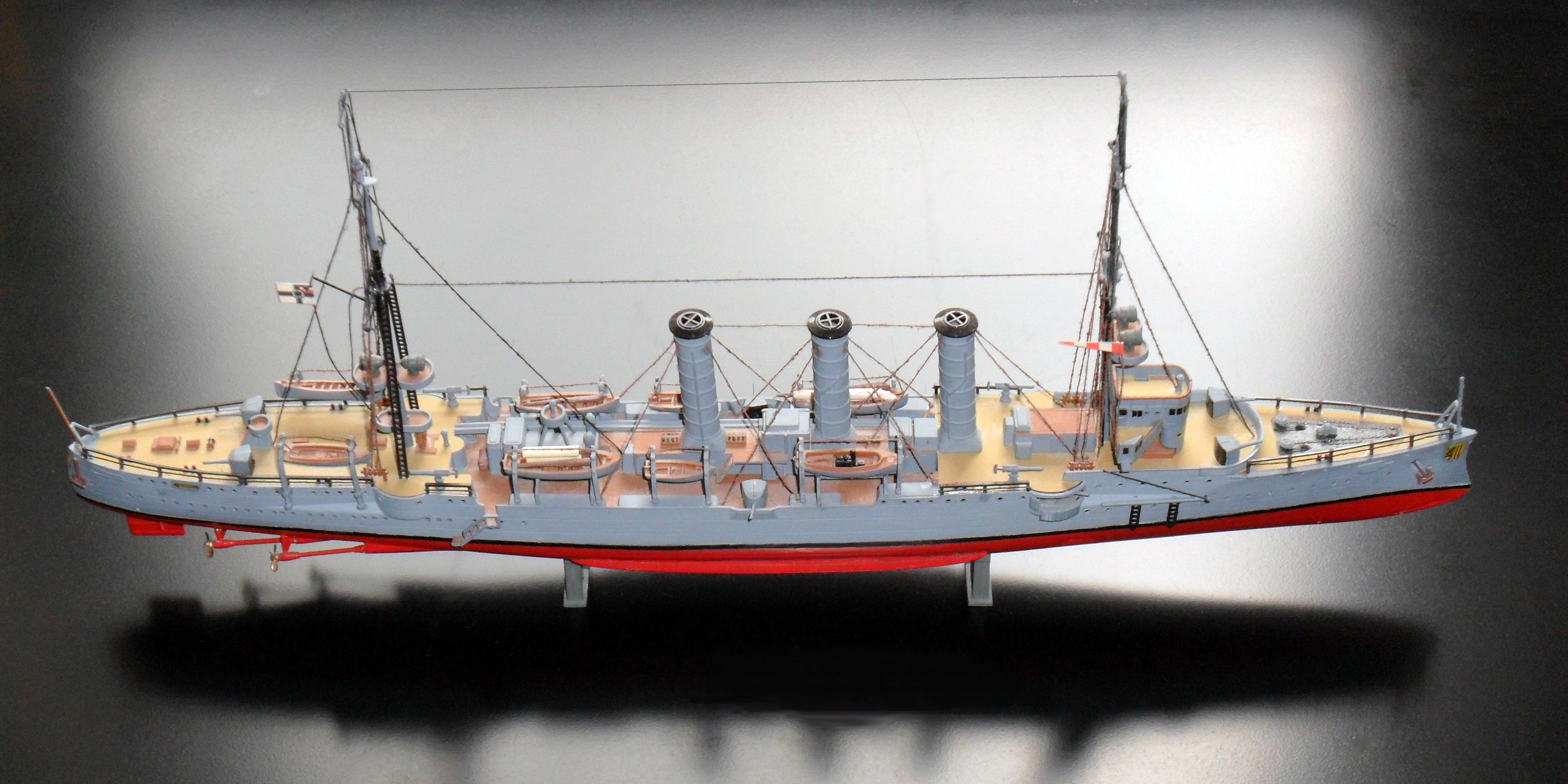
A Revell built model of the SMS Dresden from 1907

Several jet and propeller airplane models followed along with ships (classic and contemporary), jet engines, and in the late 1950s, rockets and spacecraft. This included models of Redstone and other military test missiles and Vanguard, Jupiter and Atlas rockets. Other issues, like the Helios "Nuclear"-powered ship, "Moon Ship", a "Passenger Rocket", a "Space Taxi", and a not-so-incredible "Space Shuttle" were kits more in the science-fiction realm. One site describes the one-time 1959 issue of an envisioned space station as the "Holy Grail" of Revell kits. Infantry figures and various dioramas, especially for railroad setups, were also produced.

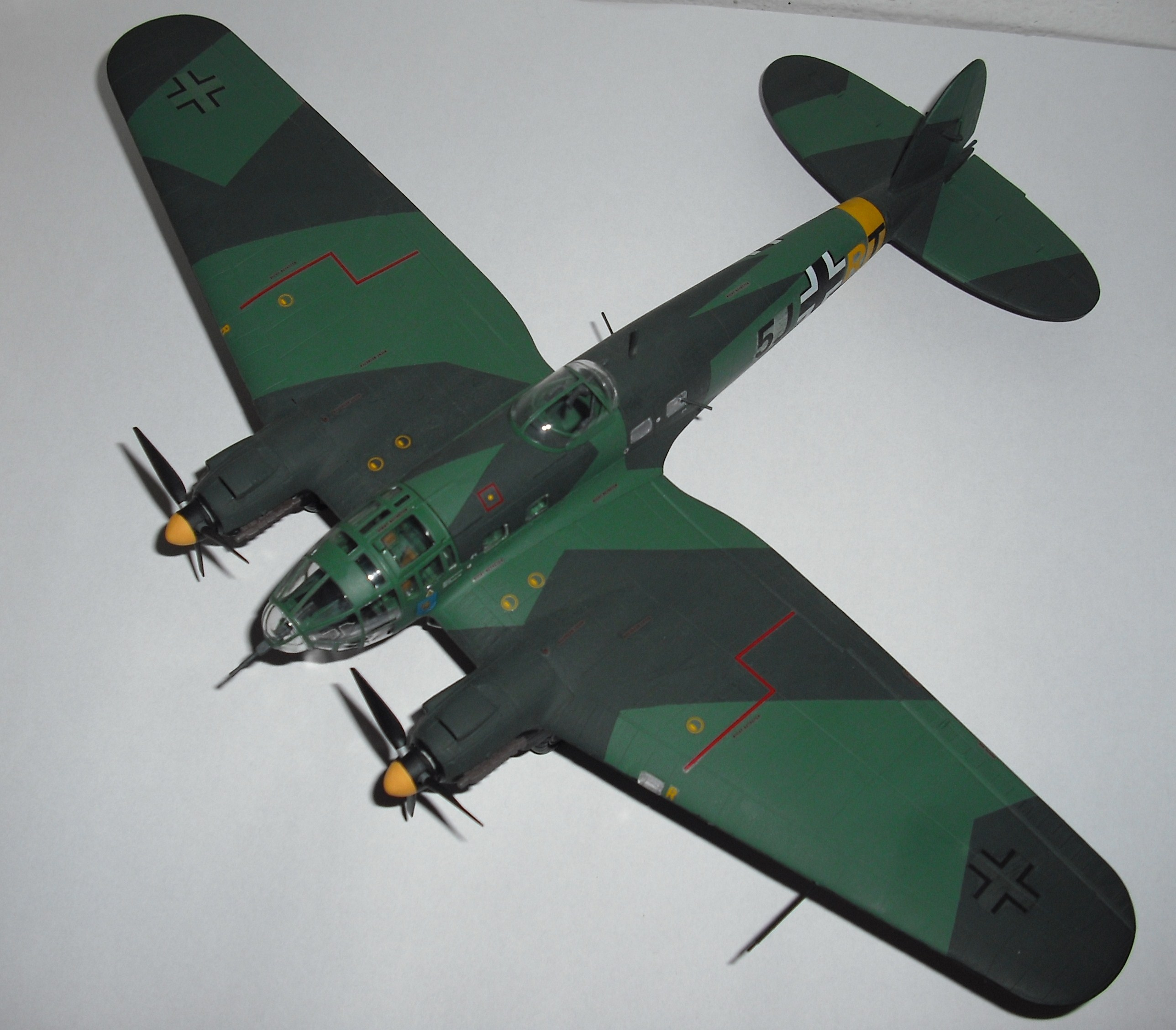
A 1:72 scale Revell Heinkel He 111

In the later 1950s, Revell began making more automotive-related models. Beside jet engines, car engine models like the Chrysler Slant-Six were produced. Car models tended toward a more global selection than AMT or MPC or other American plastic model makers, with many European brands produced, including many British makes. One interesting offering came about with a collaboration with AMT making the 1955 and 1956 promotional Buick. The models were atypical for the time in that there was full chassis detail, and bodies were cast in several pieces. Revell made these specifically ready-built for showroom display. Another kit related to pop culture was the 1956 Lincoln Futura concept car – a vehicle that, with out-of-this-world bubble windows, would eventually become George Barris's Batmobile.

==== The Kustom 1960s ====
Starting in the late 1950s, model kits began to veer away strongly from stock presentations and focus on customizing, hot rodding, and racing. The 1960s solidified this direction with almost infinite variations in how a kit could be built. This trend showed both the extensive new marketing reach of the hobby as well as the pervasive individuality portrayed in American car customizing.

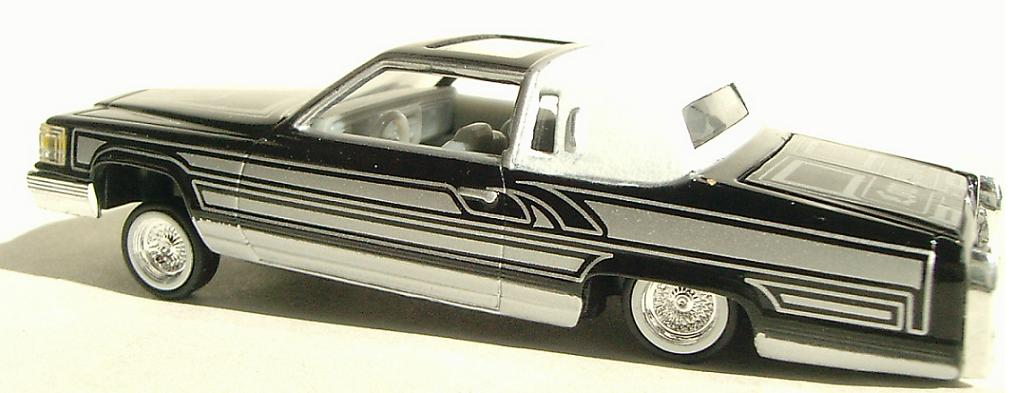
A built Cadillac low-rider

Model companies hired big name customizers to create new and striking designs. Just as AMT had hired George Barris and Darryl Starbird, Revell hired Ed "Big Daddy" Roth about 1962 as their new stylist. Hawk Models would use Bill Campbell's "'Weird-Ohs" like "Davey" the wild motor-bike rider and "Digger" the dragster, and later, Monogram would hire designer Tom Daniel. At this time, Roth created the bubble-glassed "Beatnik Bandit" (later made even more famous when produced by Hot Wheels), the double engined "Mysterion", the asymmetrical "Orbitron", the "Outlaw" (a highly styled T bucket), and the "Road Agent". Apart from wheeled wonders, arguably his most famous creation was the "Rat Fink", an anti-Mickey Mouse figure. Roth's Web site reports that in 1963 Revell paid Roth 1 cent for every one of his model kits sold, totaling $32,000.

In the early-to-mid-1960s, slot car racing became a fad, and like many other companies, Revell attempted to enter the fray by using its plastic model car bodies with mechanicals underneath—fit for the track. In 1965 Revell acquired International Raceways, planning high grade race tracks that could fill whole rooms. Soon thereafter, the company opened a "Revell Raceway" commercial slot car racing facility at 6840 La Tijera Boulevard, Los Angeles, California, actively demonstrating six track configurations that commercial slot car racing businesses could order for fabrication by Revell, with prices ranging from $2,500 to $8,000. "One of the largest commercial model car raceways in the United States, being approximately 17,000 square feet, it features all the plush appointments and six tracks, the largest being 220 running feet with banked turns up to 60 degrees." It may have been too much too late: the competition was too keen and the slot car hobby was already starting to wane in influence. Slot car kings like Chicago's Strombecker would eventually be purchased by Tootsietoy and end up making simple plastic cars and other toys. By 1967, Revell's experiment in the hobby had racked up a nearly half-million dollar loss

==== Money troubles and Monogram merger ====
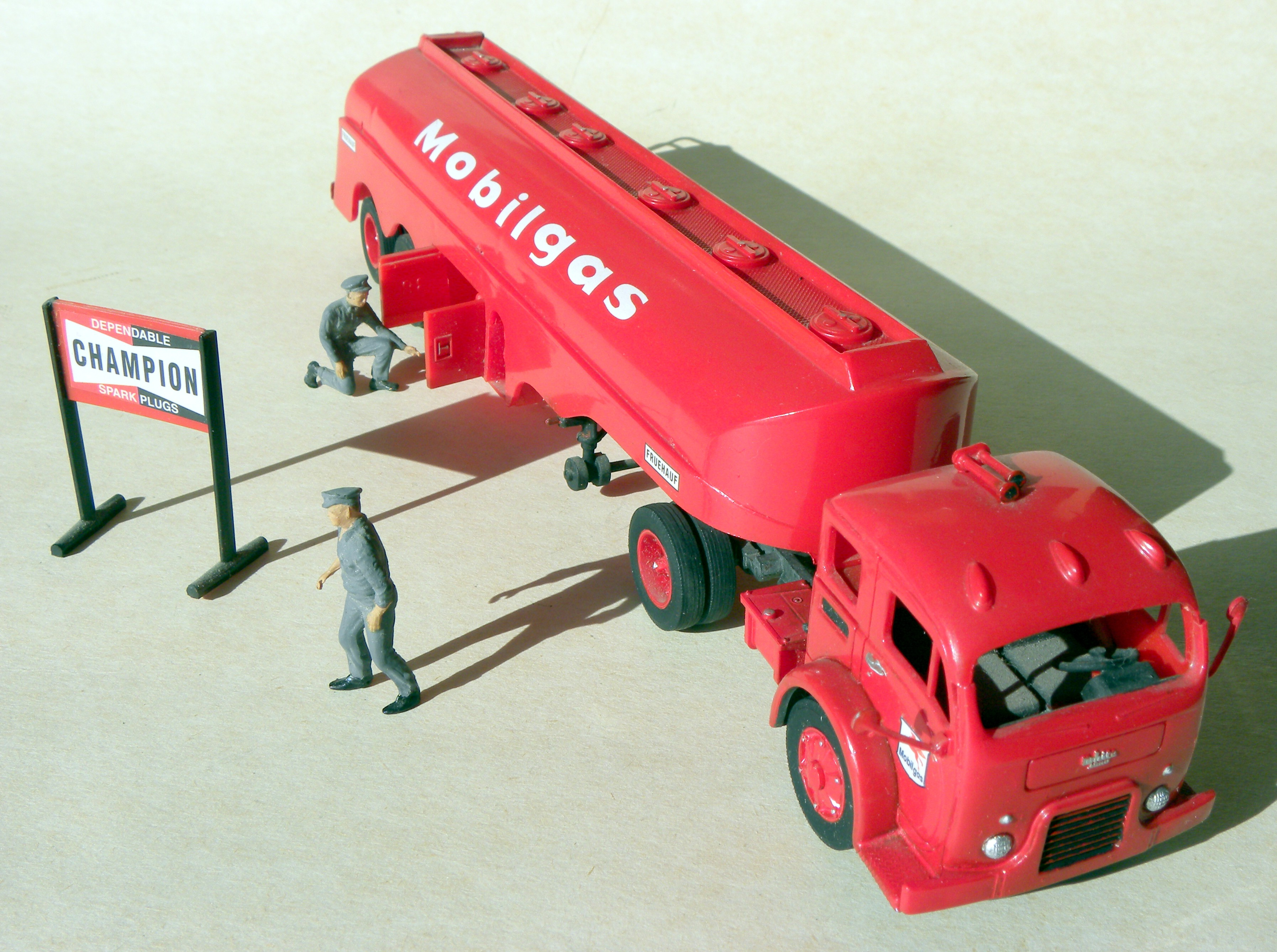
White-Fruehauf Mobilgas Tanker; original molds issued in the late 1950s, reissued in 1995

About 1980, as the modeling hobby was weakening in America and sales of plastic kits plummeted, Revell was purchased by French toy company, Generale du Jouet (also known as CEJI), which hoped to take advantage of Revell's European division and presence. Still, Generale du Jouet was having financial troubles of its own, and by 1983 Revell was again spun off.

In 1986, after declining profitability in a new era of video games and cable television, Revell was purchased by Odyssey Partners of New York and folded into Monogram Models of Morton Grove, Illinois, which Odyssey had purchased earlier that year. Its plant in Venice was closed and all its usable assets were transferred to Monogram's Number 2 plant in Des Plaines, Illinois. The new company then moved to Northbrook, Illinois. Due to the worldwide name recognition, Revell has become the primary brand name used on many of its kit lines, and after years of seeing both names on the logo, the Monogram name is now again portrayed separately. The company was then headquartered in Elk Grove Village, Illinois, United States.

Its major American competitors in the plastic model kit market include AMT-Ertl, Lindberg, and Testor.

==== Revell in Germany ====
In 1956, the German subsidiary, "Revell Plastics GmbH", was founded in Bünde, West Germany. During the 1970s, this company started developing and manufacturing its own lines of model kits independently and outside the direct control of Revell, USA. These models were imported into the United States, and some of the newer kits earned a reputation for high quality. However, the "German" kits are now produced only in Eastern Europe or China under the German Revell label. Once known as Revell AG, the German company has now changed to the legal form of GmbH & Co. KG. Revell Germany became independent after its formal separation from Revell-Monogram LLC in September 2006, but was purchased by Hobbico early in 2012, bringing both Revells back into the same company once again. While separate, the German products continued to be advertised on the American company web site, and its logo was almost identical to that of Revell in the United States. When it comes to total revenue, the German company ranked somewhat above the former American parent company.

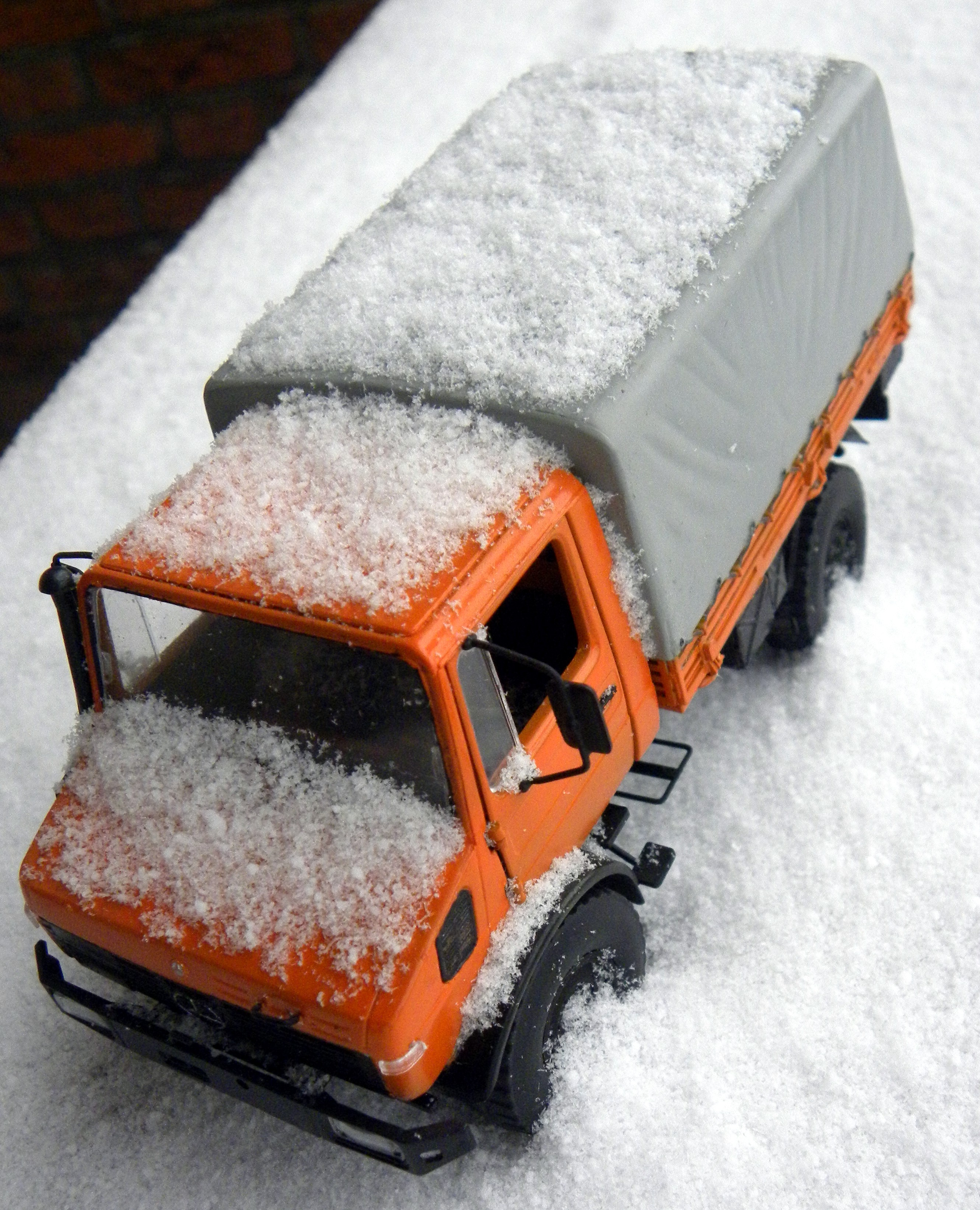
Revell Europe Mercedes-Benz Unimog

Besides an array of airplane and military kits, Revell Germany has also made a variety of 1:24 and 1:18 scale accurately rendered pre-assembled die-cast model cars. These were first produced in the late 1980s and were typical Porsche, Ferrari, BMW and Mercedes-Benz offerings with some Corvettes and a 1965 Mustang. Starting around 2000, the company simplified its diecast line calling it simply, "Revell Metal", as opposed to plastic seen in the kits. These later models have mostly been earlier German vehicles, with a focus on micro-cars. Examples are the Lloyd Alexander, Messerschmitt Kabinroller KR 200, BMW Isetta, and a very authentic looking DKW Junior.

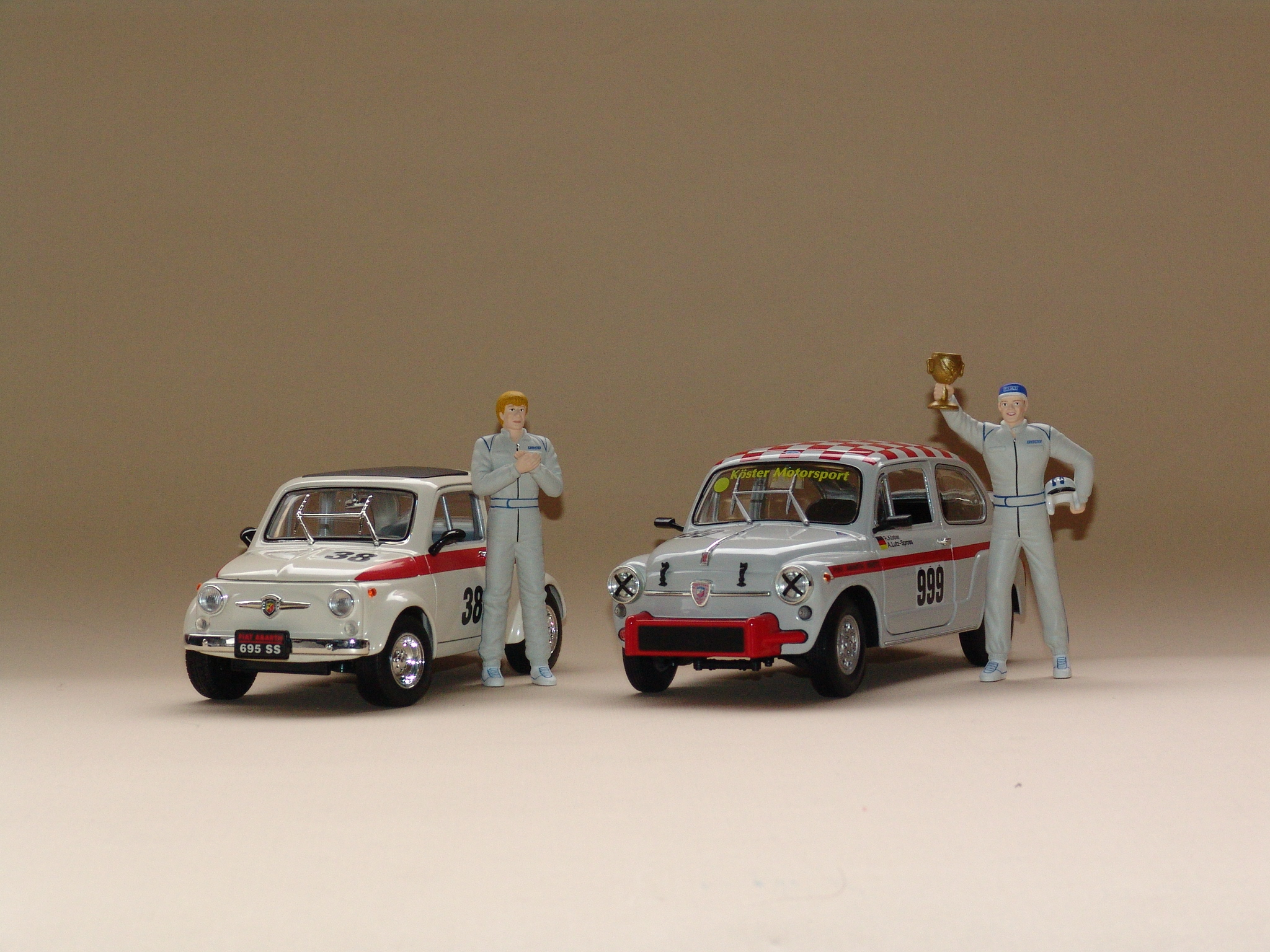
Revell Europe 1:18 scale metal Fiat 500 and Fiat 600 Rally

Some models, like the Goggomobil T250 and the BMW Isetta came in a couple of trim versions. The Goggomobil appeared in a closed roof, austerely basic model as well as an open "cloth" roofed fancy decor version with whitewall tyres and chrome grille, which was probably not the popular model with less affluent German consumers of the real car just following World War II. The Isetta is appealing in miniature with opening front access door and 'tilt-away' steering wheel. The model also features a removable side panel next to the location of the tiny engine. The BMW was available in several colors – with and without rear luggage rack and also in a special yellow 'Bundespost' (German Mail) version.

Some of the larger vehicles featured have been the mid-1950s Mercedes-Benz 180 "ponton" sedan and a variety of European Fords, mainly from the 1960s. The postwar decade cars' interiors are consistently authentically decorated in period grey and white colours typical of the austerity of the times. A couple of more modern diecast models have been a VW Scirocco, BMW 850i coupe and an Acura NSX. Generally, German Revell diecast models all have opening doors, hoods and trunks.

=== Recent history ===
In 1994, Revell-Monogram was purchased by Hallmark Cards as part of its Binney and Smith division (the owners of famous Crayola crayons). In September 2001, Binney & Smith completed the sale of Revell-Monogram off to Alpha International. Alpha International is a Cedar Rapids, Iowa based company that specialized in diecast and collectible products. Just a short year later, Alpha sells Revell-Monogram off to Gearbox Toys also of Cedar Rapids.. On May 2, 2007, Hobbico, Inc. announced it had acquired American Revell-Monogram, LLC, corporate owner of the Revell name. The Revell name now stands alone in the company logo, without the Monogram name also present, though Monogram still exists as an important line of models in the Revell catalogue. Hobbico also acquired Revell of Germany in 2012, reuniting the two brands under one banner, but often models sold in the U.S. show Revell Germany as the parent with Hobbico nowhere labeled.

On January 10, 2018, Hobbico, Inc. filed for bankruptcy protection.

On April 13, 2018, Revell USA temporarily ceased operations while they reorganized. On April 17, 2018, it was announced that international investment group Quantum Capital Partners (QCP) would be taking over operations of Revell. Their US-based tooling was sold to Atlantis Models, based in New York. Currently, Revell USA operates in conjunction with Carrera under the joint name "Carrera-Revell". The company operates out of New Jersey and is regularly releasing new products.

As of 2023, the majority of Revell products are manufactured in Poland and China.

== In popular culture ==
In the movie Back to the Future, George McFly's past self in 1955 has a Revell 1/120 B-29 model.

== Controversies ==
In 2018, the German Revell company made headlines when it released a scale model kit of a Nazi UFO called "Haunebu II", with an accompanying description written as if the kit was depicting an actual historical craft, including claiming that it was the “world's first space travel-capable object” and that “airworthy examples” were first launched in 1943, although this object never actually existed, and speculations of Nazi Germany developing UFO technology are just far-right conspiracy theories. After historians had heavily criticized the historical inaccuracy, Revell issued an apology and removed the model from production and distribution.
