= Monogram (company) =

Toy model manufacturer

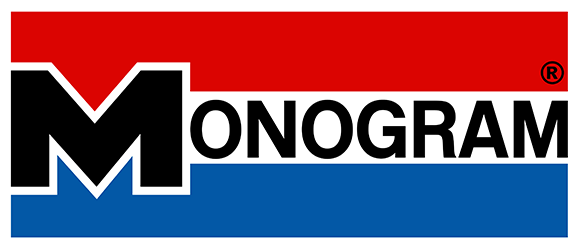
- Formerly: Revell-Monogram (1986–2007)
- Industry: Hobby
- Founded: 1945 in Chicago
- Defunct: 2007; 19 years ago
- Fate: Company defunct, "Monogram" brand logo disappeared from products since Hobbico acquired it
- Headquarters: Elk Grove, United States
- Products: Plastic model cars, aircraft, spacecraft, ships, military vehicles
- Parent: Odyssey Partners (1986–94); Hallmark Cards (1994–2007); Hobbico (2007–18)

- Monogram is an American brand and former manufacturing company of scale plastic models of cars, aircraft, spacecraft, ships, and military vehicles since the early 1950s. The company was formed by two former employees of Comet Kits, Jack Besser and Bob Reder.

Mattel acquired Monogram in 1968, and the firm passed through various owners and was merged with Revell, the combined company being bought by Hobbico in 2007. Along with Revell, AMT, and MPC, Monogram is sometimes called one of the traditional "Big 4" in plastic modeling.

== History ==
Monogram was founded in Chicago in 1945, making balsa wood model kits of ships and airplanes. Seaships such as the USS Missouri battleship, the USS Shangri-La carrier and the USS Hobby destroyer were among the first products. Meanwhile, a company called Revell started making plastic kits in 1953, and Monogram responded with "All Plastic" "Plastikits" the first of which were a red plastic midget racer and a "Hot Rod" Model A - and the modeling race was on. These two cars, and later an Indianapolis-style racer and hydroplane racing boat, were also offered with CO_{2} "Jet Power". Early kits advertised that the models were made from "acetate parts molded to shape". The wording showed the newness of the plastics industry and how plastics were not yet being taken for granted.

Early airplane models were mainly balsa wood, but more plastic parts were added over the next couple of years. By 1954 the airplane lineup consisted of the "Speedee Built" series which flew under rubber band power. A few of these planes were all-plastic. Also seen were the Superkits with a prefabricated balsa fuselage, but more plastic parts.

Auto kit makers AMT and Jo-Han started early but focused on manufacturers' promotional models and did not enter the kit fray until the late 1950s. As the 1950s progressed, Monogram increasingly included more automobile models and custom wheeled creations in competition with the other makers. Through the 1970s, competition required increased production of a variety of fantastical vehicles.

=== The Monogram approach ===
By the late 1950s, the company moved steadily into the car scene, especially with its hot rods and race cars. In 1956 it released a Model A V-8 rod and a Sprint Car, two of its first car kits. In 1959, Monogram issued its 1932 Ford Deuce 5 window coupe. One 1962 kit, however, showed the company's prowess and intent - the "Big T" (kit PC 78). This was a huge 1/8 scale 1924 Ford Model T bucket, complete with hot-rodded Chevy engine. The 24-page 8 1/2 x 11 inch instruction booklet showed that the model came with an optional electric motor to power the wheels, and featured customizing tips by Darryl Starbird, the famous Kansas customizer. The manual also shows how sophisticated the company's catering was toward hot rod culture - long before Hot Wheels or the Detroit muscle car craze.

=== Competition ===
As the 1960s progressed, Monogram and Revell squared off as rivals in the scale model market. While companies like AMT and MPC focused almost exclusively on cars, Monogram and Revell were more diversified, offering aircraft, naval craft and other military vehicles. Monogram aircraft kits were known for imaginative "operating features", such as a spring-loaded ejection seats on their F-105 Thunderchief model (operated by a tiny plastic tab on the side of the plane), and a tactical nuclear bomb which could be dropped from the RB-66A model - which also featured a moving tailgun turret.

In the 1970s, Monogram wanted to portray a different perspective of its kits and add some spark to sales. 'Make it large' was one marketing approach that the company returned to. For example, Monogram introduced a 1978 Corvette kit in 1:8 scale - when assembled it was over 23 inches long. Examples of vintage auto offerings were a 1930s Rolls-Royce Cabriolet with rumble seat, a 1930s Packard Phaeton, and a 1941 Lincoln Continental. The company's Early Iron series featured variants of Ford Model As. During the 1970s, the company also hired modeler Sheperd Paine to construct and paint aircraft models and dioramas, which were used for photographs on boxes and instruction booklets. Some metal kits, like a 1953 Corvette, also appeared.

=== Daniel hot rods and customs ===
While Revell carried many foreign cars and AMT and MPC handled the promo markets (and so moved forward with mostly American car brands), Monogram's emphasis was on aircraft and military vehicles. In the 1970s, however, Monogram started to focus more on hot rods and customs and, in 1961, was the first company to hire a well-known automobile stylist, when Darryl Starbird was brought on board. Similarly, AMT hired customizers George Barris, Alexander Brothers, and Bill Cushenbery, and MPC had Dean Jeffries. In 1968, Monogram then hired stylist Tom Daniel who designed more than 80 fantastical vehicles, not always based on real cars.

When the company was bought by Mattel in 1968, custom vehicles designed by Daniel and others were seen in both small and large sizes in Hot Wheels diecast - and then in Monogram kit form. Examples seen in both Hot Wheels and Monogram venues were the Ice-T, the Red Baron, the Paddy Wagon, the S'cool Bus, the Sand Crab, and the T'rantula (even made by Mattel subsidiary Mebetoys of Italy). Some of the handsomest vehicles were the simpler rods, like the "Son of Ford" '32 Ford rod and the "Boss 'A' Bone", a rodded '29 Model A pickup. Models of later vehicles were also common in this series, like the sleek "Street Fighter", a Daniel-designed '60 Chevy panel truck powered by a Camaro Z/28 engine (Quicksilver was another variation of the same kit), and the 1955 Chevrolet Bad Man gasser. By around 1970, many of these models were molded in bright reds and oranges and did not require painting.

Monogram offered a variety of more official race cars as well, again often leaving foreign vehicles to Revell which had established a Germany subsidiary. Monogram examples were Tom McEwen's Duster funny car, and its rival the Plymouth Barracuda driven by Don Prudhomme. Of course, both were offered by Mattel as Hot Wheels.

=== Many changes of hands ===
In 1984 Mattel divested itself of many companies not associated with its traditional toy industries. In 1986, Monogram was bought by Odyssey Partners, a New York private equity firm. Later that same summer, Odyssey purchased Revell Models of Venice, California. Subsequently, Odyssey Partners merged Revell with Monogram and moved all its usable assets to Monogram's Des Plaines, Illinois Plant Number 2. After Revell was merged with Monogram, company headquarters was moved a short distance to Northbrook, Illinois.

In the early 1990s, Revell-Monogram embarked on an experiment that tried to match historic modeling logos with a CD-Rom racing car game. After investing nearly $4 million, customers had trouble distinguishing model from game and the project was scrapped after only 50,000 were sold (Wallace 1994). Also in the early 1990s, Monogram sold their 1/87 Mini Exacts HO series to Herpa, where some of the models continue to be sold even today. One difference from the normal Herpa models was a metal chassis.

In 1994 Revell-Monogram was purchased by Hallmark Cards as part of its Binney and Smith division (the owners of famous Crayola crayons). This relationship lasted for thirteen years.

In May 2007, Hobbico Inc., the radio control airplane maker, announced the acquisition of Revell-Monogram LLC. From 1987 to 2005 the Monogram logo had appeared underneath that of Revell, but since the Hobbico acquisition, the Monogram name has disappeared. Now the Revell logo stands alone as Hobbico renamed the subsidiary the Revell Group, which consists of both revered names (the Revell-Monogram webpage has a graphic progression of the development of the two companies' logos going back to 1945). Concerning plastic kits, Hobbico also owns Estes, and is the exclusive distributor of Hasegawa, as seen on their company websites.

Hobbico declared bankruptcy on June 30, 2018, and went into liquidation.

== Product lines ==
Monogram was a prolific model producer. The following lists of kits are definitely not all-inclusive:

=== Aircraft ===
Japan 1/48 scale

- Mitsubishi A6M

Germany 1/48 scale

1. Arado Ar 234
2. Dornier Do 17
3. Dornier Do 217
4. Dornier Do 335
5. Focke-Wulf Ta 154 Moskito
6. Focke-Wulf Fw 190
7. Fokker D.VII
8. Heinkel He 111
9. Junkers Ju 87G Stuka
10. Junkers Ju 88
11. Junkers Ju 52
12. Messerschmitt Bf 109
13. Messerschmitt Bf 110
14. Messerschmitt Me 262
15. Messerschmitt Me 410 Hornisse

France 1/48 scale

- Dassault Mirage 2000

United States 1/48 or 1/72 scale

- Bell P-39 Airacobra
- Bell UH-1 Huey (Note: with several issues: A, B, C and F variants)
- Bell AH-1S Cobra
- Boeing AH-64 Apache
- Boeing B-17 Flying Fortress
- Boeing B-29 Superfortress
- Boeing B-52 Stratofortress
- Boeing P-12
- Boeing 2707
- Boeing 727
- Boeing 737
- Boeing 747
- Cessna A-37 Dragonfly
- Cessna 180 (Note: also issued as a floatplane)
- Convair F-102A Delta Dagger
- Convair F-106 Delta Dart
- Convair B-36 Peacemaker
- Convair B-58 Hustler
- Consolidated B-24 Liberator
- Consolidated PBY Catalina
- Curtiss F11C Goshawk
- Curtiss P-6 Hawk
- Curtiss P-36 Hawk
- Curtiss P-40 Warhawk
- Curtiss SB2C Helldiver
- Douglas DC-3
- Douglas C-47 Skytrain
- Douglas TBD Devastator
- Douglas SBD Dauntless
- Douglas A-26 Invader
- Douglas A-1 Skyraider
- Douglas A-4 Skyhawk (Note: also issued as OA-4M)
- Douglas B-66 Destroyer
- Fairchild Republic A-10 Thunderbolt II
- Ford Trimotor
- General Dynamics F-16 Fighting Falcon
- General Dynamics F-111 (Note: also released as EF-111A Raven)
- Grumman A-6 Intruder
- Grumman EA-6B Prowler
- Grumman F3F
- Grumman F4F Wildcat
- Grumman F6F Hellcat
- Grumman F7F Tigercat
- Grumman F9F Panther
- Grumman F-14 Tomcat
- Grumman HU-16 Albatross
- Grumman TBF Avenger
- Lockheed L-1049 Super Constellation
- Lockheed P-38 Lightning
- Lockheed P-80 Shooting Star
- Lockheed F-104 Starfighter
- Lockheed F-117 Nighthawk
- Lockheed SR-71 Blackbird
- LTV A-7 Corsair II
- Martin B-26 Marauder
- McDonnell F-101B Voodoo
- McDonnell-Douglas F-4 Phantom II
- McDonnell-Douglas AV-8B Harrier II
- McDonnell Douglas F-15 Eagle
- McDonnell-Douglas F/A-18 Hornet
- McDonnell Douglas DC-10
- North American AT-6 Texan
- North American A-5 Vigilante
- North American B-25 Mitchell
- North American P-51 Mustang
- North American F-82 Twin Mustang
- North American F-86 Sabre
- North American F-100 Super Sabre
- North American T-28 Trojan
- North American X-15
- Northrop P-61 Black Widow
- Northrop F-5E Tiger II
- Northrop F-20 Tigershark
- Northrop F-89 Scorpion
- Piper PA-20 Pacer
- Republic P-47 Thunderbolt
- Republic F-84F Thunderstreak
- Republic F-84 Thunderjet
- Republic F-105 Thunderchief
- Rockwell B-1 Lancer
- Space Shuttle
- Vought OS2U Kingfisher
- Vought F4U Corsair
- Vought F-8 Crusader
- Wright Flyer

United Kingdom 1/48 scale

- Royal Aircraft Factory S.E.5

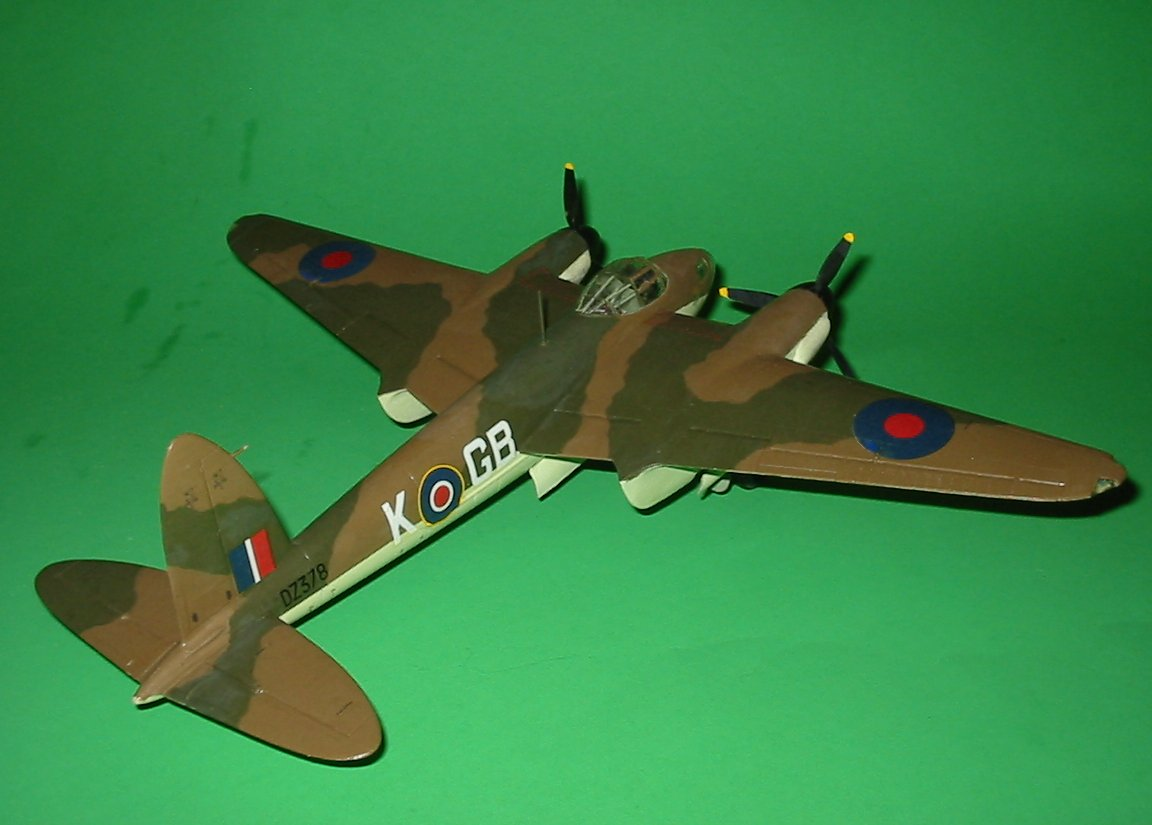
A built Monogram 1:48 scale British de Havilland Mosquito

- de Havilland Mosquito
- Hawker Hurricane
- Hawker Typhoon
- Sopwith Camel
- Supermarine Spitfire

Russia 1/48 scale

- Mikoyan-Gurevich MiG-15
- Mikoyan-Gurevich MiG-21
- Mikoyan-Gurevich MiG-25
- Mikoyan MiG-29
- Mil Mi-24

=== Cars ===
1/8 scale

- 1985 Corvette Coupe, kit #2608

1/24 scale classics

- 1934 Duesenberg SJ, 1939 Mercedes 540K, 1941 Lincoln Continental, Cord 812

1/24 scale contemporary

- 1957 Chevy Hardtop
- 1965 Chevy Impala SS 396
- 1982 Pontiac Firebird TransAm

1/87 scale Mini-Exacts

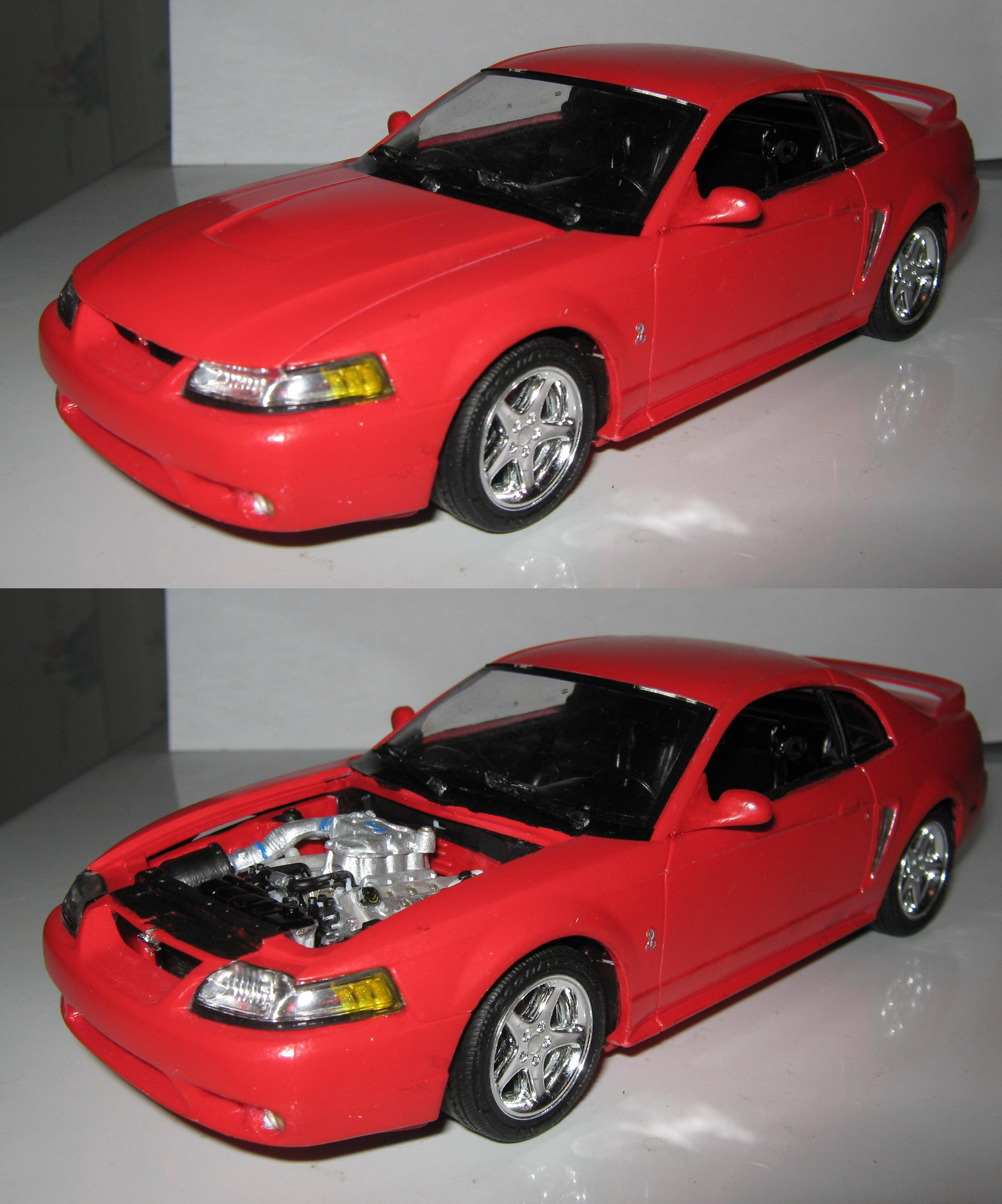
A built Monogram 1999 Ford Mustang Cobra in 1:25 scale

- Ferrari F40
- 1969 Ford Mustang Boss 302
- 1957 Chevrolet
- Ferrari Testarossa
- Lamborghini Countach
- Jaguar XK-E.
- 1989 Pontiac Grand Prix
- BMW 325 coupe
- Mercedes-Benz 300 SL Gullwing
- 1963 Corvette Split Window
- 1966 Shelby 427 Cobra
- 1962 Ferrari 250 GTO
- 1987 Z-28 Camaro
- 1990 Corvette ZR-1
- 1989 Ford Thunderbird SC
- Porsche 911 slant nose
- Mazda RX-7
- 1987 Buick Grand National, and
- Limited edition Indy Car and NASCAR Chevy Lumina.

=== Armor ===
1/32 scale

- M8 Greyhound Armored Car
- M20 Armored Car
- M3 Lee Medium Tank
- M3 Grant Medium Tank
- M4 Sherman Hedgehog
- Walker Bulldog
- M4A1 Sherman Screaming Mimi
- M48A2 Patton Tank
- Sd.Kfz. 232 Panzerspähwagen 8-Rad Armored Car
- Panzerkampfwagen IV Medium Tank
- Sturmgeschütz IV Assault Tank
- Panzerjäger IV L/70 Tank Destroyer
- Sturmpanzer IV Brumbär
- Flakpanzer IV Wirbelwind
- Flakpanzer IV Ostwind
- 2 1/2 ton truck
- US Jeep
- M3 personnel carrier 1/2 track
- M 16 Half Track
