= Horizon Hobby =

American radio control company

The Horizon Hobby logo

Horizon Hobby, LLC is an American multinational hobby-grade RC radio control (RC) model, model train manufacturer, and distributor. It was founded by Rick Stephens, Janet Ottmers, Debra Love, and Eric Meyers, in July 1985, and headquartered in Champaign, Illinois. Horizon Hobby products are sold in more than 50 countries. Additional facilities are in California and in the United Kingdom, Germany, and China.

== History ==
=== The early years – 1985–1999 ===
After Great Planes Model Distributors and Tower Hobbies merged in 1984, Hobbico, Inc. was created. In July 1985, Stephens, along with Janet Ottmers, Debra Love, and Eric Meyers, formed Horizon Hobby. October 1, 1985, was the first day of official business as the team started shipping inventory on orders they’d been taking the months prior. The company began distributing product lines such as Goldberg, Royal, K&B, Sullivan, and Du-Bro.

In 1986, a second distribution center was opened in Paso Robles, California, allowing Horizon Hobby to service retailers west of the Rockies. A year later, a third distribution center was opened in Ashland, Virginia, creating the ability to service retailers on the East Coast.

The first proprietary brand, Dynamite, was created in 1988.

Horizon Hobby purchased Hobby Dynamics in 1992 and secured exclusive distribution rights to brands such as JR radios and Saito engines, among others.

Horizon Hobby acquired Indy R/C in 1998 and remade it into the first iteration of horizonhobby.com. The early site featured the latest products, links to tech articles, a dealer locator, and more.

=== The revolutionary years – 2000–2017 ===
In 2000, Horizon Hobby introduced the HobbyZone Firebird, the world's first Teach-Yourself-to-Fly RC airplane. The Firebird featured a patented design and a user-friendly two-channel control system, making it accessible to new enthusiasts. This all-inclusive package included the airplane, battery, charger, and radio, allowing beginners to fly on the very same day.

Horizon Hobby merged with Team Losi, known for RC racing vehicles, in 2000. This collaboration led to the launch of the Losi Mini-T in 2003.

Another milestone came in 2004 with the introduction of the first 2.4 GHz spread spectrum radio systems for radio control models at the iHobby Expo in Rosemont, Illinois. Originally developed by Paul Beard, this technology is akin to what's used in cell phones and Wi-Fi routers. ¬

Horizon Hobby welcomed Athearn Trains in 2004, adding a line of model railroad products, including train sets, locomotives, cars, controllers, tracks, and accessories.

2005 witnessed the introduction of three proprietary brands: Spektrum radios and accessories, Blade helicopters, and ParkZone planes. These brands brought innovative RC technology to hobby-quality aircraft, featuring plug-and-play accessories and multiple flight modes.

Joe Ambrose assumed the role of CEO in 2008.

In 2009, Horizon Hobby created Airmeet, an annual event held at the airfield in Donauwörth, Bavaria. Airmeet blends RC displays and flying with full-size airplanes and flight shows.

2010 saw the introduction of Spektrum AirWare firmware, allowing for pilot programming and customization.

In 2011, Horizon Hobby unveiled the Blade CX2, the first coaxial mini helicopter with 2.4GHz control. The same year, Team Losi Racing introduced the 22 platform [12], winning numerous national and international titles and industry accolades.

In 2012, the Losi 5IVE-T 1/5 scale 4WD Off-Road Truck earned the title of Car Action Magazine Truck of the Year.

2013 brought the introduction of the E-flite Apprentice, heralded as the most intelligent RC airplane ever offered at the time. Continuing to serve RC beginners, Horizon Hobby launched the ECX Torment and Ruckus, the first monster truck and short course truck specifically designed for novice enthusiasts.

In 2014, Horizon Hobby underwent a significant change as it was acquired by a group of investors led by Joe Ambrose, forming Horizon Hobby, LLC.

The year 2015 brought the Blade Inductrix, the first ultra-micro First-Person View (FPV) quadcopter designed to be accessible to all skill levels. In the same year, Horizon Hobby introduced SAFE (Sensor Assisted Flight Envelope) Technology, enhancing the safety and ease of flying RC aircraft.

2016 marked the introduction of AVC (Active Vehicle Control) Technology, an advancement in RC vehicle stability and control.

Horizon Hobby continued in 2017 with the introduction of the iX12, the industry's first internet-capable radio transmitter.

Since its inception in 2017, Horizon RC Fest has grown to become the largest gathering of radio-controlled cars, trucks, airplanes, helicopters, and drones in the Midwest. The event is hosted at Eli Field in Monticello IL, typically over two days in early June.

=== The post-Hobbico years: 2018–present ===
In 2018, then-CEO Joe Ambrose led the efforts to purchase Hobbico.

Logic RC became the UK distributor of Horizon Hobby products in 2018.

After the death of Joe Ambrose in January 2019, Chris Dickerson was named President.

In 2020, Horizon Hobby announced the acquisition of Pro-Line Racing, in the RC performance and customization accessory market, and PROTOform, RC racing body manufacturer.

In 2021, Horizon Hobby announced the acquisition of AKA Products. In November of that same year, Horizon Hobby announced the acquisition of RC flight simulator software, RealFlight, from Knife Edge Software.

In 2023, Horizon Hobby announced the acquisition of Trinity Racing, a premier developer and manufacturer of RC racing accessories.

== Proprietary brands ==
Horizon Hobby consists of several brands:

- AKA
- ARRMA
- Athearn
- Axial
- Blade
- Duratrax
- Dynamite
- E-flite
- Evolution
- Hangar 9
- Hobby Essentials
- HobbyZone
- Losi
- McHenry Couplers
- Onyx
- O.S. Engines
- Pro Boat
- Pro-Line Racing
- PROTOform
- Roundhouse
- Saito
- Spektrum
- Team Losi Racing
- Top Flite
- Trinity Racing

== Events ==
Horizon Hobby hosts several radio control gatherings:

Airmeet Airmeet is an annual RC event held in Donauwörth, Bavaria.

RC Fest RC Fest is an annual RC event held at Eli Field in Monticello, Illinois.

AxialFest There are two Axialfest locations held each year – Axialfest itself in Pollock Pines, California, and Axialfest Badlands in Attica, Indiana.

Pro-Line by the Fire Held annually in Apple Valley, California, Pro-Line by the Fire is three days of RC events and family fun.
