= O.S. Engines =

Japanese manufacturer of model aircraft engines

O.S. Engines Mfg. Co., Ltd
- Type: Subsidiary
- Founded: December 10, 1941 in Higashisumiyoshi-ku, Osaka, Japan
- Founder: Shigeo Ogawa
- Headquarters: Higashisumiyoshi-ku, Osaka, Japan
- Key people: Seiichi Arata
- Total assets: 90,000,000 JPY (2012)
- Number of employees: 60 (2012)
- Parent: Futaba Corporation
- Website: www.os-engines.co.jp

O.S. Engines is a Japanese model engine manufacturer.

The company was founded in 1936 by machinist Shigeo Ogawa ("Ogawa Shigeo" in the Japanese surname-first tradition) for the production of model steam engines. The name of the firm could have either originated from the traditional Japanese family-name-first tradition being the source of the "OS" name, or from the firm's actual Japanese name, "Ogawa Seisakusho". At the suggestion of American buyer Paul Houghton, Ogawa tooled up for his first gasoline-powered engine, the 1.6 cc O.S. Type-1 of which 200 units were produced and exported under the brand name, "Pixie." After World War II, Ogawa Seisakusho expanded to produce the MAX line of engines, which won acclaim for their performance and durability.

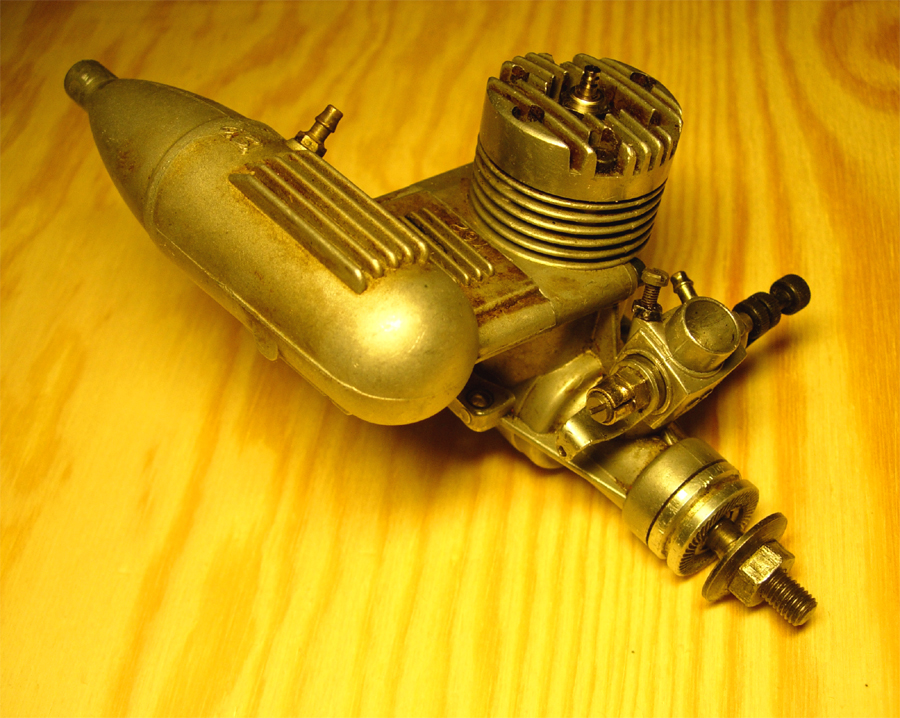
O.S. 25 FSR (1977), legendary part of O.S. history, shown with muffler

In 1976, OS pioneered the field of modern four-stroke glow plug ignition model engines with the "FS-60" 10 cm^{3} displacement exposed valve gear engine, and has been one of the top producers of four-stroke glow-plug-ignition model engines worldwide ever since.

O.S. Engines produces a much larger line of engines that included the only available Wankel rotary aircraft engine], which was first introduced in 1970, in cooperation with Graupner of Germany. Since Graupner's demise in 2012, O.S. continued to makes this 4.9 cm^{3} displacement engine on their own, still under license from NSU.

The 1980s brought increasing competition, which increased across the 1990s and into the 21st century. O.S. is now a leading manufacturer of single- and multi-cylinder model aircraft engines ranging from the small .10 LA two-stroke to the FF-320 four-stroke "giant-scale" flat four-cylinder and the FR7-420 Sirius7 7-Cylinder Radial Engine "giant-scale" radial.

O.S. engines in current production include the .21 TM, the .46 AX and many others. O.S. also makes required accessories for their engines including glow plugs, exhausts/mufflers and air filters.

O.S. has also extended their expertise to model cars, offering many reliable and powerful engines for these vehicles. Typical engines include OS 18 CV-R and OS 30VG. Four-strokes include FS26-C-S (0.26 ci displacement, meant to replace 0.12-0.15 two-strokes) and FS40-C-S (0.40 ci displacement, meant to replace 0.21-and-up two-strokes), with an updated FS26-C-S II currently out of production.

It is very easy to decode some facts from the engine name. In the above-mentioned four-stroke models, the C means car. This is to avoid confusing them with the aircraft engines they are based on. Additionally, an X in the name denotes a recoil start.

O.S. Engines' main competitor for both two- and four-stroke model engines is Yamada Engines (YS), also designed and produced in Japan, with the Saito Seisakusho firm being a stronger rival than the YS firm, in volume production of popular four-stroke model engines.

O.S. has also produced model steam locomotives, but has stopped production on 31st March, 2021.

== See also ==
- Model Engines
- Live Steam
