= Sanwa Electronic =

Japanese company

Coordinates: 34.67205°N 135.622603°E

Sanwa Denshi
- Native name: 三和電子機器株式会社
- Type: Kabushiki gaisha
- Traded as: Sanwa
- Founded: August 1959
- Headquarters: Higashiōsaka, Osaka Prefecture, Japan
- Key people: Seiji Suzuki
- Products: Radio-controlled transmitters; Remote control devices
- Revenue: 60 million yen
- Total assets: 3.1 billion yen (2013)
- Number of employees: 80
- Parent: SMC Group
- Subsidiaries: Airtronics
- Website: www.sanwa-denshi.co.jp www.airtronics.net

Sanwa Denshi (三和電子機器株式会社, Sanwa denshi kiki kabushiki kaisha), widely known as Sanwa, is a brand of wireless equipment best known for its high end radio-control gear for scale modelling use. The company have been a subsidiary of the SMC Group since 1965 and began to diversify into the manufacturing of radio-control equipment (transmitters and the devices which they control) in 1974 and remote control devices for home and industrial use since 1985.

In North America, Sanwa transmitters were marketed as Airtronics up until early 2016, which began as an independent company producing model airplanes.

== History ==
Sanwa, originally as part of Sansei Electric Industry, specialized in the research and development of remote control devices in 1959. It merged with Sanwa Denki Manufacturing in 1965 and then became part of the SMC Group. In January 1974, Sanwa entered production and sales of transmitters for radio-controlled models and in December, became a member of the Japan Radio Control Model Industrial Association (JRM).

In 1975, Sanwa became a division on its own, with an office in Tokyo. In August that year it launched its first radio-controlled transmitter, the Mini Propo, and in 1976, Sanwa became an independent company. Its M-sechs wheeled transmitter was the recipient of the Good Design Award in 1990. In 1985, Sanwa diversified into the production of remote controls for domestic and industrial purposes.

Due to its reputation in the radio-controlled modeling industry, its main competitor is Futaba. KO Propo and Spektrum.

== Airtronics ==
Airtronics logo (1970s-2016)

F. Lee Renaud began his hobby in model aviation in 1942 with a Joe Ott kit; he began to fly competitively in 1947. While recovering from a heart attack in 1970, Renaud used his medical leave from his office-equipment company job to build radio-controlled airplanes. He formed Airtronics in 1971 to build and sell model airplanes and radio remote-control devices. In his first year, he turned over $40,000. Renaud earned a reputation with model aircraft such as the "Olympic", "Aquila", "Grand Esprit" and "Sagitta", amongst others. In 1980, he introduced the XL transmitter. Renaud died in January 1983, and his wife Barbara took over the company.

In 1982, realizing that his company wouldn't expand on its own without financial backing, Renaud took on a partnership with Sanwa, which bought an undisclosed large stake in the company while the family retained a controlling interest. Under the agreement, the Renauds built airplanes whilst Sanwa took charge of manufacturing radio-controlled transmitters for the Renauds to distribute. As a result, Airtronics increased its sales from less than $1 million in 1983 to $3 million in 1985, and to $8 million in 1989 with a staff of 18 employees.

The company continued as a family business until 2007 when Global Hobby Distributors took over distributorship. Following business restructuring in Japan, the distributor announced that their partnership came to an end in 2016 and the brand will itself be discontinued although still continuing under a new distributor, Serpent America, as Sanwa.

The library of Academy of Model Aeronautics's National Model Aviation Museum is named after Renaud. Sanwa's Aquila 6 is named after his airplane.

== Accolades ==
The Airtronics Caliber 3PS (known internationally as the Sanwa M-zechs) became the first of twelve consecutive Radio Control Car Action's Readers' Choice Award for Best Transmitter in 1996 by Airtronics; eight of those was achieved by its successor, the M8.

== IFMAR World Championship winners ==
Following is a list of users who won the IFMAR World Championships, a biennial world championship for radio-controlled cars, using Sanwa/Airtronics transmitters.

Year	Class	Name	Model	Report
1985	1/10 Off-Road Stock	(United States) Jay Halsey	Airtronics XL2P	Report
1985	1/10 Off-Road Unlimited	(United States) Gil Losi, Jr.	Airtronics XL2P	Report
1987	1/8 IC Track	(United States) Pete Fusco	Airtronics	Report
1990	1/8 Off-Road	(Japan) Koji Sanada	Sanwa Machine-1	Report
1991	1/10 Off-Road 4WD	(United States) Cliff Lett	Airtronics CS2P	Report
1992	1/12 On-Road	(United States) Tony Neisinger	Airtronics Caliber 3P	Report
1992	PRO 10	(United States) Joel Johnson	Airtronics CS2P	Report
1992	1/8 Off-Road	(Japan) Kunihiro Toge	Sanwa M-zechs	Report
1993	1/10 Off-Road 2WD	(United States) Brian Kinwald	Airtronics CS2P	Report
1995	1/10 Off-Road 2WD	(United States) Matt Francis	Airtronics Caliber 3PS	Report
1995	1/10 Off-Road 4WD	(United States) Mark Pavidis	Airtronics CS2P	Report
1996	PRO 10	(United States) Mike Swauger	Airtronics Caliber 3PS	
1997	1/8 IC Track	(Italy) Lamberto Collari	Sanwa	
1997	1/10 Off-Road 2WD	(United States) Brian Kinwald	Airtronics Caliber 3PS	Report
1999	1/10 Off-Road 4WD	(Finland) Jukka Steenari	Sanwa M8	Report
2000	1/10 IC 235mm Touring Car	(Germany) Michael Salven		Report
2001	1/8 IC Track	(Japan) Kenji Osaka	Sanwa M8	
2002	1/10 Off-Road 2WD	(United States) Matt Francis	Airtronics M8	Report
2002	1/10 Off-Road 4WD	(Finland) Jukka Steenari	Sanwa M8	Report
2002	1/10 IC 235mm Touring Car	(United States) Brian Berry	Airtronics M8	Report
2003	1/8 IC Track	(Italy) Lamberto Collari	Sanwa	
2003	1/10 Off-Road 2WD	(United States) Billy Easton	Airtronics M8	Report
2004	1:10 ISTC	(Germany) Marc Rheinard	Sanwa M8	Report
2004	1/10 IC Touring Car	(France) Adrien Bertin		
2003	1/10 Off-Road 4WD	(United States) Ryan Cavalieri	Airtronics M11	Report
2005	1/10 Off-Road 4WD	(United States) Ryan Cavalieri	Airtronics M11	Report
2005	1/8 IC Track	(Italy) Lamberto Collari	Sanwa Super EXES	
2006	1/10 IC Touring Car	(Japan) Keisuke Fukuda		Report
2007	1/5 Touring Car	(Denmark) Martin Lissau	Sanwa M11	
2007	1/8 IC Track	(Italy) Lamberto Collari		
2008	1/10 IC Touring Car	(Italy) Daniele Ielasi		Report
2008	1:10 ISTC	(Germany) Marc Rheinard	Sanwa M11	Report
2009	1/8 IC Track	(Italy) Lamberto Collari	Sanwa EXZES Plus	
2009	1/10 Off-Road 2WD	(Germany) Martin Achter	Sanwa M11X	Report
2009	1/10 Off-Road 4WD	(Germany) Martin Achter	Sanwa M11X	Report
2010	1/12 On-Road	(Japan) Naoto Matsukura	Sanwa M11X	Report
2010	1:10 ISTC	(Germany) Marc Rheinard	Sanwa M11X	Report
2011	1/8 IC Track	(Germany) Robert Pietsch	Sanwa EXZES-X	
2011	1/10 Off-Road 2WD	(United States) Ryan Cavalieri	Airtronics M11X	Report
2011	1/10 Off-Road 4WD	(United States) Ryan Cavalieri	Airtronics M11X	Report
2012	1/12 On-Road	(Japan) Naoto Matsukura	Sanwa M12	Report
2012	1:10 ISTC	(Netherlands) Jilles Groskamp	Sanwa EXZES-X	Report
2012	1/10 IC Touring Car	(Thailand) Meen Vejrak	Sanwa M12	Report
2013	1/8 IC Track	(Japan) Tadahiko Sahashi	Sanwa M12	
2014	1/8 Off-Road	(Canada) Ty Tessmann	Airtronics M12	Report
2014	1/12 On-Road	(Germany) Marc Rheinard	Sanwa M12	Report
2014	1:10 ISTC	(Japan) Naoto Matsukura	Sanwa M12	Report
2014	1/10 IC Touring Car	(Sweden) Alexander Hagberg	Sanwa M12	Report
2015	1/10 Off-Road 2WD	(United States) Spencer Rivkin	Airtronics M12S	Report
2015	1/10 Off-Road 4WD	(Portugal) Bruno Coelho	Sanwa M12S	Report
2016	1/10 IC Touring Car	(Germany) Dominic Greiner	Sanwa M12	
2016	1/12 On-Road	(Japan) Naoto Matsukura	Sanwa M12S	
2016	1:10 ISTC	(Germany) Ronald Völker	Sanwa M12S	
2016	1/8 Off-Road	(Sweden) David Ronnefalk	Sanwa M12S	
2017	1/8 IC Track	(Italy) Dario Balestri	Sanwa EXZES-ZZ	
2017	1/10 Off-Road 2WD	(United States) Ryan Maifield	Sanwa M12S	Report
2017	1/10 Off-Road 4WD	(United States) Ryan Maifield	Sanwa M12S	Report
2017	1/5 Touring Car	(Argentina) Santiago Meirinhos	Sanwa M12	
2018	1/12 On-Road	(Sweden) Alexander Hagberg	Sanwa M12S	
2018	1:10 ISTC	(Portugal) Bruno Coelho	Sanwa M12S	
2018	1/10 IC Touring Car	(Japan) Naoto Matsukura	Sanwa M12S	
2018	1/8 Off-Road	(Italy) Davide Ongaro	Sanwa EXZES-ZZ	
2019	1/10 Off-Road 4WD	(Portugal) Bruno Coelho	Sanwa M17	Report
2019	1/8 IC Track	(Japan) Shoki Takahata	Sanwa M17	
2020	1/12 On-Road Stock	(United Kingdom) Andy Murray	Sanwa EXZES-ZZ	
2020	1/12 On-Road	(Germany) Marc Rheinard	Sanwa M12S	Report
2020	1/8 IC GT	(Germany) Jörn Neumann	Sanwa M17	
2022	1/8 Off-Road	(Italy) Davide Ongaro	Sanwa EXZES-ZZ	
2022	1:10 ISTC	(Portugal) Bruno Coelho	Sanwa M17	
2022	1/10 IC Touring Car	(Japan) Tadahiko Sahashi	Sanwa M17	
2023	1/10 Off-Road 2WD	(Italy) Davide Ongaro	Sanwa EXZES-ZZ	
2023	1/10 Off-Road 4WD	(United States) Tater Sontag	Sanwa M12S	
2023	1/8 IC Track	(Italy) Dario Balestri	Sanwa EXZES-ZZ	
