= Spektrum RC =

Radio control systems brand

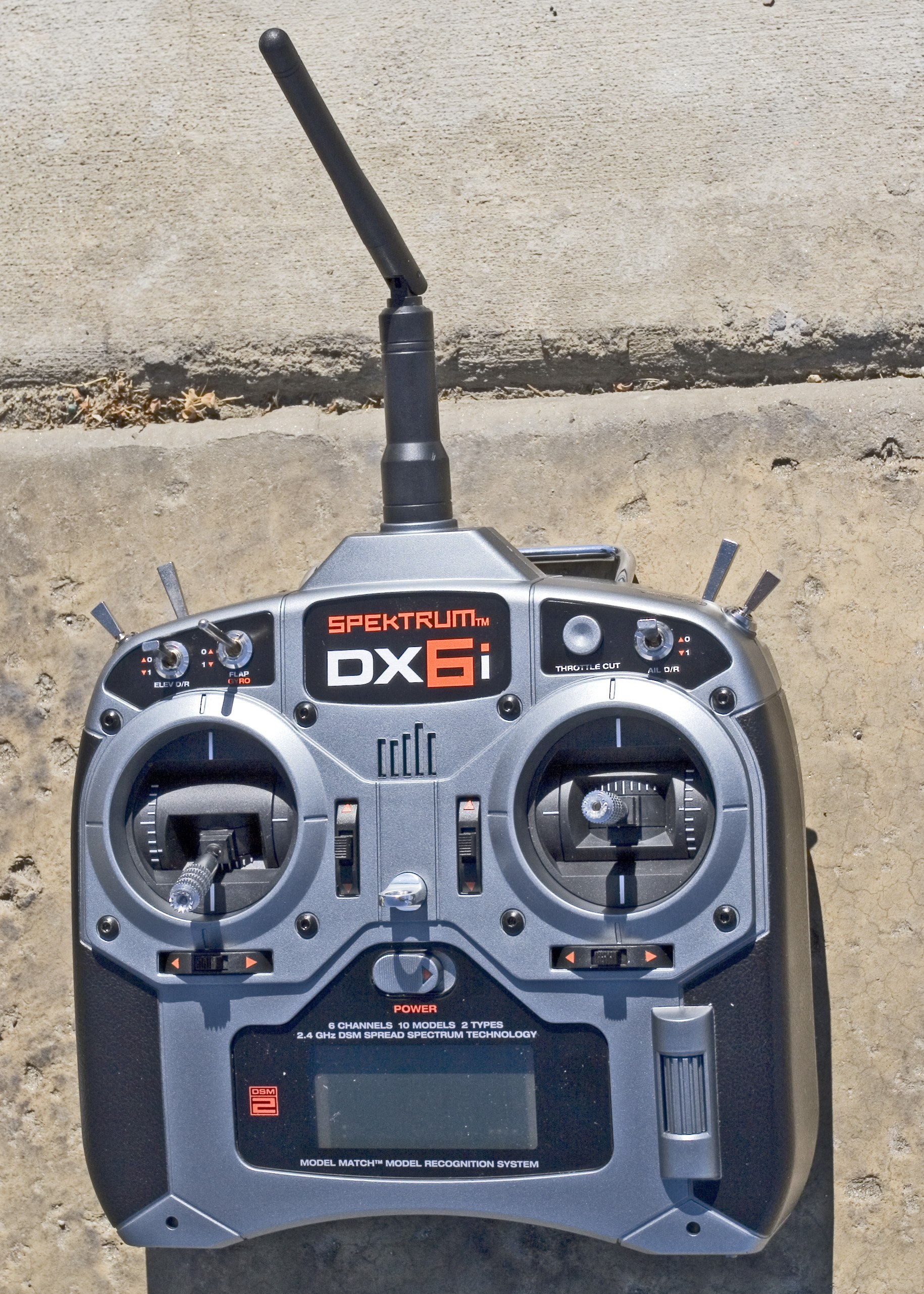
Spektrum DX6i six-channel spread spectrum computerized aircraft radio which may be used for both helicopters and fixed-wing models

Spektrum is a brand of radio control systems designed for use with hobby radio-controlled cars and aircraft. Spektrum is a division of Horizon Hobby.

The R/C hobby in the United States, Japan, and Europe typically used to employ FM radio control in HF and VHF bands such as 27 MHz, 35 MHz, 49 MHz, and 72 MHz. Most manufacturers of radio gear (all non-toy manufacturers) now use the 2.4 GHz band for their transmitters and receivers. Spektrum systems are distinguished in that they use direct-sequence spread spectrum (DSSS) technology on the 2.4 GHz ISM band. Spektrum refers to their technology as "Digital Spectrum Modulation." Each transmitter has a globally unique identifier (GUID), to which receivers can be bound, ensuring that no transmitter will interfere with other nearby Spektrum DSMx systems. The Spektrum system is also one of the manufacturers which offers "Model Match" in which the receiver in a particular model can be bound to one and only one transmitter model definition. This prevents a user from flying their RC helicopter while the transmitter is still programmed for their RC airplane.

Spektrum is the original application of 2.4 GHz spread spectrum radio systems to radio control models. It was originally developed by Paul Beard.

Spektrum broke the run of twelve consecutive Readers' Choice Award by Radio Control Car Action for Best Transmitter achieved by one of its rivals, Airtronics with the DX4R in 2008 and has maintained its consecutive run since. Bind-N-Fly is a model that is ready to fly or drive once bound to an existing compatible transmitter. Spektrum was instrumental in bringing this term and concept into mainstream RC model vocabulary.
