= Futaba Corporation =

Manufacturer of radio control devices

- Native name: 双葉電子工業株式会社
- Company type: Public KK
- Traded as: TYO: 6986
- Industry: Electronics
- Founded: Mobara, Japan (February 3, 1948; 78 years ago)
- Headquarters: Mobara, Chiba Prefecture 297- 8588, Japan
- Key people: Hiroshi Sakurada (President)
- Products: OLED displays; Vacuum fluorescent displays; Display modules; Capacitive Touch panels; Radio control equipment; Automation equipment; Components for press die sets and mold bases
- Revenue: ▲JPY 67,083 billion (FY 2019) (US$ 613.5 million) (FY 2019)
- Net income: ▲JPY 1.79 billion (FY 2013) (US$ 17.45 million) (FY 2013)
- Number of employees: 5,007 (consolidated, as of March 31, 2019)
- Website: Official website

Futaba Corporation (双葉電子工業株式会社, Futaba Denshi Kōgyō Kabushiki-gaisha) is a Japanese company founded in 1948, originally to produce vacuum tubes. As time passed, production and elemental techniques of the vacuum tube transformed into the manufacturing of vacuum fluorescent displays (VFDs), tool and die set components, radio control equipment and OLED displays.

== Company profile ==
Futaba Corporation is divided into three business units — Electronic Components, Electronic Systems Division, and Machinery and Tooling Division.

- Electronics Component Division — VFD and OLED displays and capacitive touch panels
- Machinery and Tooling — Press and mold equipment and related components
- Electronic Systems Division — Radio control (RC) for both hobby and industrial applications and servomotors.

=== Remote control ===
Futaba became one of the first companies of its type to provide comprehensive radio control products, selection and service to hobbyists. Futaba systems and products were quickly accepted and used by serious competitors and casual enthusiasts alike. Futaba products are used in the air, on the water, underwater and on the ground for all types of radio-controlled models. Futaba manufactures all components in-house, including tools and manufacturing facilities.

The hobby brand is distributed in North America by FutabaUSA, by Ripmax in the UK, Ireland, Germany and Austria, along with other distributors around the world.

== Gallery ==
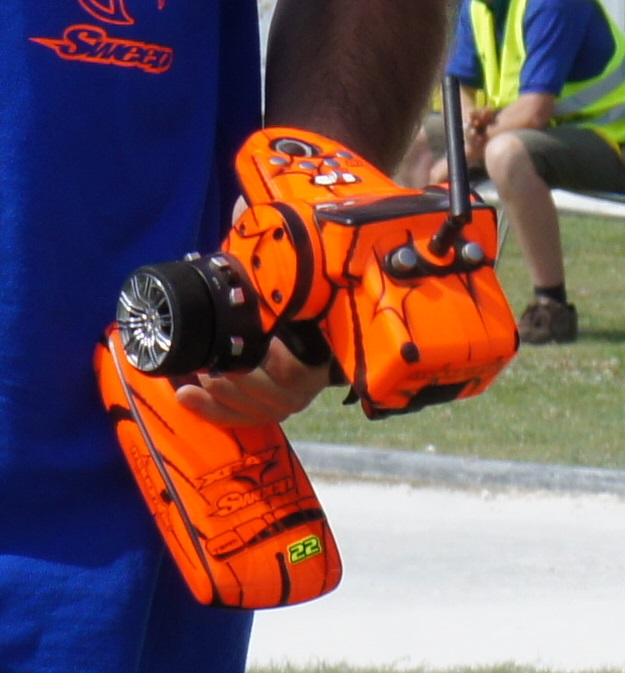
Futaba transmitter for RC cars

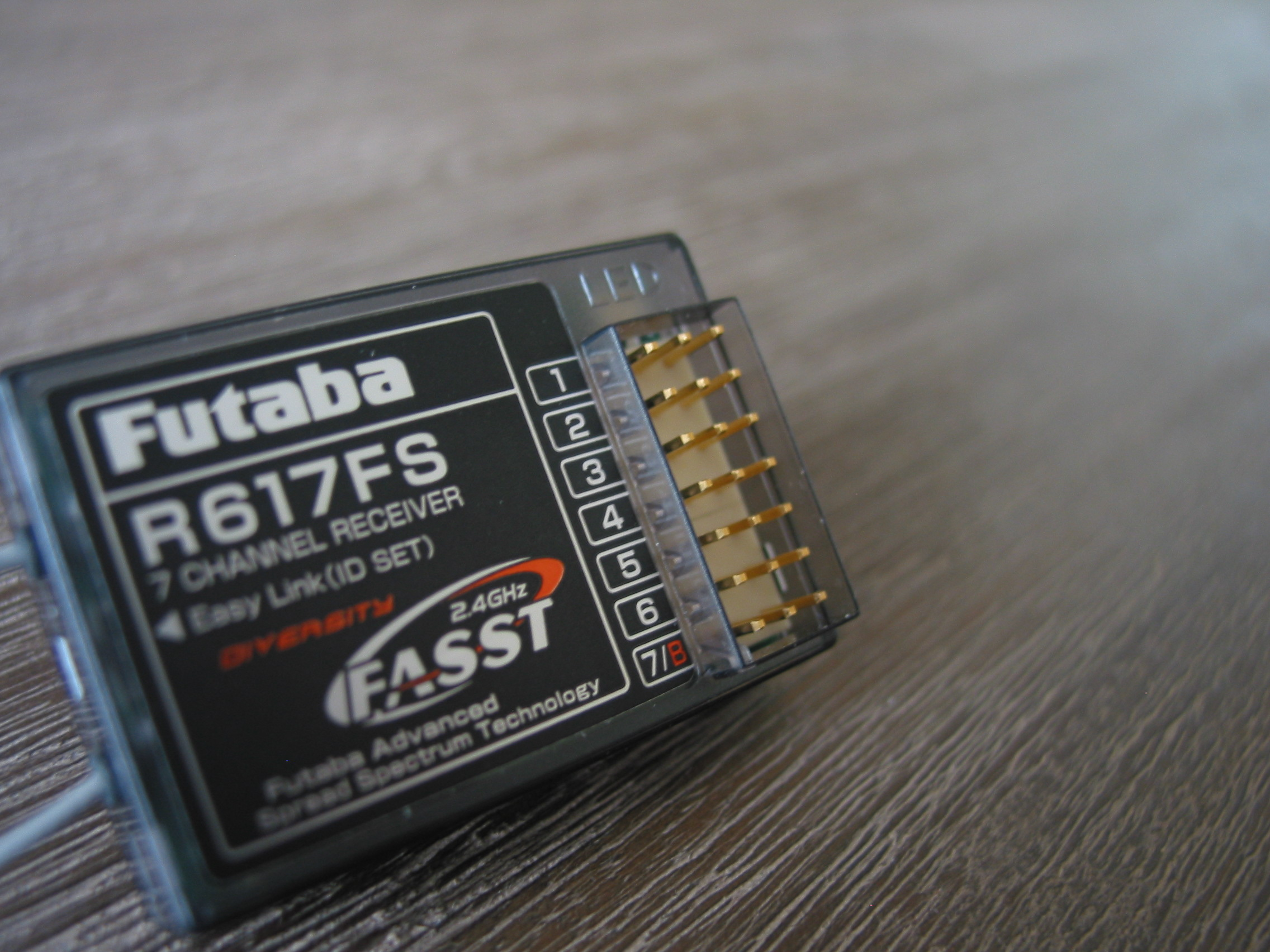
A Futaba 2.4GHz 7-channel receiver

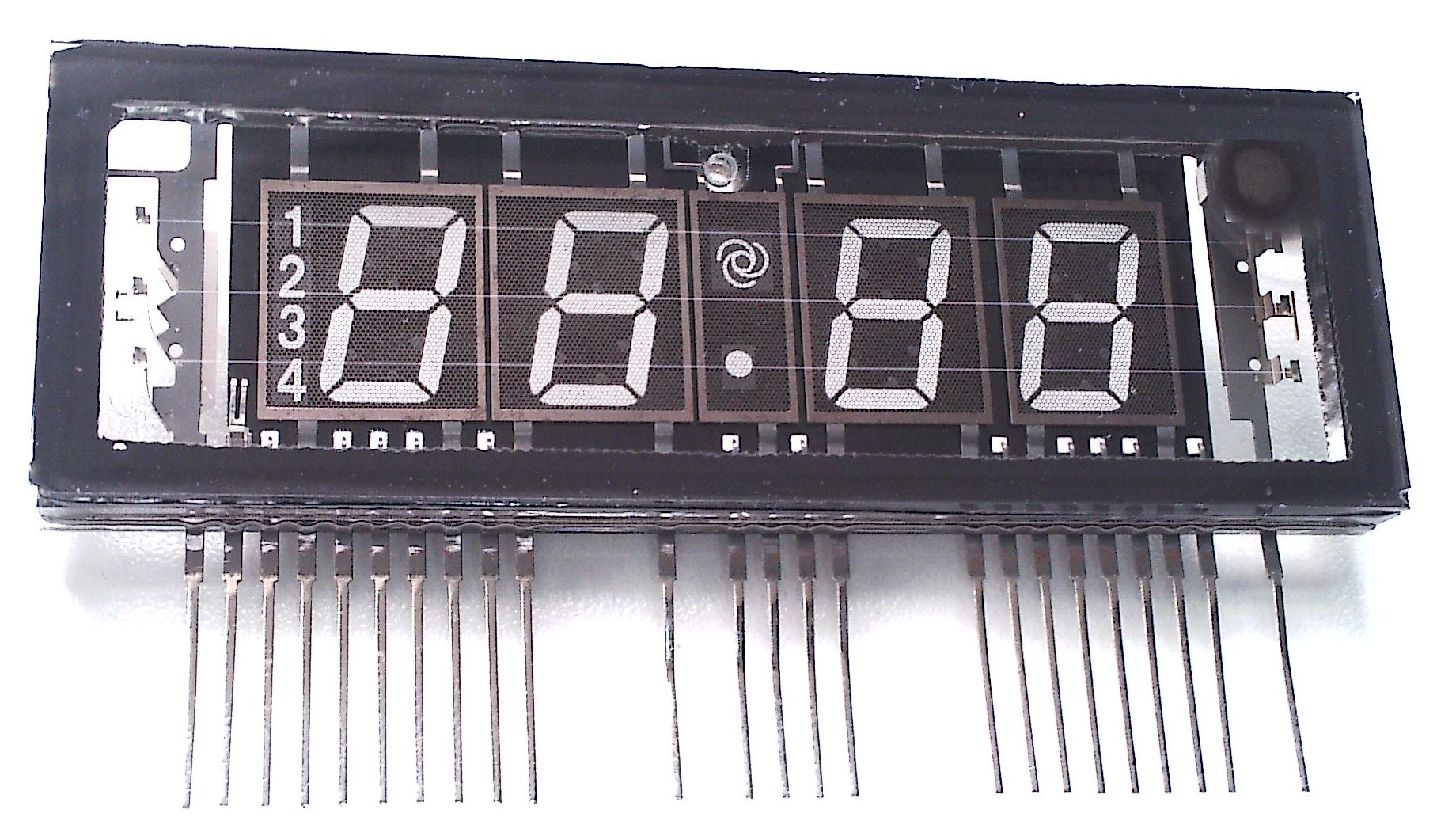
Seven-segment vacuum fluorescent display FUTABA 4-LT-46ZB3

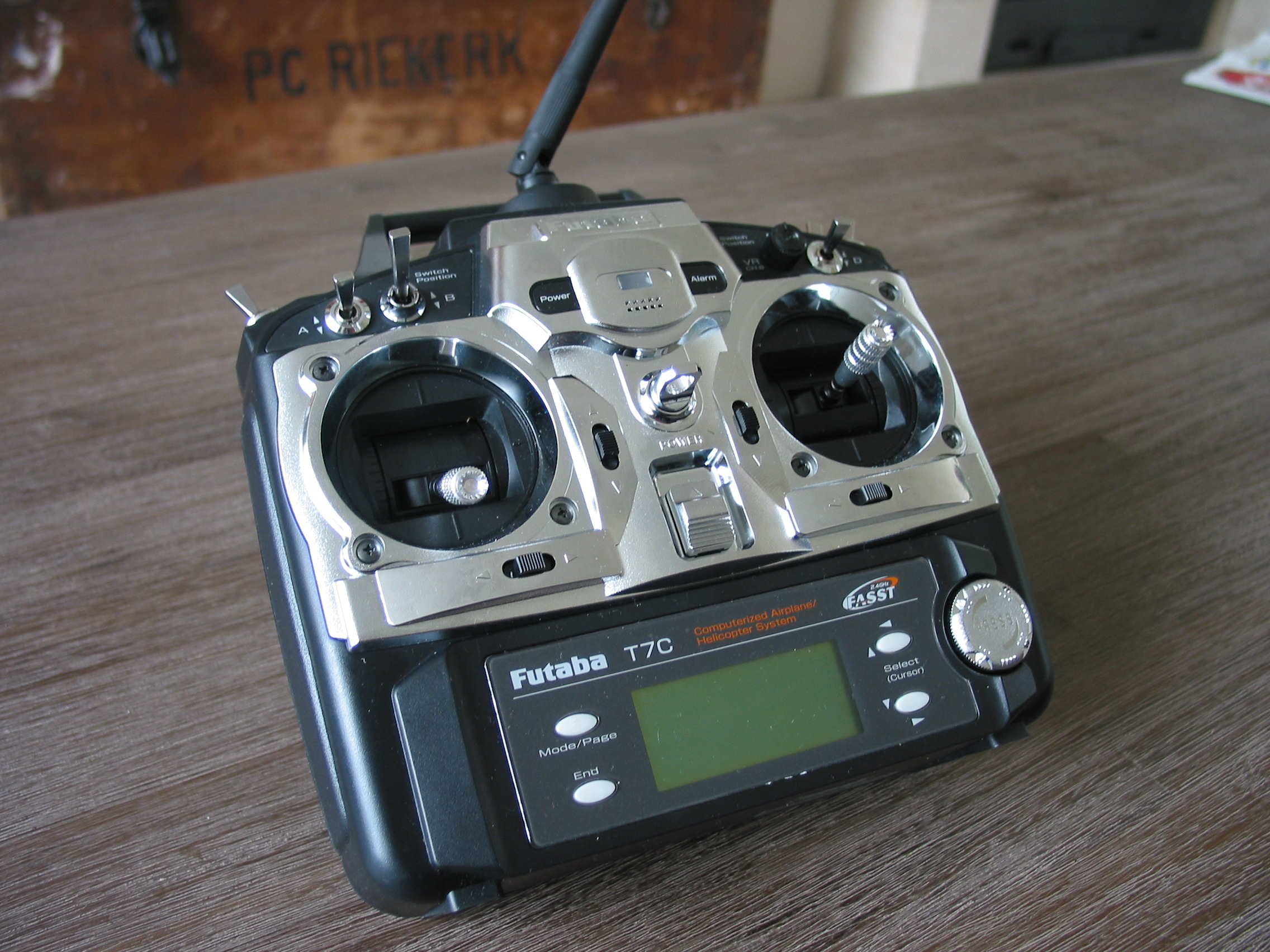
Futaba transmitter for model aircraft
